= Lin Tainan =

Japanese criminal (1957–2018)

- Born: December 15, 1957; Kodaira or Shibuya, Tokyo, Japan
- Died: July 26, 2018 (aged 60); Sendai, Miyagi Prefecture, Japan
- Education: Kogakuin University
- Occupation: Shinrikyo
- Known for: Matsumoto sarin attack Tokyo subway sarin attack
- Status: Executed
- Penalty: Death penalty

Lin Tainan (Japanese: Lin Tainan/はやしやすお Hayashi Yasuo; December 15, 1957 – July 26, 2018) was a Japanese convicted murderer, terrorist and former member of the doomsday cult Aum Shinrikyo. He is of Korean descent, and changed his name to Koike Yasuo after taking his wife's surname. He was a former senior cadre of Aum Shinrikyo (Master Zhengwu, deputy minister of the Ministry of Science and Technology).

== Education ==
Lin Tainan graduated from Kogakuin University having previously attended a vocational school. After graduation, Lin Tainan spent three years traveling around the world. In 1987, Lin Tainan joined "Aum Shinkai", the predecessor of Aum Shinrikyo. In 1988, he became a monk at Aum Shinrikyo. Lin Tainan participated in a series of crimes, such as the Matsumoto sarin attack led by Aum Shinrikyo and the Tokyo subway sarin attack. Lin Tainan was arrested on December 3, 1996, in Okinawa Prefecture, after one year and nine months on the run. The media called Lin Tainan a "killing machine".

On July 26, 2018, Tainan Lin was hanged at the Miyagi Prefecture Criminal Office in Sendai City, Miyagi Prefecture; the same day as Kenichi Hirose, Kazaki Okazaki, Masato Yokoyama, Satoru Hatamoto, and Hiroshi Toyodaw.

Lin Tainan has the same surname as Ikuo Hayashi, another Aum Shinrikyo-related criminal, but they are unrelated.

== Early years ==
On December 15, 1957, Lin Tainan was born in Shibuya District, Tokyo (or Kodaira, Tokyo; there are different opinions). He was the second son in his family. Tae-man's family had immigrated to Japan from the Korean Peninsula. Lin Tainan's grandfather immigrated to Japan from the Korean Peninsula before World War II and worked in the local military association. Lin Tainan's grandmother was a key surveillance target of the Japanese Public Security Investigation Agency because she was suspected of helping North Korea's secret workshop. Lin Tainan's father was an employee of the Japan National Railways. In 1959, when Lin Tainan was two years old, he was naturalized. When Lin Tainan was about to enter high school, he learned from the household registration transcript that his father was originally a Korean. Due to Japanese society at that time, naturalized Koreans and prejudice against American immigrants made Lin Tainan feel uncomfortable.

In 1974, he dropped out of the strict Kugayama High School of Kogakuin University. He entered Tokyo Metropolitan Tachikawa High School for part-time study, during which he obtained an electrical engineer qualification certificate. After graduation, Lin Tainan was admitted to the Department of Electrical Engineering at the kogakuin University. During college, Lin Tainan had top grades and researched artificial intelligence. However, at the age of 20, Lin Tainan's father died. His father's death prompted him to consider spiritual matters.

== Similar to Aum Shinrikyo ==
After graduating from vocational school in 1983, Lin Tainan chose to wait to find a job. He spent three years traveling around the world. During this period, Lin Tainan experienced Indigenous North American culture and was disgusted with the local racism. He also smoked cannabis while traveling in Mexico. It is also reported that he had a favorable impression of India. During this three-year trip, Lin Tainan frequently contacted his mother because he was worried about her, as she lived alone.

Shortly after returning to Japan from the trip, Lin Tainan began to feel unwell. He went to the hospital for examination but could not find the cause. At the same time, he and his girlfriend broke up. All this made Lin Tainan mentally unstable. During this period, Lin Tainan, who was in a depressed mood, began to read the books of Asahara Shoko, the leader of Aum Shinrikyo (then called "Aum Shinkai") and gradually got closer to Shoko Asahara's predecessor, Aum Shinkai. In 1987, Lin Tainan joined the Aum Fairy Society. In 1988, Lin Tainan quit his job and became a monk in the religious order, reorganized into Aum Shinrikyo.

== Crime ==
After joining Aum Shinrikyo, Lin Tainan served as the driver for Asahara Shoko and other sect cadres. He was also responsible for recording Asahara's lectures and editing them into videotapes. Later, Asahara appointed him as the "Secretary-General of the Ministry of Science and Technology" within the Order. Because Lin Tainan was familiar with electrical work, after taking office, he was made responsible for the electrical facilities within the Order, but was also in charge of eavesdropping on Soka Gakkai believers, those related to the Russian government, and the monitoring of arrested fleeing believers. Lin Tainan is closely related to Aum Shinrikyo's weaponization policy. Asahara also sent Lin Tainan to Russia to receive shooting training. While staying in Jiuyise Village, the stronghold of Aum Shinrikyo, Lin Tainan also developed a relationship with a female Aum Shinrikyo believer.

Before Shoko Asahara decided to carry out the Tokyo subway sarin attack in 1995, Lin Tainan was selected as one of the poisoners. Even though Lin Tainan already wanted to quit the cult, Asahara Shoko threatened his life and his family, so Lin Tainan had to participate in the action.

On the eve of the incident, the ten bags of sarin prepared by the chemistry team were running low. Lin Tainan volunteered to take the extra bag and received three bags. The other four attackers each held two bags. Yoshihiro Inoue once said: "Among the five people who poisoned the subway, Lin Tainan was the most gentle." On the day of the crime, Lin Tainan took the Hibiya Line subway train from Ueno Station. Before puncturing the sarin gas bag, he became suspicious of the mission. Finally, he punctured the sarin gas bag and threw it in the carriage before getting off the train. The sarin gas dropped by Lin Tainan eventually killed eight people and injured thousands more. He was the one who caused the most severe casualties among the five attackers in the Tokyo subway sarin gas incident.

In addition, Lin Tainan is also suspected of manufacturing a sarin gas spraying truck for the 1994 Matsumoto sarin attack. In May 1995, he planned to drop cyanide gas into the men's restroom of Shinjuku Station to disrupt the police investigation into Aum Shinrikyo leader Shoko Asahara. However, the attack ultimately failed.

== Arrest, trial, and death penalty ==
On December 3, 1996, after one year and nine months on the run, the police arrested Lin Tainan on Ishigaki Island, Okinawa Prefecture. When Lin Tainan was tried, he argued that he was forced to commit the crime under the death threat of Asahara Shoko and said, "I believe in reincarnation and the Lord of Hell, so I will not lie." However, he also apologized to the victim during the trial. In 2000, the Tokyo District Court sentenced Lin Tainan to capital punishment. In 2008, the death penalty was established.

In the book "1Q84" written by the famous Japanese writer Haruki Murakami, Lin Tainan's state when he released poison gas in the Tokyo subway during the trial was written.

As of March 2018, Lin Tainan and twelve other death row inmates related to Aum Shinrikyo had been detained in the Tokyo detention house. On March 21, 2018, these death row inmates were dispersed to five facilities, including the Tokyo detention house that can carry out executions. Among them, Lin Tainan was sent to the Miyagi Criminal Office in Sendai City, Miyagi Prefecture. On July 26, 2018, with the approval of the Minister of Justice Yoko Kamikawa, a total of six persons, including Toru Toyoda, Kazaki Okazaki, Masato Yokoyama, Satoru Hamotomoto, and Ken Hirose, were arrested at the Miyagi Prison. He was executed by hanging.
