= Kazuaki Okazaki =

Aum Shinrikyo member and murderer

- 岡崎一明
- Undated police mugshot
- Born: October 8, 1960; Mine, Yamaguchi, Japan
- Died: July 26, 2018 (aged 57); Nagoya Detention House, Higashi-ku, Nagoya, Japan
- Cause of death: Execution by hanging
- Known for: Sakamoto family murder and other crimes related to membership of Aum Shinrikyo
- Status: Executed
- Convictions: Mass murder Terrorism
- Penalty: Death

Kazuaki Okazaki (岡崎一明, Okazaki Kazuaki; October 8, 1960 – July 26, 2018) was a Japanese convicted multiple murderer and former member of the doomsday cult Aum Shinrikyo who co-perpetrated the Sakamoto family murder and another murder in 1989. Immediately after the Sakamoto murders, he abandoned the cult and turned himself in to the police after the Tokyo subway sarin attack in 1995. He was tried and was sentenced to death for those crimes, for which he pleaded clemency. The petition was repeatedly dismissed by the courts and he was executed in July 2018.

== Biography ==
Okazaki was born in Mine, Yamaguchi as a premature baby in 1960. In January 1963, his parents divorced. He was eventually renamed after the divorce. Okazaki was reportedly also physically abused as a child by his adoptive father in several occasions. As a junior high school student he began attending Sunday school and studying the Bible after meeting a German Protestant Christian. He graduated from school in 1979 and his wishes were to enroll at the Yamaguchi University but his fees to entrance into the university were refused and he later moved to Matsue, Shimane Prefecture.

=== Joining Aum Shinrikyo ===
Okazaki met Aum Shinrikyo leader Shoko Asahara in December 1985 when Asahara held a conference in Kanagawa Prefecture and was reportedly overwhelmed by Asahara's "great inclusiveness, practicing energy, and humble attitude", prompting him to join the cult. By 1986, Asahara was aggressively trying to acquire followers to expand his cult, and asked Okazaki, who was a salesman, to sell books that promote the organization. Okazaki did great in sales and became an active salesman of the published works by Asahara, to whom he showed greater admiration by the time.

On September 22, 1988, during a cult's event, a follower suddenly died during a training exercise. Asahara, who by then was planning to submit to the Governor of Tokyo for a cult certification and was looking to further expand the organization, asked Okazaki to conceal the death of this member to the public, to which Okazaki agreed. The next morning, after Asahara's instruction of incinerating this person's body, Okazaki and others built fireproof bricks and placed the body there. The remains were later scattered in Lake Shōji, in Yamanashi Prefecture.

=== Murders ===
In December 1988, a 21-year-old follower told Asahara that he would leave the cult because he could not put up with the training. In January 1989, this young man told Okazaki about his plans to leave, and Okazaki tried to stop him. As a result, Asahara ordered him a harder training locked in confinement in a vacant lot. He was later murdered in November 1989 by Okazaki and other members of the cult.

On the morning of November 4, 1989, Okazaki, along with a group of other cult members, entered the Sakamoto family apartment through an unlocked door at 3 A.M. There, Okazaki co-murdered the family, striking Tsutsumi Sakamoto in the head with a hammer, beating his wife Satoko Sakamoto to death and injecting their infant son Tatsuhiko Sakamoto, 14 months old, with potassium chloride, later covering his face with a cloth. Their remains would not be found until after the perpetrators' confessions in 1995.

=== Escape from Aum Shinrikyo ===
In February 1990, Okazaki took photos of the sites where the Sakamotos were allegedly buried and sent them to Asahara, blackmailing him of sending the photos to the police if he did not give him money for living expenses, to which Asahara initially refused, prompting Okazaki to send maps and other photographs to the Kanagawa Prefectural Police and Sakamotos' lawyer's office. Several days later, Okazaki sent similar letters indicating the whereabouts of the corpses of Sakamoto and his wife to the police and the lawyers' office. This time, Asahara agreed to give him money to keep him silent. Okazaki was given about 8.3 million yen, and tried to stop a second wave of letters that he had sent to prefectural police. However, police managed to track him down and he was questioned for the first letters that he had sent before, giving details and maps of the whereabouts of the Sakamoto family's bodies. In the interrogation in 1990, Okazaki denied involvement in the crime and denied that Aum Shinrikyo was involved.

=== Capture and trials ===
Immediately after the Tokyo subway sarin attack, Okazaki turned himself in to the police out of fears of assassination by cult members and confessed to his crimes.

During a trial in July 1998, the prosecution demanded the death penalty for all the cultists. Okazaki asked for clemency due to the fact that he had confessed to the crimes and given himself up to police, aside of providing incriminatory evidence against the cult, however, the court rejected this saying that Okazaki had done so in order to protect himself and avoid harm to himself. In the second trial in December 2001, he faced a similar argument by the court, when he was told that his belief in Asahara "did not destroy his personality itself" and that the "transformation of his values was caused by his own desire". The judge also rejected that he was a "weak person" and sentenced him to death again pointing that he was "far from reducing the defendant's responsibility and evacuation." The Tokyo High Court later rejected a similar appeal and upheld his death sentence.

On April 7, 2005, the Supreme Court finalized his death sentence on the basis that his crimes were "cruel and brutal [...] committed only to maintain the organization of the cult", and added that Okazaki held great responsibility for the crimes even after surrendering himself. The court, as well as the previous courts, highlighted that Okazaki had turned himself in to the police to "protect himself" from the cultists.

=== Execution ===
Although Okazaki appealed several times to the fact that he had confessed and turned himself to the police to overturn his sentence, it was never accepted and under the order of justice minister Yoko Kamikawa, the first wave of executions of cultists were carried out on July 6, 2018.

He was executed days later, after his death warrant was issued by Kamikawa, who said that "the majority of the public believe that there is no other option than to execute those who have committed brutal crimes."

== Comparison of case with Ikuo Hayashi ==
During the trials, Okazaki pointed out that one of the perpetrators of the Tokyo subway attack, Ikuo Hayashi, had received life imprisonment instead of the death penalty in exchange for his testimony. However, the courts found differences between both:

- 1) Okazaki was self-confident of avoiding the death penalty and confessed out of self-protection rather than self-reflection.
- 2) In 1990, Okazaki did not contribute to the investigators of the Sakamoto murders, who, at the time, did not suspect the cult was behind the attack.
- 3) Okazaki thought that it was stronger for him to assist Asahara in his missions than to be excommunicated with main motivation defend the religious organization and strengthen his training.

== See also ==
- Capital punishment in Japan
- List of executions in Japan
