= Tokyo subway sarin attack =

1995 terrorist attack by Aum Shinrikyo

Coordinates: 35°41′22″N 139°41′30″E

Tokyo subway sarin attack 地下鉄サリン事件
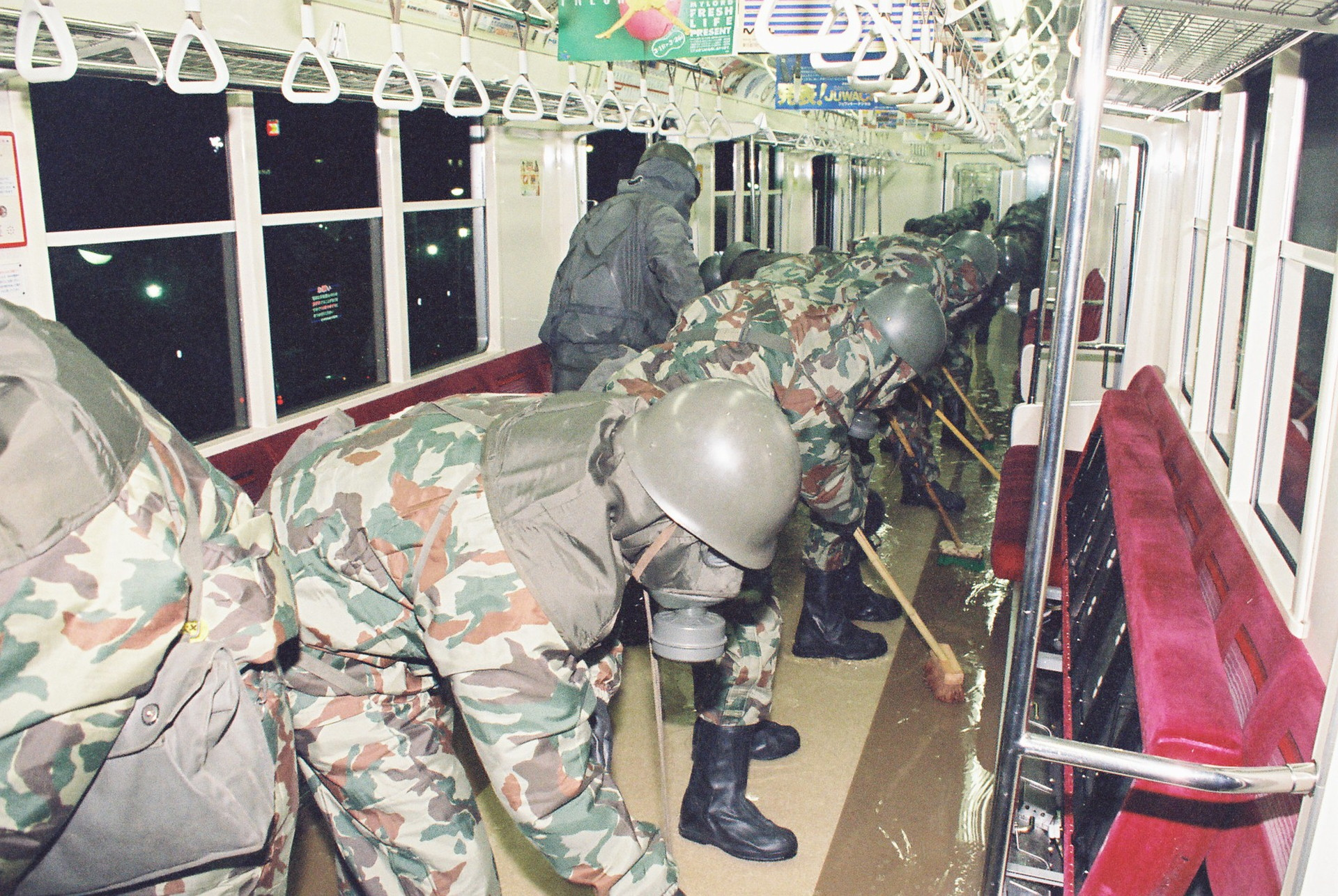
- Japan Ground Self-Defense Force personnel decontaminating subway cars contaminated with sarin.
- Location: Tokyo, Japan
- Date: 20 March 1995; 7:00 a.m. (JST)
- Target: Tokyo subway
- Attack type: Chemical terrorism; Religious terrorism
- Weapon: Sarin
- Deaths: 14
- Injuries: 1,000 (Note: 17 critical (some later died), 37 severe, 984 temporary vision problems)
- Perpetrator: Aum Shinrikyo
- No. of participants: 10
- Motive: Doomsday cult philosophy and disruption of police investigation into the cult

The Tokyo subway sarin attack (Japanese: 地下鉄サリン事件, Hepburn: Chikatetsu sarin jiken; lit. 'subway sarin incident') was a domestic chemical terrorist attack perpetrated on 20 March 1995, in Tokyo, Japan, by members of the Aum Shinrikyo cult. In five coordinated attacks, the perpetrators released sarin, a nerve agent, on three lines of the Tokyo Metro (then Teito Rapid Transit Authority) during rush hour, killing 14 people, severely injuring 50 (some of whom later died), and causing temporary vision problems for nearly 1,000 others. The attack was directed against trains passing through Kasumigaseki and Nagatachō, where the National Diet (Japanese parliament) is headquartered in Tokyo.

The group, led by Shoko Asahara, had already carried out several assassinations and terrorist attacks using sarin, including the Matsumoto sarin attack nine months earlier. They had also produced several other nerve agents, including VX for assassination attempts, and attempted to produce Bacillus anthracis and botulinum toxin for bioterrorism. Asahara had been made aware of a police raid scheduled for 22 March and had planned the Tokyo subway attack in order to hinder police investigations into the cult and perhaps spark the apocalypse the leader of the group had prophesied.

In the raid following the attack, police arrested many senior members of the cult. Police activity continued throughout the summer, and over 200 members were arrested, including Asahara. Thirteen of the senior Aum management, including Asahara himself, were sentenced to death and later executed; many others were given prison sentences up to life. As of 2026 the attack remains the deadliest modern incident defined as terrorism in Japan. (Note: The definition of "terrorism" has changed over time; sporadic rebel clashes and/or raids throughout Japanese history can also be seen as a form of terrorism.)

== Background ==
=== Aum Shinrikyo ===
==== Origins ====
The symbol of Aum Shinrikyo

Aum Shinrikyo was founded in 1984 as a yoga and meditation class, initially known as Oumu Shinsen no Kai (オウム神仙の会; "Aum Divine Beings' Society"), by pharmacist Chizuo Matsumoto. The group believed in a doctrine revolving around a syncretic mixture of Indian and Tibetan Buddhism, as well as Christian and Hindu beliefs, especially relating to the Hindu god Shiva. They believed Armageddon to be inevitable in the form of a global war involving the United States and Japan; that non-members were doomed to eternal hell, but could be saved if killed by cult members; and that only members of the cult would survive the apocalypse, and would afterwards build the Kingdom of Shambhala.

In 1987, the group rebranded itself and established a New York branch. In 1988, it opened a headquarters in Fujinomiya. Around this time, the mental health of Matsumoto, now going by the name Shoko Asahara, deteriorated – he developed a health anxiety and expressed suicidal views.

In August 1989, the group was granted official religious corporation status by the Tokyo Metropolitan Government, giving it privileges such as tax breaks and freedom from governmental oversight. This recognition caused dramatic growth, including an increase in net worth from less than 430,000,000 Japanese yen to over ¥100,000,000,000 (approximately US$7,000,000 to US$1,300,000,000 in 2024) over the next six years, and an increase in membership from around 20 members to around 20,000 by 1992.

The drastically increasing popularity of the group saw an increase in violent behavior from its members. In 1988, a member of the cult, Terayuki Majima, accidentally drowned during a ritual. His body was cremated, with the remaining bones ground up and scattered over a nearby lake. In February 1989, Majima's friend, a fellow member of the group, was murdered by members acting under Asahara's orders, after he became disillusioned and tried to leave.

In November 1989, six Aum Shinrikyo members were involved in the murder of Tsutsumi Sakamoto and his family. Sakamoto had been working on a class-action lawsuit against the cult. Asahara had previously advanced the concept of 'poa': a doctrine which stated that people with bad karma were doomed to an eternity in hell, unless they were 'rebirthed' through intervention by 'enlightened people', and that it was acceptable to kill those at risk of bad karma to save them from hell.

==== Early attempts to seize power ====
Asahara had experienced delusions of grandeur as early as 1985. In his meditation sessions during this time, he claimed that the god Shiva had been revealed to him, and had appointed him 'Abiraketsu no Mikoto' ('The god of light who leads the armies of the gods'), who was to build the Kingdom of Shambhala, a utopian society made up of those who had developed 'psychic powers'.

In 1990, Asahara announced that the group would run 25 candidates in the election that year to the Japanese Diet, under the banner of Shinrito (真理党, "Truth Party"). Despite showing confidence in their ability to gain seats in the diet, the party received only 1,783 votes. The failure to achieve power legitimately, blamed by Asahara on an external conspiracy propagated by "Freemasons and Jews", caused him to order the cult to produce botulinum and phosgene in order to overthrow the Japanese government. As members became disillusioned with the group, following contact with the outside world made during the election campaign, and defected, an attitude among the remaining members that 'the unenlightened' did not deserve salvation became accepted.

Attempts to stockpile botulinum toxin proved unsuccessful. Seiichi Endo – one of the members tasked with acquiring botulinum toxin – collected soil samples from the Ishikari River, and attempted to produce the toxin using three 10,000-litre (2,600 US gal) capacity fermenters. In total, around 50 batches of 9,000 litres (2,400 US gal) of a crude broth were produced – however, the cult did not attempt to purify the broth, which mostly would have consisted of bacterial cultivation media. One member fell into one of the fermenters and nearly drowned, but otherwise suffered no ill effects.

Despite mouse bioassays run by Tomomasu Nakagawa, another cult member assisting Endo, returning no toxic effects, in April 1990 the crude broth was loaded into three trucks equipped with custom spray devices, which was to be sprayed at two US naval bases, Narita airport, the Diet building, the Imperial Palace, and the headquarters of a rival religious group.

Simultaneously, Asahara announced that the coming apocalyptic war could not save people outside of the cult, and that members should attend a three-day seminar in Ishigakijima in order to seek shelter. The spraying attacks failed to cause any ill effects among the population. 1,270 people attended the seminar, many of them becoming devout monks.

With the intention of building a compound with a phosgene plant, and facilities to manufacture VX and chlorine gas, Aum Shinrikyo used 14 dummy companies to purchase acres of land in Namino, now part of Aso city, and began construction. However, public attitudes towards the cult had become very negative due to suspicions around the cult's illegal activities. These attitudes were exacerbated once it was revealed to the surrounding community that the group had acted illegally. In October 1990, a police investigation resulted in the arrests of several Aum members, causing Asahara to fear a police raid. He ordered the destruction of all biological and chemical weapon stockpiles, and for the cult to focus on legitimate, non-violent strategies only.

==== Restarting violent activity ====
After the destruction of the illegal weapon stockpiles, the cult relied on 'mainstream' methods to attract other members – this included frequent television appearances by Asahara, as well as the setting up of the 'Aum Shinrikyo broadcasting' radio station in Russia in April 1992. However, starting in late 1992, Asahara's mental health deteriorated further – he began to complain of hallucinations and paranoia, and he withdrew from public appearances (except on Aum Shinrikyo Broadcasting), claiming society was preventing him from fulfilling his destiny as Christ. The concurrent replacement of the previously predominantly female group of top advisers with a more aggressive male group led to the gradual restarting of the violent campaign to seize power. At some point in 1992, Asahara published Declaring Myself the Christ, in which he identified himself with the "Lamb of God".

He outlined a doomsday prophecy, which included a Third World War, and described a final conflict culminating in a nuclear Armageddon, borrowing the term from the Book of Revelation. His purported mission was to take upon himself the sins of the world, and he claimed he could transfer to his followers spiritual power and take away their sins. Asahara claimed to be able to see dark conspiracies everywhere promulgated by Jews, Freemasons, the Dutch, the British royal family, and rival Japanese religions.

The president of the Okamura ironworks, an industrial plant facing debt troubles, was a member of the cult who consulted with Asahara about a takeover strategy. In September 1992, Asahara was made president of the ironworks, resulting in 90% of staff being dismissed or leaving due to the 'Aum-ification' of the plant. These workers were replaced with other members of the group. Over the course of 1993, the cult smuggled AK-74 rifles and 5.45x39mm bullets, and began to prototype rifles based on the AK-74 design.

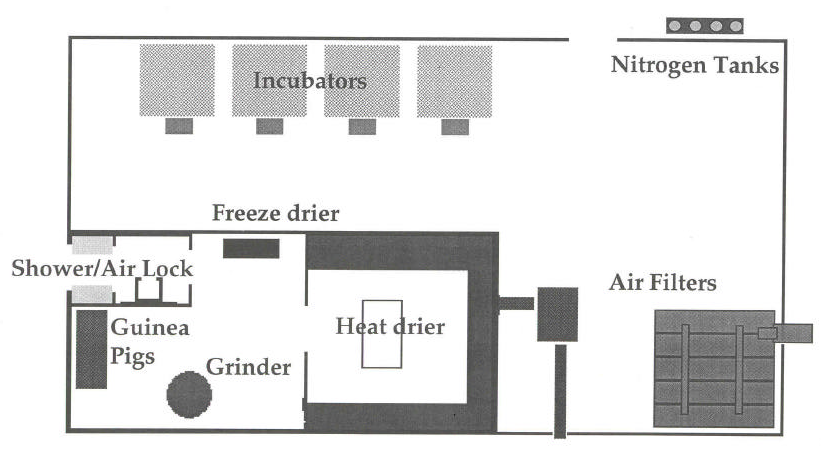
The layout of the Aum Shinrikyo biological weapons facility

Under the oversight of Endo, the biological weapons division of the cult resumed – this time pursuing botulinum toxin and anthrax, using improved 200-litre (53 US gal) drum fermenters at their Kameido facility. Again, the group did not attempt to purify the resulting product, which resembled a foul-smelling brown slurry. Further failed attacks on individuals were attempted in 1993 and 1994 using botulinum – first using a homemade sprayer mounted to a car, and then by mixing with juice – but neither had any effects. Five days before the sarin attack on the Tokyo subways, botulinum was dispersed in a failed attack on Kasumigaseki station – a dissident member had replaced the active compound with water, but the cult had failed to acquire an active strain of C. botulinum.

The Aum anthrax program was a failure – despite having access to a sympathiser outside of the group who could acquire anthrax spores, the strain received by the group was a Sterne vaccine strain incapable of causing harm. It was unclear why, despite having this knowledge, the group executed two attacks in 1993 using this vaccine strain – once from the roof of the headquarters building in Kameido, and once from a truck with a custom spraying device, aimed at the Diet building, Imperial Palace, and Tokyo Tower. Both attacks caused no effects other than a foul smell, reported by passers-by.

In the summer of 1993, Endo attempted a different strategy – by desiccating the slurry, the B. anthracis spores could be spread as a powder, rather than through spraying – this was achieved with a crude hot air dryer. Nakagawa has claimed that an attempt was made to spread this powder through the centre of Tokyo, but this, also, had no effects. The total failure of the biological weapons program had, by mid-1993, convinced Asahara to focus on the chemical weapons division under Masami Tsuchiya. While Endo would be promoted within the cult to 'health minister' in 1994 – reflecting his seniority – no further attacks using biological weapons were attempted.

=== Chemical weapon production ===
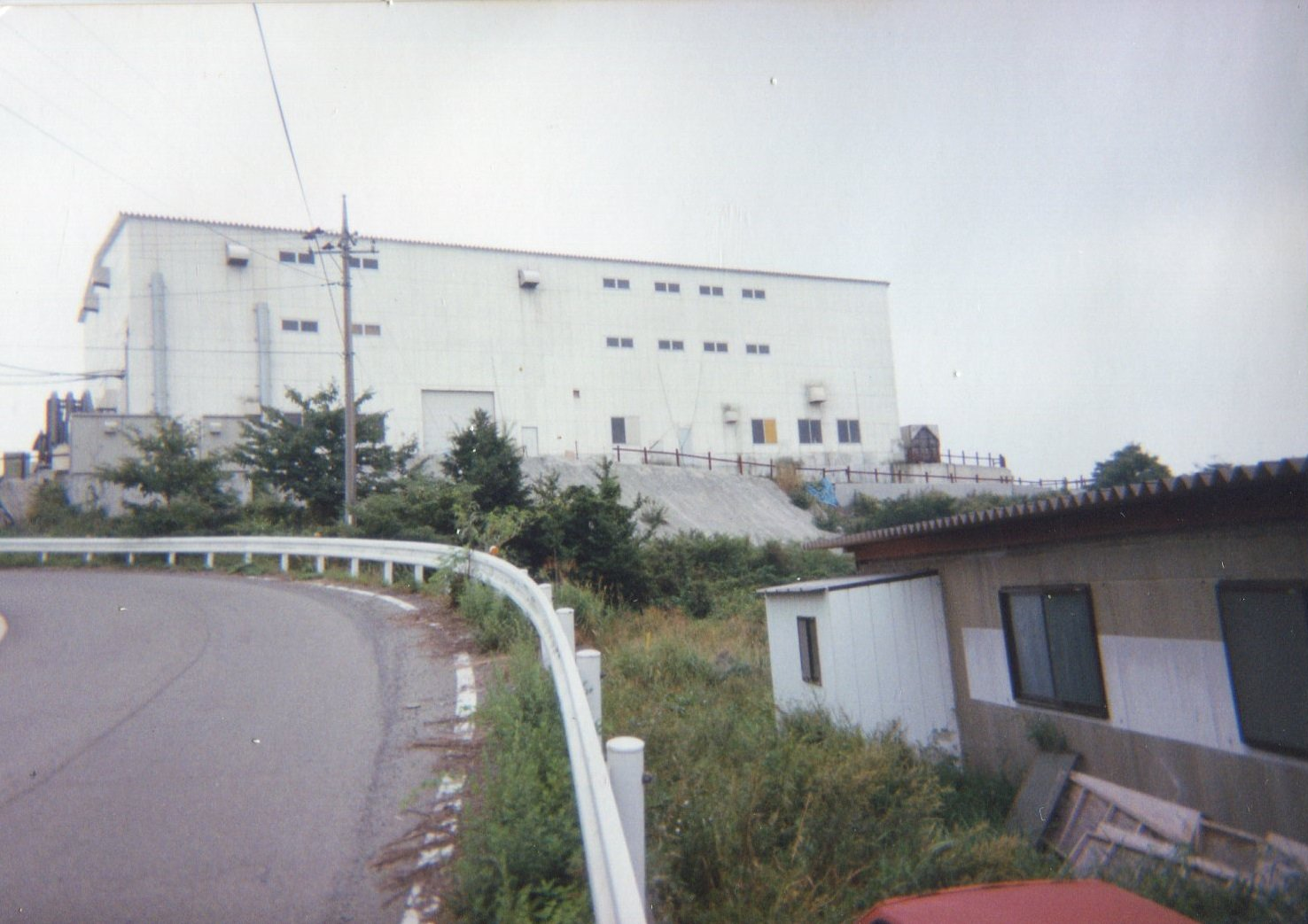
The Aum Shinrikyo facility in Kamikuishiki, 8 September 1996

In November 1992, Tsuchiya established a small laboratory in their Kamikuishiki complex. After initial research at Tsukuba University, where he had previously studied chemistry, he suggested to Hideo Murai – a senior Aum advisor who had tasked him with researching chemical weapons in November 1992, out of fear that the cult would soon be attacked with them – that the most cost-effective substance to synthesize would be sarin.

Murai was ordered to produce a small amount. Within a month, the necessary equipment had been ordered and installed, and 10–20 grams (0.35–0.71 oz) of sarin had been produced via synthetic procedures derived from the five-step DHMP process as originally described by IG Farben in 1938, and as used by the Allies after World War II.

After this small quantity had been produced, Murai ordered Tsuchiya to produce about 70 tonnes (150,000 lb). When Tsuchiya protested, noting that this level of scaling was not feasible in a research laboratory, a chemical plant was ordered to be built alongside the biological production facility in the Fujigamine district of Kamikuishiki, to be labeled Satyan-7 ('Truth'). The specialized equipment and substantial chemicals needed to run the facility were purchased using shell companies under Hasegawa Chemical, a chemical company already owned by Aum. At the same time, in September 1993, Asahara and 24 other cult members traveled from Tokyo to Perth, Australia, bringing generators, tools, protective equipment, including gas masks and respirators, and chemicals to make sarin.

After repurchasing chemicals confiscated by customs, the group chartered aircraft from Perth to Banjawarn Station, where they searched for uranium deposits to make nuclear weapons and may have tested the efficacy of the synthesized sarin on animals. They remained in Australia for eight days and attempted to return in October 1993, but were denied visas. In October 1994, Banjawarn Station was sold by Aum for AU$150,000 less than market rate. The new buyers noted that the previous owners wanted the property sold as soon as possible. The group left behind several drums of hazardous and toxic chemicals, and empty bottles of sake strewn about the property. Following news of the subway attacks, the new owners became suspicious and contacted the Australian Federal Police, who inspected the property and found evidence of past chemical weapons testing.

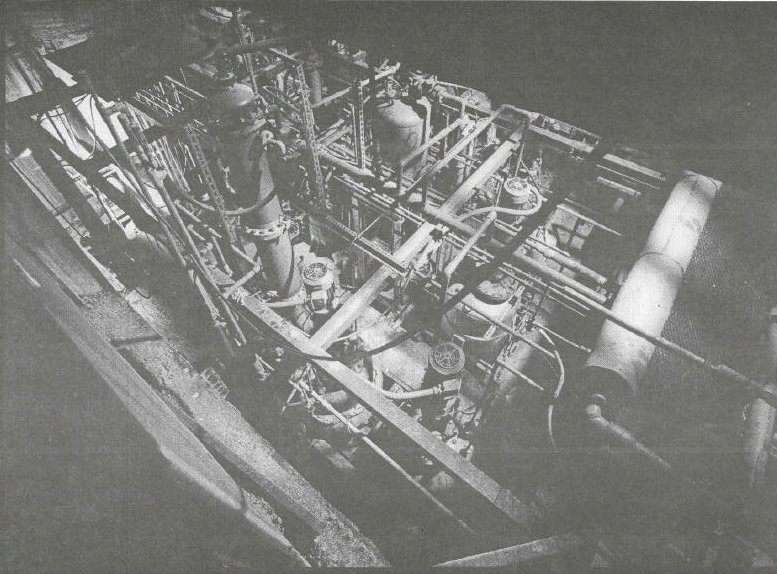
An overhead view of the Satyan-7 chemical weapon facility

In September 1993, the Satyan-7 facility was declared ready for occupancy, with the capacity to produce about 40–50 litres (11–13 US gal) of sarin, equipped with 30-litre (7.9 US gal) capacity mixing flasks within protective hoods, and eventually employing 100 Aum members. The UN later estimated the value of the building and its contents at $30 million.

Despite the safety features and often state-of-the-art equipment and practices, the operation of the facility was very unsafe – one analyst later described the cult as having a "high degree of book learning, but virtually nothing in the way of technical skill."

When the facility developed leaks, buckets were used to contain spills. Several technicians inhaled fumes on repeated occasions, developing 'symptoms ranging from nosebleeds to convulsions', and toxic chemicals leaked from the site and into the soil. Citizens lodged complaints about foul smells several times, with the cult claiming that the US Army had assaulted the complex with poison gas. An accident at the plant in November 1994 forced the suspension of the production of chemical agents.

By December, Tsuchiya had accumulated about 3 kilograms (6.6 lb) of sarin. From this, two assassination attempts were made on Daisaku Ikeda, leader of Soka Gakkai, a rival Japanese religious movement, in mid-1994. The first attack involved a truck with a spraying system, as previously used. The spraying system malfunctioned, spraying sarin into the truck, mildly poisoning the operators.

The second attack utilized a truck modified to include an evaporation system based on heating sarin over a gas stove fire. Despite prior warnings from cult member Kazuyoshi Takizawa, the truck caught fire during the dissemination, severely poisoning the driver Tomomitsu Niimi and causing Niimi and Murai, the operators, to flee. Niimi received an injection of atropine and pralidoxime iodine, saving his life.

Despite the failure of the attack, the members of Aum were convinced of sarin's efficacy, prompting Asahara to appoint Takizawa in charge of operations of Satyan-7. Tsuchiya was assigned to several other projects and manufactured several psychoactives – LSD, PCP, methamphetamine, mescaline, and phenobarbital for cult activities and brainwashing. He also manufactured small amounts of phosgene, VX, soman, cyclosarin, and gunpowder. These compounds were used in several attacks and assassination attempts:

Confirmed chemical attacks executed by Aum Shinrikyo
Date	Agent	Location	Fatalities	Injuries	Comments
Late 1993-early 1994	Sarin	Tokyo	0	0	Two failed attempts to assassinate Daisaku Ikeda, leader of Soka Gakkai.
9 May 1994	Sarin	Tokyo	0	1	Attempted assassination of Taro Takimoto, an attorney working on behalf of victims of the group – Takimoto was hospitalized but made a full recovery.
27 June 1994	Sarin	Matsumoto	8	500	Matsumoto sarin attack
20 September 1994	Phosgene	Yokohama	0	1	Attempted assassination of Shoko Egawa, a journalist who had covered the 1989 disappearance of Tsutsumi Sakamoto.
Late 1994	VX	Various	0–20	unknown	VX was allegedly used to assassinate up to 20 dissident Aum members.
28 November and 2 December 1994	VX	Tokyo	0	1	Two attempts to murder a man assisting dissident Aum members, man hospitalized for 45 days.
12 December 1994	VX	Osaka	1	0	Posing as joggers, Aum members sprayed Tadahito Hamaguchi, a man who the cult believed was spying on them, with VX from a syringe. He was pronounced dead four days later.
4 January 1995	VX	Tokyo	0	1	Attempted assassination of Hiroyuki Nagaoka, head of the 'Aum Shinrikyo Victim's Group' – Nagaoka was hospitalized for several weeks.
February 1995	VX	Tokyo	0	0	Attempted assassination of Ryuho Okawa, leader of the Institute for Research into Human Happiness, who had criticized the group – Okawa suffered no ill effects.
20 March 1995	Sarin	Tokyo	14	1,000	Tokyo subway sarin attack
5 May 1995	Hydrogen cyanide	Tokyo	0	4	Two vinyl bags – one containing sulfuric acid and the other containing sodium cyanide – were found, on fire, in the toilet of a subway station. Four injuries.

=== Matsumoto sarin attack ===
In June 1994, Asahara ordered the cult to assassinate the judges involved in deciding a commercial land dispute involving the cult, due to his belief that they would not deliver a favourable judgement. About a week later, on 27 June, 30 litres (7.9 US gal) of sarin was loaded onto a truck equipped with a fan, heater, and pump – six members, pre-administered with sarin antidotes and wearing improvised gas masks, began the propagation of sarin at around 10:40 pm, spraying for around 10–20 minutes.

Due to it being a warm evening, many residents had left their windows open while they slept – the first emergency call was made at 11:09 pm. Within an hour, a mass disaster caused by an unknown toxic gas had been declared. Fifty-eight people were hospitalised, of whom seven people died in the immediate aftermath, and an eighth 14 years later, and an additional 253 people sought medical care at outpatient clinics.

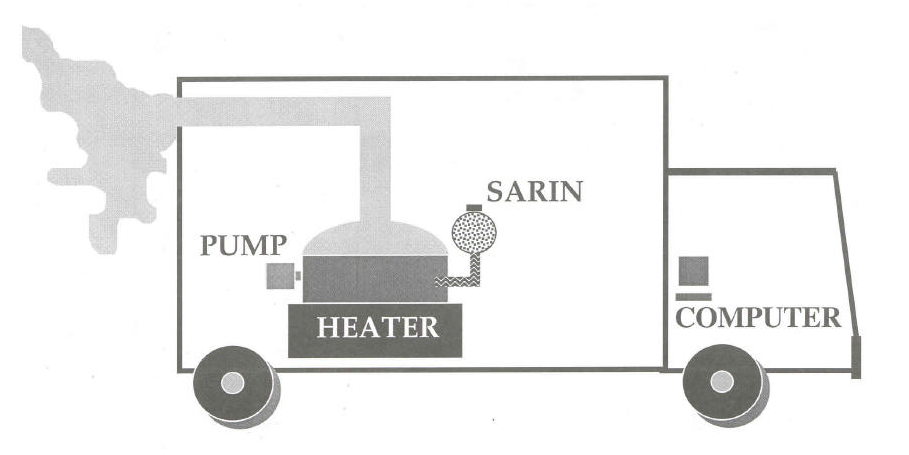
A depiction of an Aum Shinrikyo sarin truck

Investigations after the Matsumoto attack were generally inconclusive, with the primary suspect being Yoshiyuki Kōno, whose wife had been left comatose by the attack. Blame would not be clearly attributed to Aum Shinrikyo until after the subway attack, despite tipoffs – in September 1994, two anonymous letters were sent to major media outlets in Japan – the first asserting that the group were responsible for the attack, and the second claiming that Matsumoto was an open-air 'experiment of sorts', noting that the results would have been much worse if sarin had been released indoors, such as in 'a crowded subway'.

Following an accident at Satyan-7 the next month (and complaints from the surrounding communities), a police investigation revealed methylphosphonic acid and isopropyl methylphosphonic acid – the former being a degradation product of sarin, and the latter being a definitive signature of both sarin production and of failures in production. However, there was no law at the time prohibiting the production of the nerve agents. This evidence was left unacted on, but was leaked to the Yomiuri Shimbun in January 1995, alerting Asahara and the cult, and causing Nakagawa and Endo to begin the process of destroying and/or hiding all nerve agents and biological weapons, which lasted until the end of February.

=== Preparation for the attack ===
Fingerprint evidence for an Aum member linked to an earlier kidnapping, in addition to the sarin-contaminated soil samples, caused the police to set a raid date for 22 March. Asahara was made aware of the impending raid by two cult members inside the Japan Self-Defense Forces, and ordered an attack on Tokyo subway lines close to the Tokyo Metropolitan Police Department on the morning of 20 March – possibly as a desperate attack to initiate the apocalypse.

To aid in this, Tsuchiya was ordered by Endo to produce sarin again on 18 March – due to a lack of normal precursors as a result of the chemical destruction process, the sarin produced was of a lower quality and caused the normally colourless sarin to appear brown. 30 kilograms (66 lb) of the chemical was manufactured and stored in a large container, from which it was decanted into plastic bags. Later forensic analysis found that the sarin utilised in the attack was roughly half as pure as that used in the Matsumoto attack.

== Attack ==
On Monday, 20 March 1995, five members of Aum Shinrikyo launched a chemical attack on the Tokyo subway (on lines that are part of the present-day Tokyo Metro), one of the world's busiest commuter transport systems, at the peak of the morning rush hour. The chemical agent used, liquid sarin, was contained in plastic bags which each team then wrapped in newspaper. Each perpetrator carried two packets totaling approximately 0.9 litres (30 US fl oz) of sarin, except Yasuo Hayashi, who carried three bags totalling approximately 1.3 litres (44 US fl oz) of sarin. Aum originally planned to spread the sarin as an aerosol but did not follow through with it. Sarin has an LD_{50} of 550 micrograms per kilogram (0.0039 gr/lb), corresponding to 38.5 milligrams (0.594 gr) for a 70-kilogram (150 lb) human; however, dispersal issues dramatically reduced its effectiveness.

Carrying their packets of sarin and umbrellas with sharpened tips, the perpetrators boarded their appointed trains. At prearranged stations, the sarin packets were dropped and punctured several times with the sharpened tip of the umbrella. Each perpetrator then got off the train and exited the station to meet his accomplice with a car. Leaving the punctured packets on the floor allowed the sarin to leak out into the train car and stations. This sarin affected passengers, subway workers, and those who came into contact with them. Sarin is the most volatile of the nerve agents, which means that it can quickly and easily evaporate from a liquid into a vapor and spread into the environment. People can be exposed to the vapor even if they do not come in contact with the liquid form of sarin. Because it evaporates so quickly, sarin presents an immediate but short-lived threat.

=== Chiyoda Line ===
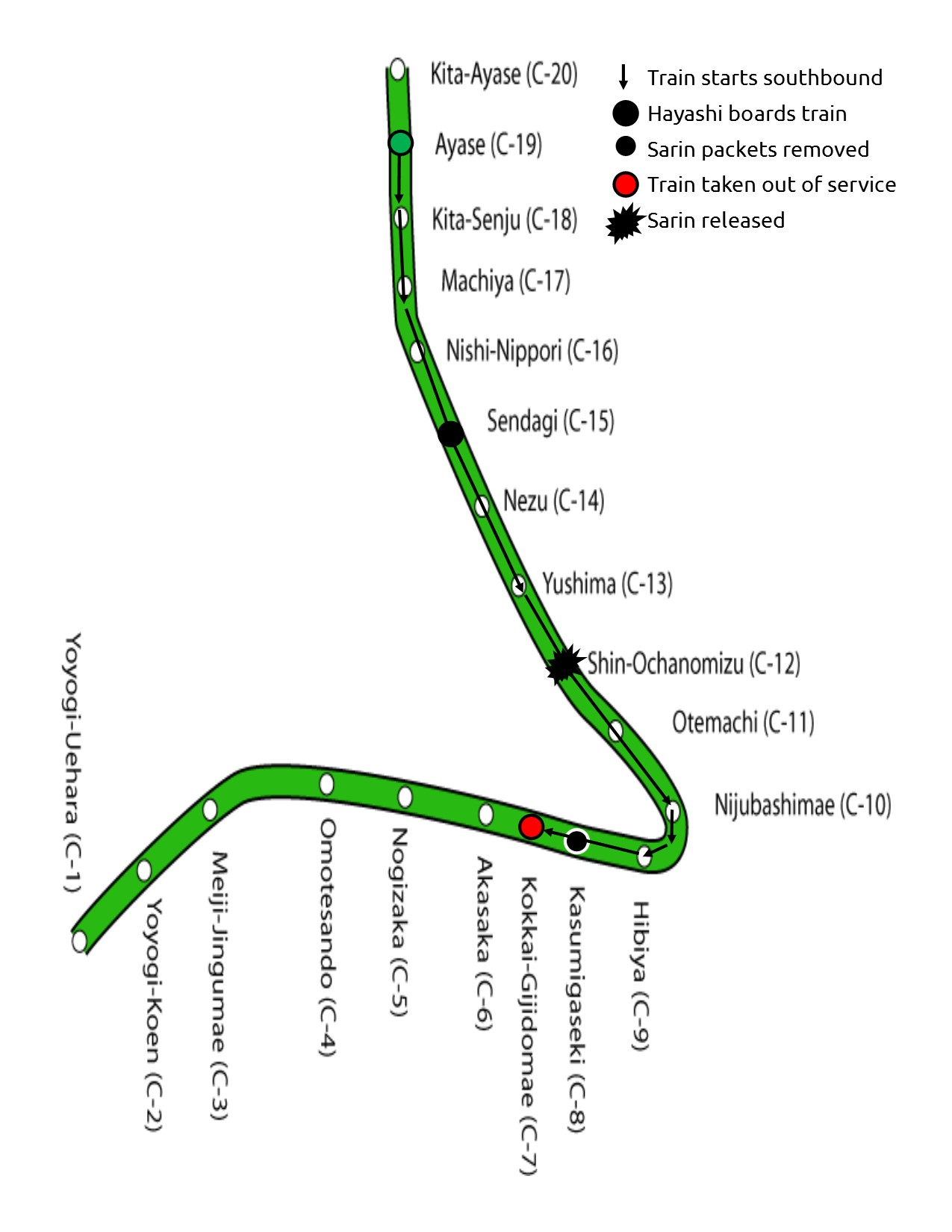
A map of the attack on the Yoyogi-Uehara bound Chiyoda Line train

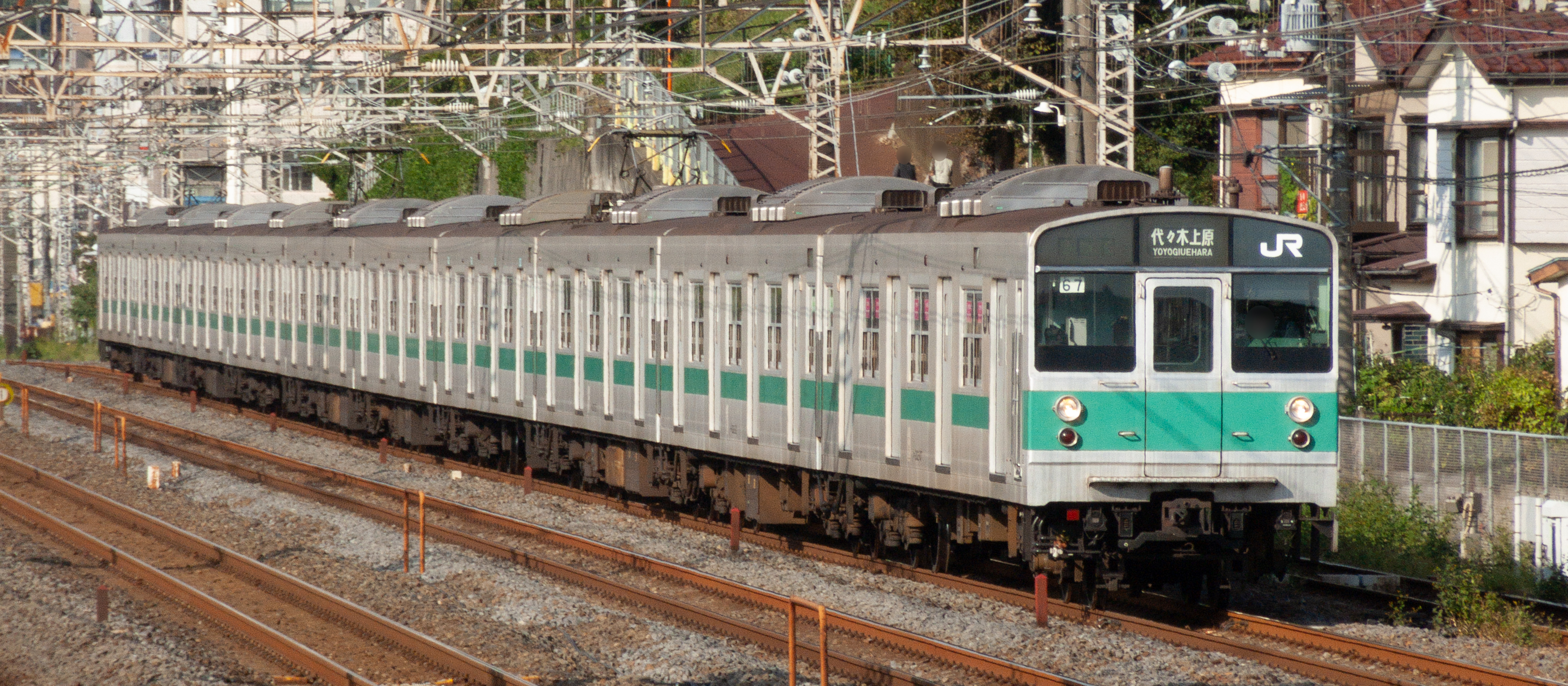
JR East 203 series set 67, the Chiyoda Line train involved as A725K

The team of Ikuo Hayashi and Tomomitsu Niimi were assigned to drop and puncture two sarin packets on the Chiyoda Line. Hayashi was the perpetrator and Niimi was his getaway driver. On the way to Sendagi Station, Niimi purchased newspapers to wrap the sarin packets in—the Japan Communist Party's Akahata and the Sōka Gakkai's Seikyo Shimbun.

Hayashi eventually chose to use Akahata. Wearing a surgical mask commonly worn by the Japanese during cold and flu season, Hayashi boarded the first car of southwest-bound 07:48 Chiyoda Line train number A725K (JR East 203 series set 67) which was running on a through service from the Joban Line. As the train approached Shin-Ochanomizu Station, the central business district in Chiyoda, he punctured one of his two bags of sarin, leaving the other untouched, and exited the train at Shin-Ochanomizu.

The train proceeded down the line with the punctured bag of sarin leaking until four stops later at Kasumigaseki Station. There, the bags were removed and eventually disposed of by station attendants, of whom two died. The train continued on to the next station where it was completely stopped, evacuated and cleaned.

=== Marunouchi Line ===
==== Ogikubo-bound ====
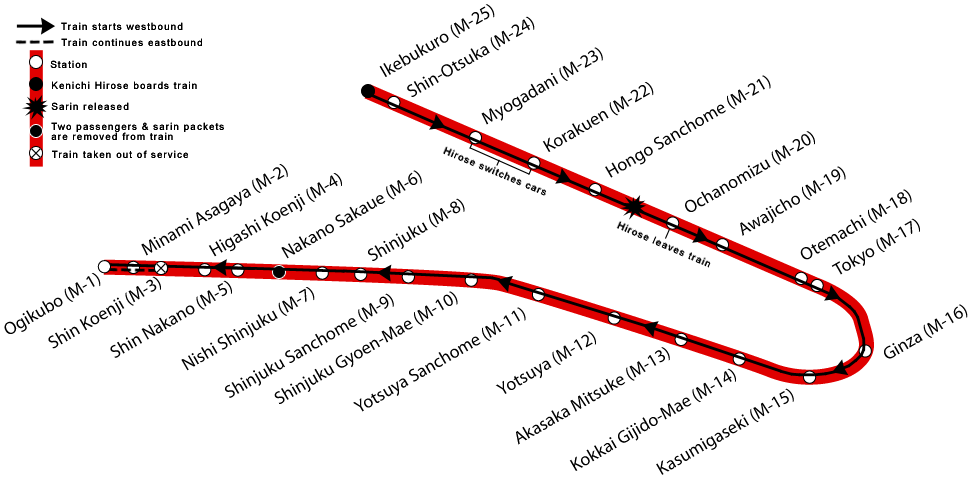
A map of the attack on the Ogikubo-bound Marunouchi Line train

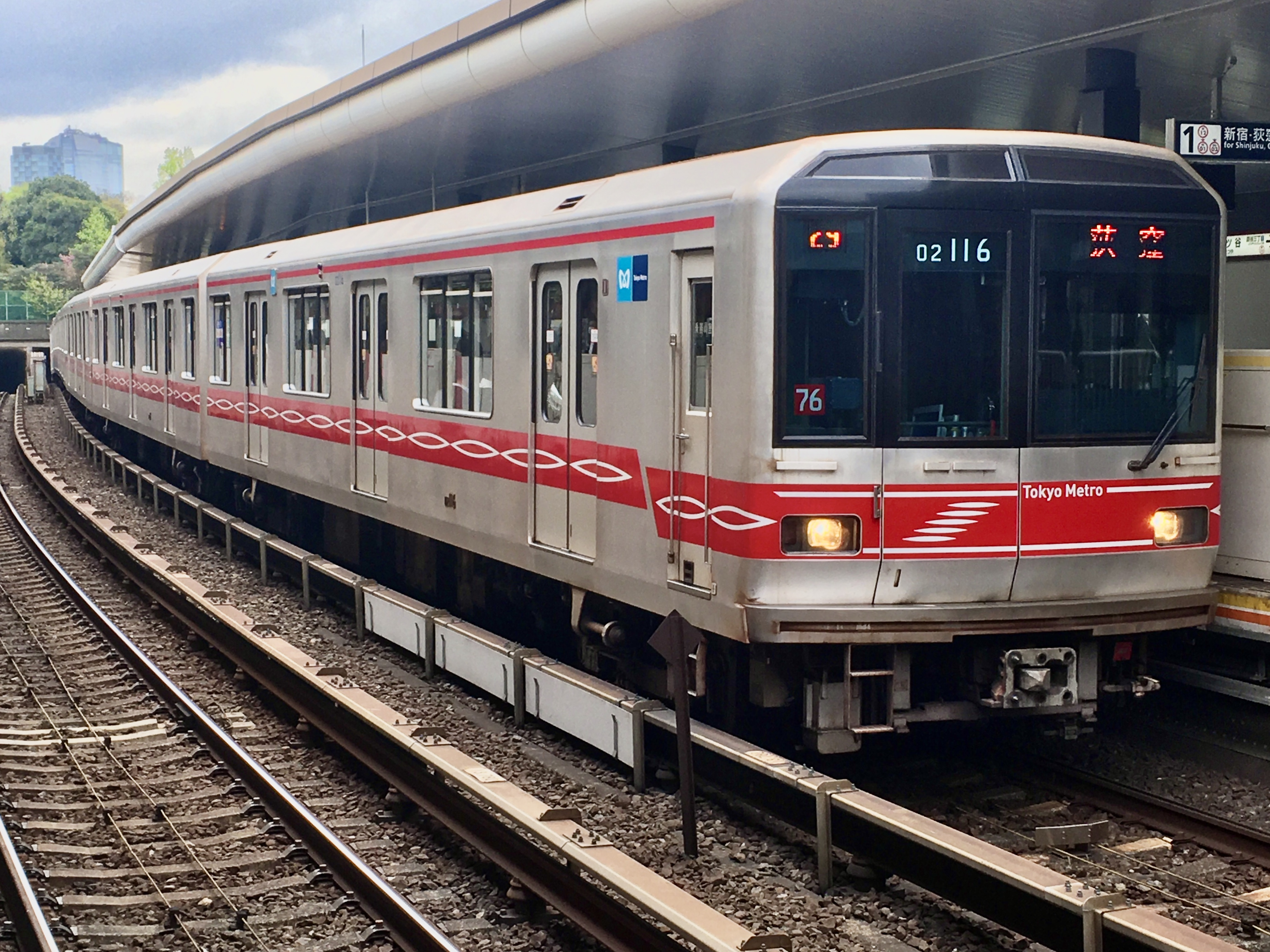
02 series set 16, the train involved as B777

Two men, Ken'ichi Hirose and Koichi Kitamura, were assigned to release two sarin packets on the westbound Marunouchi Line destined for Ogikubo Station. The pair left Aum headquarters in Shibuya at 6:00 am and drove to Yotsuya Station. There Hirose boarded a westbound Marunouchi Line train, then changed to a northbound JR East Saikyō Line train at Shinjuku Station and got off at Ikebukuro Station. He then bought a sports tabloid to wrap the sarin packets in and boarded the second car of Marunouchi Line train A777 (02 series set 16).

As Hirose was about to release the sarin, he heard loud noises on the usually quiet train, and believed the newspaper-wrapped packets had caught the attention of a schoolgirl. To avoid further suspicion, he got off the train at either Myogadani or Korakuen Station and moved to the third car instead of the second.

As the train approached Ochanomizu Station, Hirose dropped the newspapers to the floor, repeated an Aum mantra and punctured both sarin packets with so much force that he bent the tip of his sharpened umbrella. Both packets were successfully broken, and all 900 millilitres (30 US fl oz) of sarin was released onto the floor of the train. Hirose then departed the train at Ochanomizu and left via Kitamura's car waiting outside the station. Hirose's clumsy release of the sarin resulted in him accidentally poisoning himself, but he was able to administer an antidote stored in Kitamura's car.

At Nakano-sakaue Station, 19 stops later, two severely injured passengers were carried out of the train car (one of these two passengers was the only fatality from this attack). Station attendant Sumio Nishimura removed the sarin packets. The train continued with sarin still on the floor of the third car. Five stops later, at 08:38, the train reached Ogikubo Station, the end of the Marunouchi Line, where new passengers boarded the train. The train continued eastbound until it was finally taken out of service at Shin-Kōenji Station two stops later. The attack resulted in the abovementioned passenger's death, with further 358 passengers being seriously injured.

==== Ikebukuro-bound ====
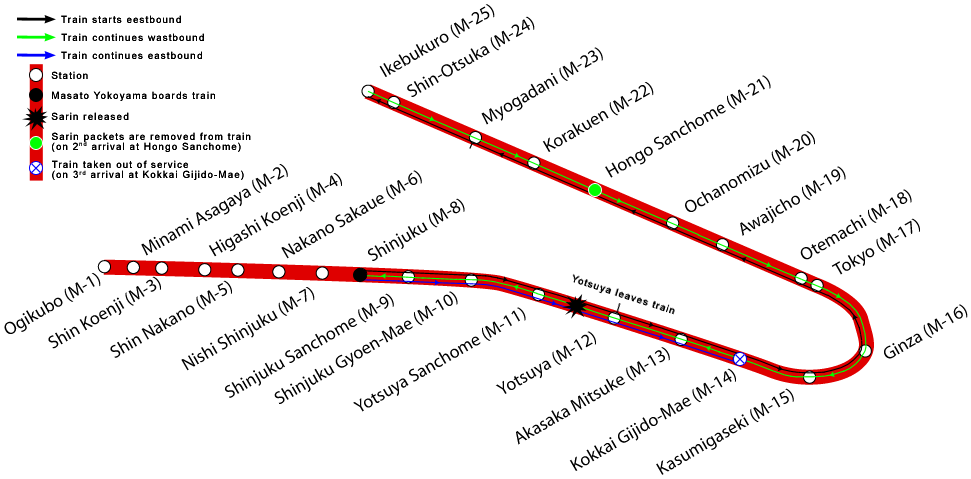
A map of the attack on the Ikebukuro-bound Marunouchi Line train

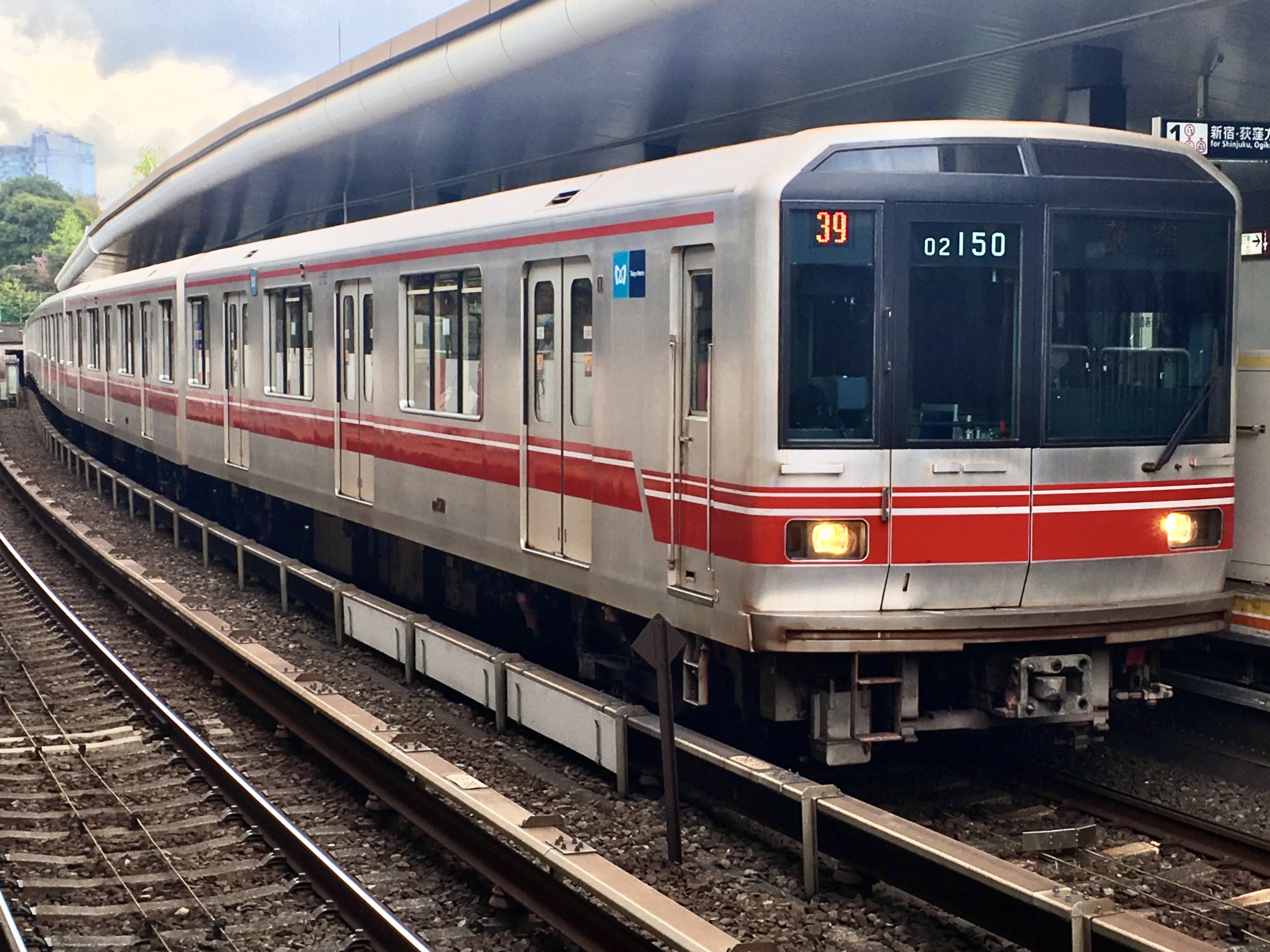
02 series set 50, the train involved as B701/A801/B901

Masato Yokoyama and his driver Kiyotaka Tonozaki were assigned to release sarin on the Ikebukuro-bound Marunouchi Line. On the way to Shinjuku Station, Tonozaki stopped to allow Yokoyama to buy a copy of Nihon Keizai Shimbun, to wrap the two sarin packets. When they arrived at the station, Yokoyama put on a wig and fake glasses and boarded the fifth car of the Ikebukuro-bound 07:39 Marunouchi Line train number B801 (02 series set 50).

As the train approached Yotsuya Station, Yokoyama began poking at the sarin packets. When the train reached the next station, he fled the scene with Tonozaki, leaving the sarin packets on the train car. The packets were not fully punctured. During his drop, Yokoyama left one packet fully intact, while the other packet was only punctured once (and with a small hole), resulting in the sarin being released relatively slowly.

The train reached the end of the line, Ikebukuro, at 08:30 where it would head back in the opposite direction. Before it departed the train was evacuated and searched, but the searchers failed to discover the sarin packets. The train departed Ikebukuro Station at 08:32 as the Shinjuku-bound A801. Passengers soon became ill and alerted station attendants of the sarin-soaked newspapers at Kōrakuen Station. One station later, at Hongō-sanchōme, staff removed the sarin packets and mopped the floor, but the train continued on to Shinjuku. After arriving at 09:09, the train once again began to make its way back to Ikebukuro as the B901. The train was finally put out of service at Kokkai-gijidō-mae Station in Chiyoda at 09:27, one hour and forty minutes after Yokoyama punctured the sarin packet. The attack resulted in no fatalities, but over 200 people were left in serious condition.

=== Hibiya Line ===
==== Tōbu Dōbutsu Kōen-bound ====
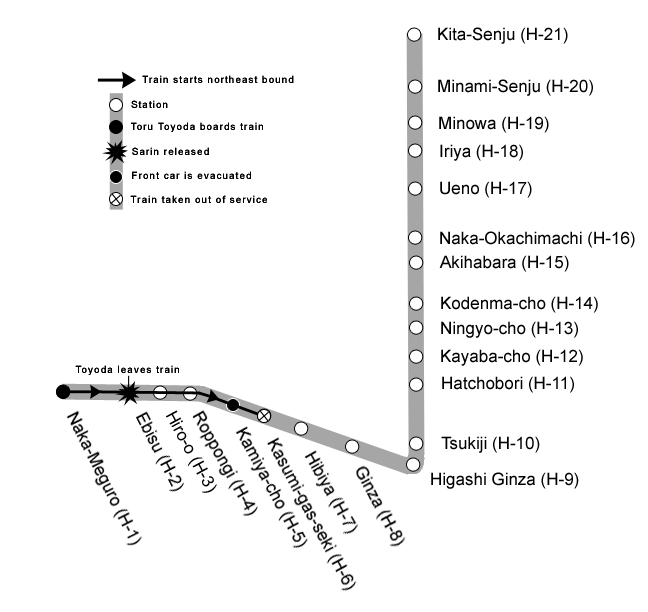
A map of the attack on the Tōbu Dōbutsu Kōen-bound Hibiya Line train

Toru Toyoda and his driver Katsuya Takahashi were assigned to release sarin on the northeast-bound Hibiya Line.

The pair, with Takahashi driving, left Aum headquarters in Shibuya at 06:30. After purchasing a copy of Hochi Shimbun and wrapping his two sarin packets, Toyoda arrived at Naka-Meguro Station where he boarded the first car of northeast-bound 07:59 Hibiya Line train number B711T (Tobu 20000 series set 11). Sitting close to the door, he set the sarin packets on the floor. When the train arrived at the next station, Ebisu, Toyoda punctured both packets and got off the train. He was on the train for a total of two minutes, by far the quickest sarin drop out of the five attacks that day.

Two stops later, at Roppongi Station, passengers in the train's first car began to feel the effects of the sarin and began to open the windows. By Kamiyacho Station, the next stop, the passengers in the car had begun panicking. The first car was evacuated and several passengers were immediately taken to a hospital. Still, with the first car empty, the train continued down the line for one more stop until it was completely evacuated at Kasumigaseki Station. This attack killed one person and seriously injured 532 others.

==== Naka-Meguro-bound ====
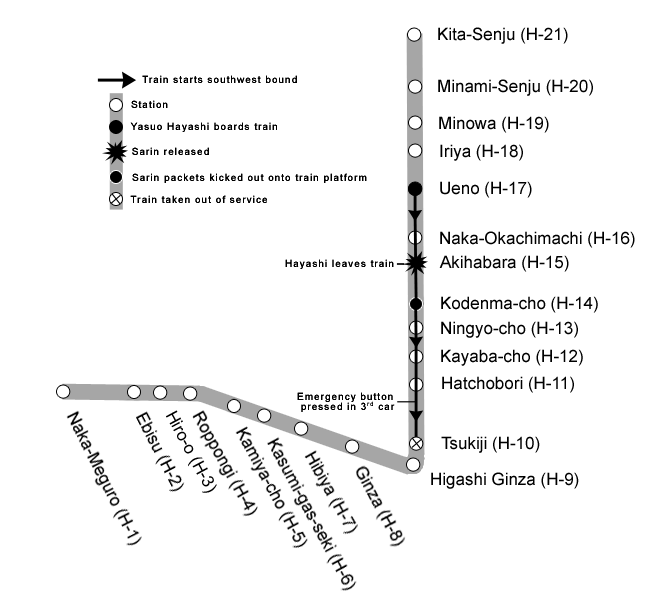
A map of the attack on the Naka-Meguro-bound Hibiya Line train

Yasuo Hayashi and Shigeo Sugimoto were the team assigned to drop sarin on the southwest-bound Hibiya Line departing Kita-Senju Station for Naka-Meguro Station. Unlike the rest of the attackers, Hayashi carried three sarin packets onto the train instead of two. Prior to the attack, Hayashi asked to carry a flawed leftover packet in addition to the two others in an apparent bid to allay suspicions and prove his loyalty to the group.

After Sugimoto escorted him to Ueno Station, Hayashi boarded the third car of southwest-bound 07:43 Hibiya Line train number A720S (03 series set 10) and dropped his sarin packets to the floor. Two stops later, at Akihabara Station, he punctured two of the three packets, left the train, and arrived back at Aum headquarters with Sugimoto by 08:30. Hayashi made the most punctures of any of the perpetrators. By the next stop, passengers in the third car began to feel the effects of the sarin. Noticing the large, liquid-soaked package on the floor and assuming it was the culprit, one passenger kicked the sarin packets out of the train and onto Kodenmachō Station's subway platform. Four people in the station died as a result.

A puddle of sarin remained on the floor of the passenger car as the train continued to the next station. At 08:10, after the train pulled out of Hatchōbori Station, a passenger in the third car pressed the emergency stop button. The train was in a tunnel at the time, and was forced to proceed to Tsukiji Station, where passengers stumbled out and collapsed on the station's platform and the train was taken out of service.

The attack was originally believed to be an explosion and was thus labeled as such in media reports. Eventually, station attendants realized that the attack was not an explosion, but rather a chemical attack. At 08:35, the Hibiya Line was completely shut down and all commuters were evacuated. Between the five stations affected in this attack, 8 people died and 275 were seriously injured.

== Main perpetrators ==
Ten members of Aum Shinrikyo were responsible for carrying out the attacks: five released the sarin, while the other five served as getaway drivers.

The five duos were:

Metro line	Train	Perpetrator	Getaway driver
Chiyoda	A725K	Ikuo Hayashi (林 郁夫, Hayashi Ikuo)	Tomomitsu Niimi (新実 智光, Niimi Tomomitsu)
Marunouchi	A777	Kenichi Hirose (広瀬 健一, Hirose Ken'ichi)	Kōichi Kitamura (北村 浩一, Kitamura Kōichi)
Marunouchi	B801	Toru Toyoda (豊田 亨, Toyoda Tōru)	Katsuya Takahashi (高橋 克也, Takahashi Katsuya)
Hibiya	B711T	Masato Yokoyama (横山 真人, Yokoyama Masato)	Kiyotaka Tonozaki (外崎 清隆, Tonozaki Kiyotaka)
Hibiya	A720S	Yasuo Hayashi (林 泰男, Hayashi Yasuo)	Shigeo Sugimoto (杉本 繁郎, Sugimoto Shigeo)

Naoko Kikuchi, an eleventh member of Aum, was involved with producing the sarin.

=== Train A725K (Chiyoda Line train) ===
==== Ikuo Hayashi ====
Ikuo Hayashi was 48 years old at the time of the attacks. Prior to joining Aum, Hayashi was a senior medical doctor with "an active 'front-line' track record" at the Ministry of Science and Technology. The son of a doctor, Hayashi graduated from Keio University. He was a heart and artery specialist at Keio Hospital, which he left to become head of Circulatory Medicine at the National Sanatorium Hospital in Tokai, Ibaraki (north of Tokyo).

In 1990, Hayashi resigned his job and left his family to join Aum in the monastic order Sangha, where he became one of Asahara's favorites and was appointed the group's Minister of Healing, as which he was responsible for administering a variety of "treatments" to Aum members, including sodium pentothal and electric shocks to those whose loyalty was suspect. These treatments resulted in several deaths.

Hayashi later reported to the Japanese police investigators about the sarin attacks and Aum activities post-Tokyo subway attack; his cooperation with the authorities resulted in numerous arrests and convictions, and he was given a life sentence instead of death penalty.

==== Tomomitsu Niimi ====
Tomomitsu Niimi, who was Hayashi's getaway driver, was 31 years old at the time of the attacks; he was sentenced to death due to his involvement in other crimes perpetrated by Aum members. Niimi was executed at the Osaka Detention House on 6 July 2018 with six others of those principally involved.

=== Train A777 (Ogikubo-bound Marunouchi Line train) ===
==== Kenichi Hirose ====
Kenichi Hirose (12 June 1964 – 26 July 2018) was 30 years old at the time of the attacks. Holder of a postgraduate degree in physics from Waseda University, Hirose became an important member of the group's Chemical Brigade in their Ministry of Science and Technology. He was also involved in the group's Automatic Light Weapon Development scheme.

After releasing the sarin, Hirose showed symptoms of sarin poisoning. He was able to inject himself with the antidote (atropine sulphate) and was rushed to the Aum-affiliated Shinrikyo Hospital in Nakano for treatment. Medical personnel at the hospital had not been given prior notice of the attack and were consequently clueless regarding what treatment Hirose needed. When Kitamura realized that he had driven Hirose to the hospital in vain, he instead drove to Aum's headquarters in Shibuya where Ikuo Hayashi gave Hirose first aid.

Hirose was later sentenced to death for his role in the attack. His appeal against his death sentence was rejected by the Tokyo High Court on 28 July 2003 and the sentence was upheld by the Supreme Court of Japan on 6 November 2009. Hirose was executed at the Tokyo Detention House on 26 July 2018, along with five other cult members.

==== Kōichi Kitamura ====
Kōichi Kitamura (北村浩一, Kitamura Kōichi; born 16 February 1968) was 27 years old when the attack was committed. He is currently serving a life sentence for the attack and other offenses.

Kitamura is a native of Aichi Prefecture and joined Aum Shinrikyo in the late 1980s after reading a book written by leader Shoko Asahara.

During the attack he drove Hirose to the Tokyo Metro Marunouchi Line where Hirose boarded a train and punctured two bags of liquid sarin, causing the death of one person. Kitamura also aided cult fugitive Takeshi Matsumoto in hiding from justice between the months of March and April 1995 for the crime of kidnapping.

He was a fugitive until November 1996 when he was arrested in Tokorozawa, Saitama. In his first trial in May 1997 he admitted to the crimes and reportedly renounced the cult although he maintained the belief that Asahara had superpowers and his lawyer said that he still was under the spell of the cult.

Kitamura was sentenced to life imprisonment in November 1999, with the presiding judge chastising him for playing an "indispensable role" in the attack. The judge also highlighted his self-righteous motive for his crimes and pronounced the sentencing saying that:

Though the defendant knew the deadliness of the nerve gas, he took part without hesitation, believing the attack was an "act of salvation"

After the verdict was read, his lawyer said that Kitamura was still under Asahara's spell which made him a victim of the cult as well. He also said that the court had dismissed this point adding that he would discuss with him whether to appeal to the higher courts.

In January 2002, the Tokyo High Court upheld Kitamura's sentence, which he called "too harsh" given his role in the attack. The court refuted his argument and highlighted his lack of remorse as motive for upholding the sentence.

=== Train B801 (Ikebukuro-bound Marunouchi Line) ===
==== Toru Toyoda ====
Toru Toyoda (23 January 1968 – 26 July 2018) was 27 years old at the time of the attack. He studied Applied Physics at University of Tokyo's Science Department and graduated with honors. He also held a master's degree, and was about to begin doctoral studies when he joined Aum, where he belonged to the Chemical Brigade in their Ministry of Science and Technology.

Toyoda was sentenced to death. The appeal against his death sentence was rejected by the Tokyo High Court on 28 July 2003, and was upheld by the Supreme Court on 6 November 2009. Toyoda was executed at the Tokyo Detention House on 26 July 2018.

==== Katsuya Takahashi ====
Katsuya Takahashi, who was 37 years old at the time of the attack, was Toyoda's getaway driver. Takahashi was arrested in June 2012. He was the last of the wanted fugitives of the attack to be arrested.

In 2015, Takahashi was convicted for his role in the attack and was sentenced to life in prison. His appeal was rejected by the Tokyo High Court in September 2016.

=== Train B711T (Tōbu Dōbutsu Kōen-bound Hibiya Line train) ===
==== Masato Yokoyama ====
Yokoyama (19 October 1963 – 26 July 2018) was 31 at the time of the attack. He was a graduate in Applied Physics from Tokai University's Engineering Department. He worked for an electronics firm in Gunma Prefecture for three years after graduation before leaving to join Aum, where he became Undersecretary at the group's Ministry of Science and Technology. He was also involved in their Automatic Light Weapons Manufacturing scheme. Yokoyama was sentenced to death in 1999. His appeals were rejected, and he was executed at the Nagoya Detention House on 26 July 2018.

==== Kiyotaka Tonozaki ====
Kiyotaka Tonozaki, a high school graduate who joined the group in 1987, was Yokoyama's getaway driver. Tonozaki was 31 years old at the time of the attacks. He was a member of the group's Ministry of Construction. Tonozaki was sentenced to life imprisonment.

=== Train A720S (Naka-Meguro-bound Hibiya Line train) ===
==== Yasuo Hayashi ====
Yasuo Hayashi was 37 years old at the time of the attacks, and was the oldest person at the group's Ministry of Science and Technology. He studied Artificial Intelligence at Kogakuin University; after graduation he traveled to India where he studied yoga. He then became an Aum member, taking vows in 1988 and rising to the number three position in the group's Ministry of Science and Technology.

Asahara had at one time suspected Hayashi of being a spy. The extra packet of sarin he carried was part of "ritual character test" set up by Asahara to prove his allegiance, according to the prosecution. Hayashi fled after the attacks. He was arrested 21 months later, one thousand miles from Tokyo on Ishigaki Island. He was later sentenced to death. His appeal was rejected by the Tokyo High Court in 2008. Hayashi was executed at the Sendai Detention House on 26 July 2018.

==== Shigeo Sugimoto ====
Hayashi's getaway driver was 36-year-old Shigeo Sugimoto, whose lawyers argued he played only a minor role in the attack, but the argument was rejected and he was sentenced to life in prison.

=== Naoko Kikuchi ===
Naoko Kikuchi, who was involved in producing the sarin gas, was 24 years old at the time of the attacks. She was arrested after a tipoff in June 2012, but was acquitted in 2015 on the grounds that she was unaware of the plot.

== Aftermath ==
Following the attack, Japanese police raided Aum Shinrikyo facilities and arrested members. The cult's headquarters in Tokyo was raided by police on 16 May 1995. Due to fears that armed cult members might resist the raid, the 1st Airborne Brigade of the Japan Ground Self-Defense Force was stationed nearby to provide support if needed.

=== Injuries and deaths ===
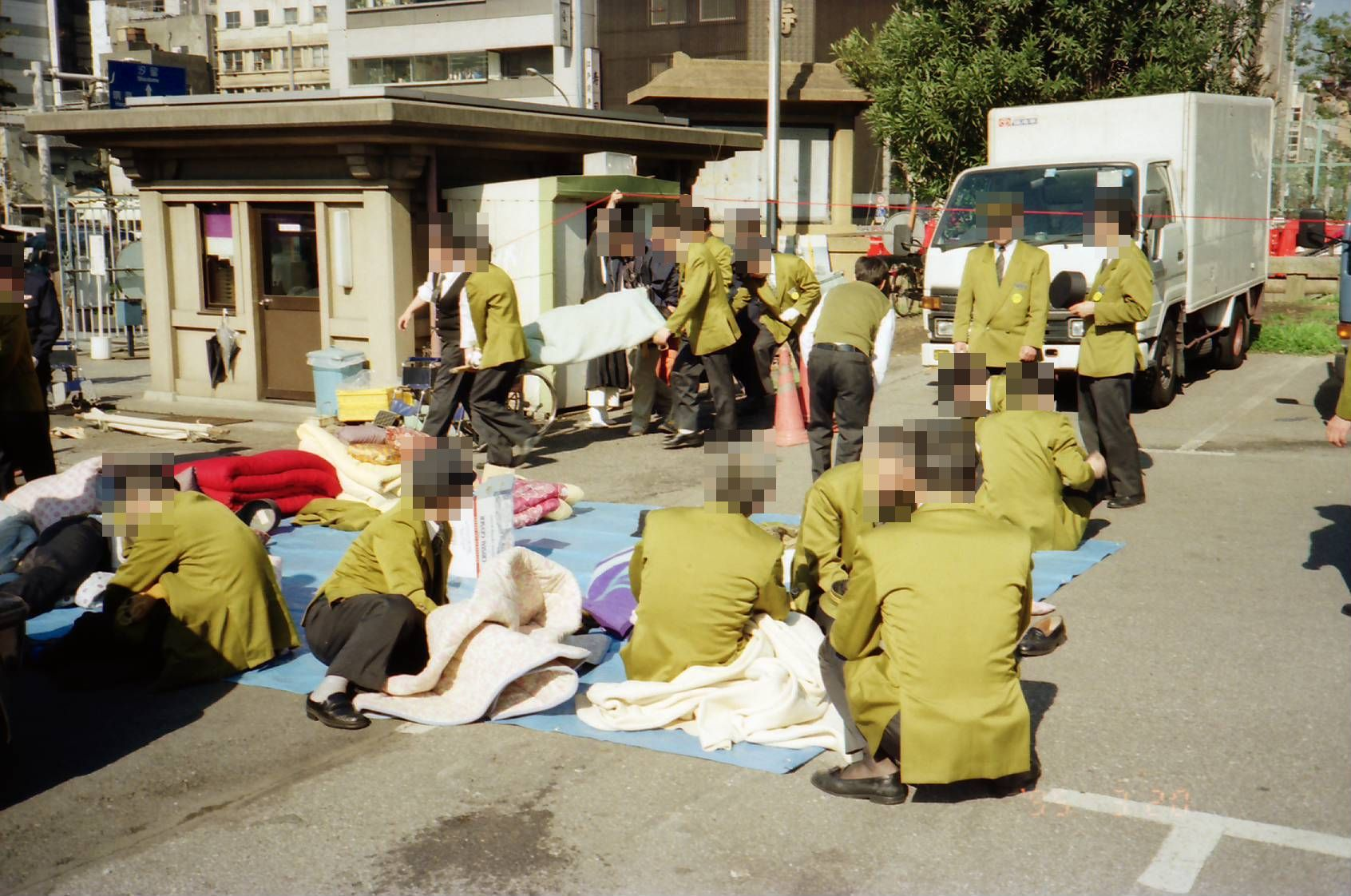
Subway workers injured by sarin gas in the Tsukiji Station.

On the day of the attack, ambulances transported 688 patients, and nearly 5,000 people reached hospitals by other means. In total, 278 hospitals saw 5,510 patients – 17 of whom were deemed critical, 37 severe, and 984 moderately ill with vision problems. About 85% of those reporting to hospitals were the "worried well", or psychogenic patients, who had to be distinguished from those who had physical symptoms.

The triage categorization was that a moderate casualty just had miosis (excessive constriction of the pupil). A severe casualty was short of breath or had muscular twitching or gastrointestinal problems as well as miosis. A severe or critical casualty required intensive care unit care. Several of those affected by sarin went to work in spite of their symptoms, not realizing that they had been exposed to sarin. Most of the victims sought medical treatment as the symptoms worsened and as they learned of the actual circumstances of the attacks via news broadcasts.

By mid-afternoon, over 500 mildly affected victims had recovered from vision problems and were released from the hospital. Most of the remaining patients were well enough to go home the following day. Within a week only a few critical patients remained in hospital. The death toll on the day of the attack was eight, with four more dying later. Hospitals became aware that sarin was involved after about two hours, and then started administering 2-PAM and atropine.

Several of those affected were exposed to sarin via helping those who had been directly exposed. Among these were passengers on other trains, subway workers and health care workers.

A 2008 law authorized payments of damages to victims of the gas attack, because the attack was aimed at the government of Japan. As of December 2009, 5,259 people had applied for benefits under the law. Of those, 47 out of 70 were certified as disabled and 1,077 of 1,163 applications for serious injuries or illnesses were certified.

Surveys of the victims in 1998 and 2001 showed that many were still suffering from post-traumatic stress disorder. In one survey 20% of 837 respondents complained that they felt insecure when on a train, while 10% answered that they tried to avoid any nerve-attack related news. Over 60% reported chronic eyestrain and said their vision had worsened.

Until 2008, 12 fatalities resulting from the attack had been officially acknowledged. However, in 2008 a survey of victims was conducted by the prefectural police department for the purpose of allocating compensation. This survey determined that a man who had died the day after the attack had also been killed by sarin inhalation, thereby increasing the officially recognised death toll to 13. On 10 March 2020, another victim, who had been bedridden for 25 years since the attack, died. 56-year-old Sachiko Asakawa's cause of death was determined to be hypoxic encephalopathy caused by sarin poisoning. She is considered the attack's 14th fatality.

=== Emergency services ===
At the Tokyo Metropolitan Police Department (TMPD), the Operations Center of the Criminal Investigation Bureau received the first report at 8:10 a.m.: "There appears to be an explosion in the subway yard." Because of this initial misinformation, more than 30 police officers, including police captains attempting to take command, inadvertently entered the crime scene and were harmed by the sarin gas.

The Forensic Science Laboratory had been gathering information on sarin based on lessons learned from the Matsumoto sarin attack, and by 10:30 a.m., they had discovered that the causative agent was sarin. In the hospitals, treatment was initiated even earlier than the laboratory report came in, assuming nerve agents.

Dr. Nobuo Yanagisawa, the Director of Shinshu University Hospital and experienced with treating sarin poisoning after the Matsumoto attack, shared information with hospitals in Tokyo that were accepting victims. St. Luke's International Hospital, the hospital that had received the largest number of victims, had already begun treatment with the assumption of nerve agents, and after receiving a call from Dr. Yanagisawa at 10:15 a.m., they thought it was more likely to be sarin. After completing the call with St. Luke's Hospital, Dr. Yanagisawa faxed his report on the Matsumoto attack to major hospitals in Tokyo.

A medical team from the Self-Defense Forces Central Hospital that had been dispatched to the Tokyo Metropolitan Police Hospital, arrived at St. Luke's Hospital at 10:30 a.m. Dr. Hikaru Aoki, a physician being part of this team, had brought with him materials from a course he had taken the day before on "Medicine Against Chemical Weapons,". This hospital was one of very few hospitals in Tokyo at that time to have the entire building wired and piped for conversion into a "field hospital" in the event of a major disaster. This proved fortunate, as the hospital was able to take in most of the 600+ victims at Tsukiji Station, resulting in no fatalities at that station.

As there was a severe shortage of antidotes in Tokyo, sarin antidote stored in rural hospitals as an antidote for herbicide/insecticide poisoning was delivered to nearby Shinkansen stations, where it was collected by the workers of Suzuken, a drug wholesaling company, on a train bound for Tokyo. An Osaka company that manufactured 2-PAM rushed emergency supplies to Tokyo unsolicited on hearing the news.

The National Police Agency (NPA) and TMPD had already been preparing for a mandatory investigation of the Aum cult as a danger, and based on the lessons learned from the Matsumoto attack, had procured chemical protective clothing from its own budget and sent riot specialists and detectives to JGSDF Chemical School to receive training in dealing with sarin gas. Since these police officers had only basic training and could not handle a large-scale terrorism attack of this magnitude, the TMPD recognized the need to immediately request assistance from the JGSDF. At 12:50 a.m., Yukio Aoshima, the Governor of Tokyo, issued a disaster relief request to the JGSDF 1st Division. The division's 32nd Infantry Regiment and Chemical Protection Platoon, along with a chemical protection platoon from the 12th Division, the 101st Chemical Protection Unit from the Eastern Army, and instructors from the Chemical School, were dispatched to decontaminate contaminated stations and vehicles.

As stated above, the Japanese police had already been planning a mandatory investigation into the Aum Shinrikyo cult, but following this sarin attack, the scale of the investigation was significantly expanded. The TMPD's riot police and reinforcements from neighbouring prefectural police headquarters (PPH) were dispatched, mobilising a total of 1,800 riot police officers. This represented the largest-scale investigation of a single criminal case in Japanese history.

On 21 March, the day before the mandatory investigation, a joint meeting was held between the National Police Agency, the Defense Agency, and the JGSDF. The JGSDF provided specialist expertise to the police while simultaneously commencing its own preparations in case police units were repelled by Aum. Aum possessed a Mil Mi-17 and unmanned crop-dusting helicopters, raising fears that these could be used to disperse sarin from the air.

The JGSDF devised an operation whereby electronic warfare units would jam the radio control of the UAVs while AH-1S attack helicopters intercepted them in the air. Tank units and anti-aircraft artillery units were to be deployed to support the police forces. Immediately prior to the police unit's entry, an OH-6D reconnaissance helicopter flew over the Aum facility to assess the potential damage area should sarin be dispersed. In the early morning of 22 March, police forces led by the Metropolitan Police Department's Seventh Riot Police Unit commenced a mandatory investigation of the Aum Shinrikyo facility in Kamikuishiki, Yamanashi.

Contrary to the fears of the police and the JGSDF, Aum Shinrikyo only protested with unarmed followers and no resistance was offered with weapons. The cult's founder Shoko Asahara, senior members of the organisation, and scientists involved in sarin production had all fled, and at this point, none could be arrested. This mandatory investigation had originally been planned as a rescue operation for a man who had been abducted while attempting to shelter his sister who had escaped the cult. It was later discovered he had already been killed.

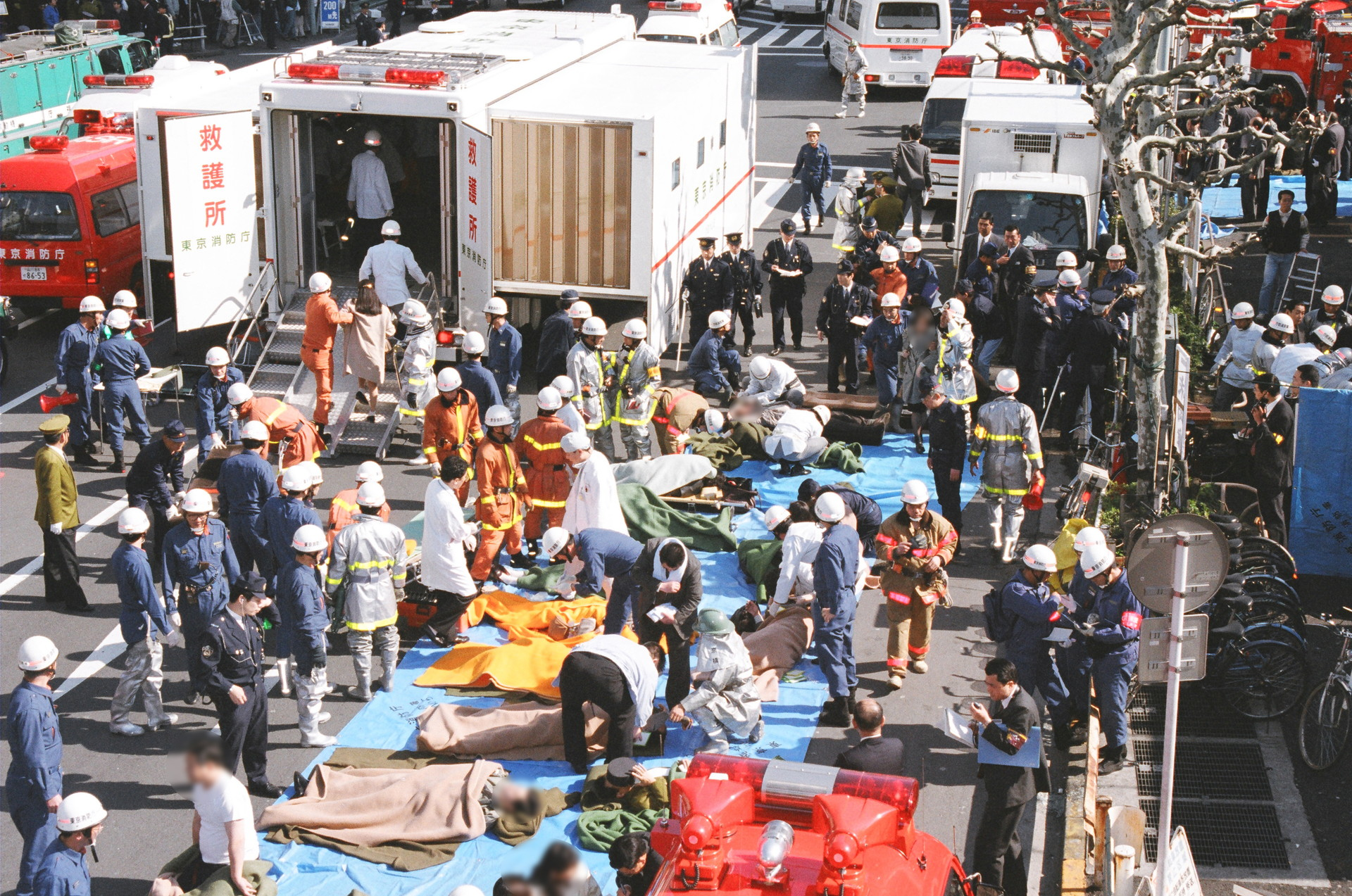
Large-scale rescue operations with an expandable special ambulance deployed.

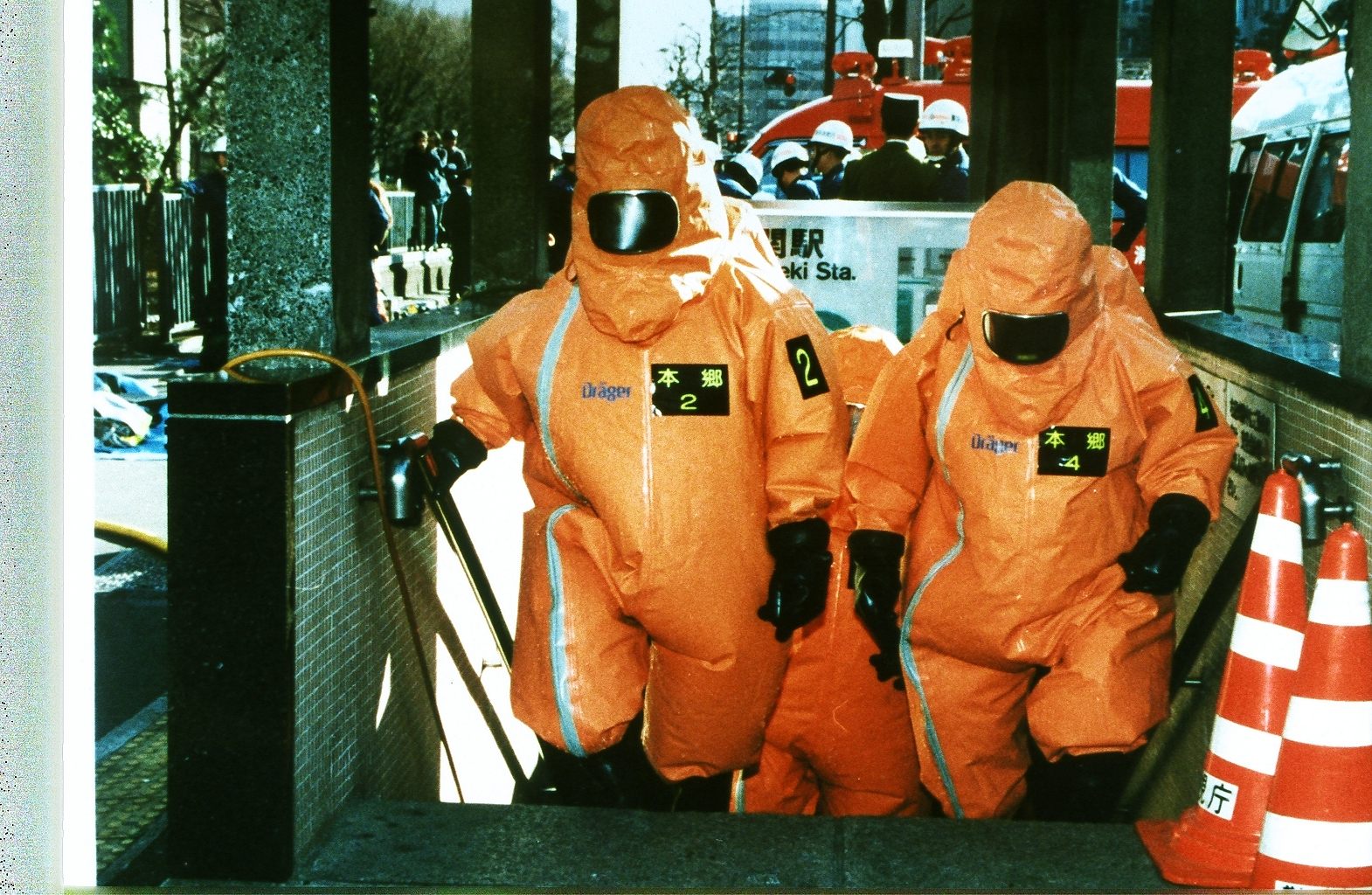
TFD firefighters operating inside Kasumigaseki Station with chemical protective clothing.

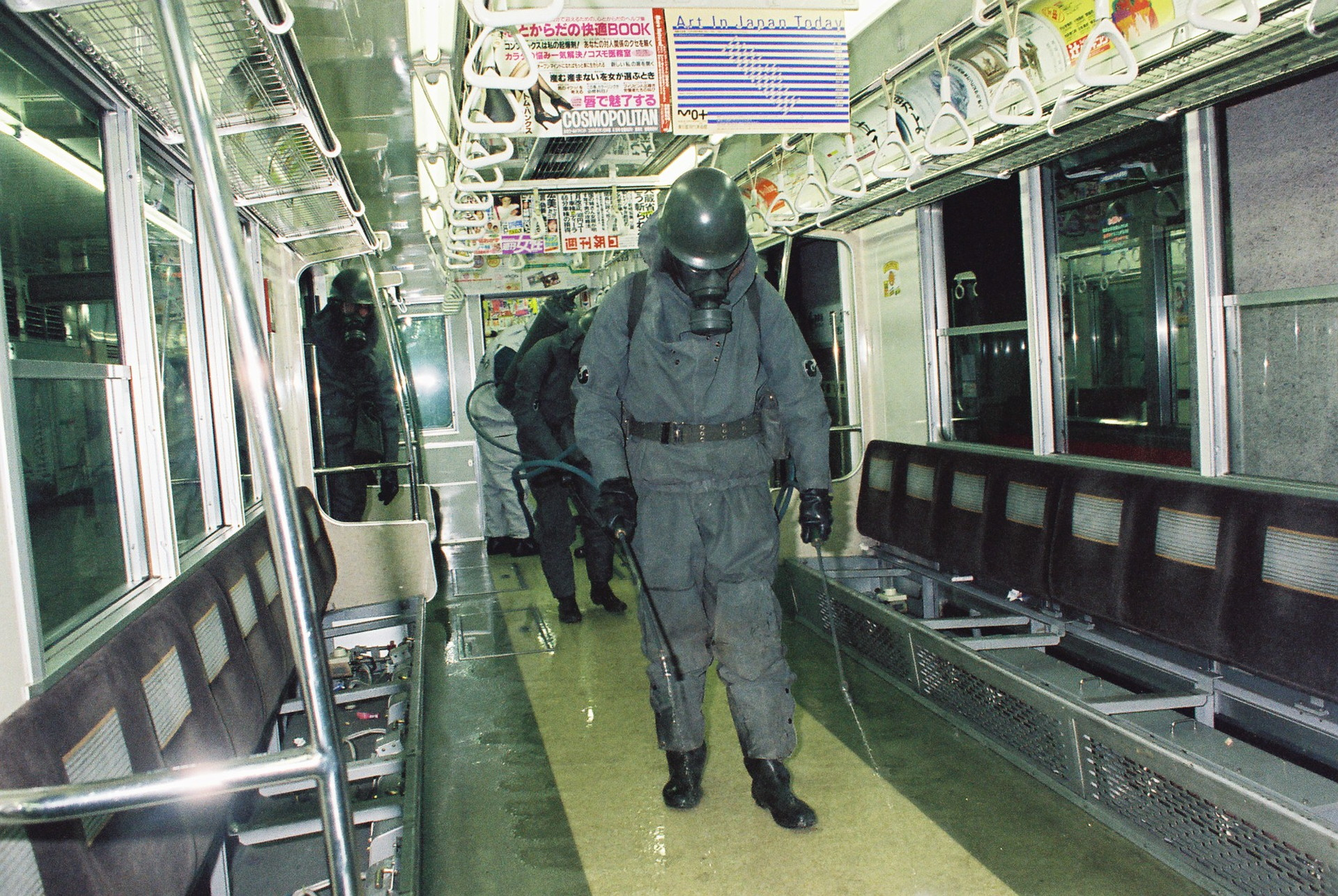
GSDF personnel spraying decontaminant inside contaminated vehicles.

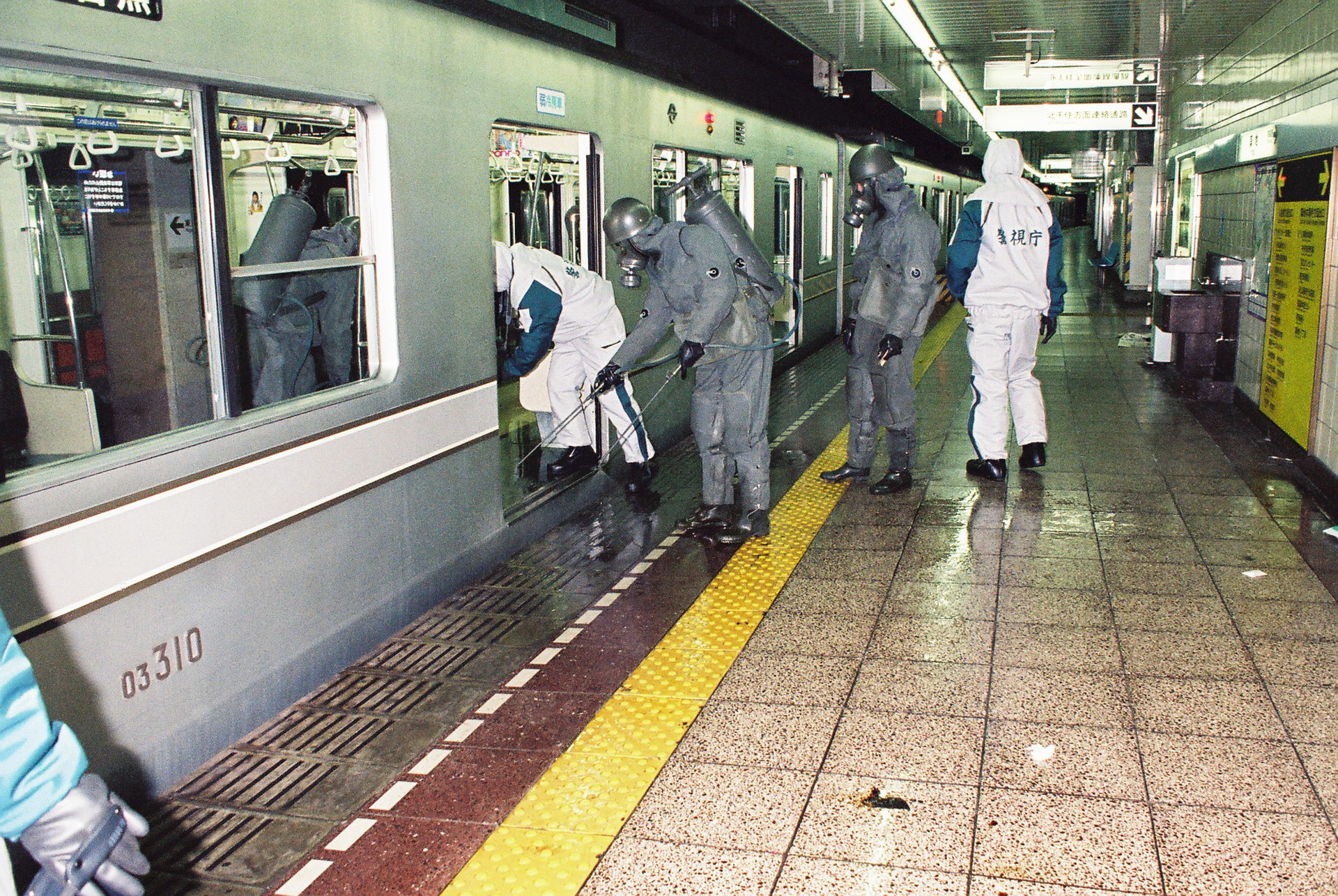
GSDF personnel (with olive-drab colored clothing) and Tokyo Metropolitan Police Department officers (with white clothing) entering contaminated vehicles.

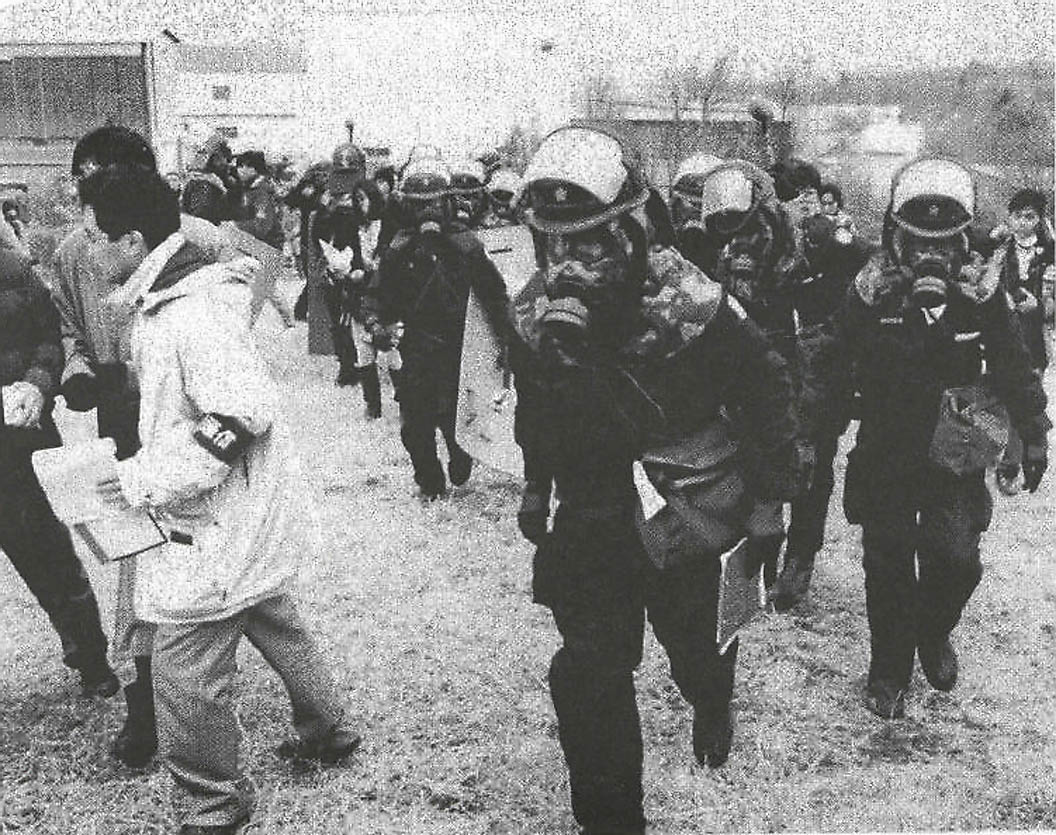
Police officers on their way to enforce a raid on Aum facilities after the attack.

=== Defense offered by Japanese and American scholars ===
Aum had carefully cultivated the friendship of Japanese scholars of religion. After the sarin gas attack, some of them, including Shimada Hiromi, a professor at Tokyo's Japan Women's University, suggested Aum might be innocent. Shimada later apologized, claiming he had been deceived by Aum, but his and others' statements damaged the public image of scholars of religion in general in Japan. Shimada later had to resign from his academic position.

In May 1995, Aum contacted an American group known as AWARE (Association of World Academics for Religious Education), founded by American scholar James R. Lewis, claiming that the human rights of its members were being violated. Lewis recruited human rights lawyer Barry Fisher, scholar of religion J. Gordon Melton, and chemical expert Thomas Banigan. They flew to Japan, with their travel expenses paid by Aum, and announced that they would investigate and report through press conferences at the end of their trip.

In the press conferences, Fisher and Lewis announced that Aum could not have produced the sarin with which the attacks had been committed. They had determined this, Lewis said, with their technical expert, based on photos and documents provided by the group.

However, the Japanese police had already discovered a sophisticated chemical weapons laboratory at Aum's main compound in March. The facility was capable of producing thousands of kilograms of sarin a year, far in excess of what was used. Later investigation showed that Aum had created the sarin used in the subway attacks, and had committed previous chemical and biological weapons attacks, including a previous attack with sarin that killed eight people and injured 144.

British scholar of Japanese religions Ian Reader, in a detailed account of the incident, reported that Melton "had few doubts by the end of his visit to Japan of Aum's complicity" and eventually "concluded that Aum had in fact been involved in the attack and other crimes" In fact, the Washington Post account of the final press conference mentioned Lewis and Fisher but not Melton. A Christian anti-cult website called Apologetic Index quoted the Washington Post article and implied that Melton had spoken in the press conference. Melton was not mentioned in the original Washington Post article.

Lewis maintained his opinion that Aum had been framed, and wrote that having the trip funded by Aum had been arranged "so that financial considerations would not be attached to our final report".

Reader concluded that, "The visit was well-intentioned, and the participants were genuinely concerned about possible violations of civil rights in the wake of the extensive police investigations and detentions of followers." However, it was ill-fated and detrimental to the reputation of those involved. While distinguishing between Lewis' and Melton's attitudes, Reader observed that Melton was criticized as well by both Japanese media and some fellow scholars. Using stronger words, Canadian scholar Stephen A. Kent chastised both Lewis and Melton for having put the reputation of the whole category of scholars of new religious movements at risk.

=== Murakami book ===
Popular contemporary novelist Haruki Murakami wrote Underground: The Tokyo Gas Attack and the Japanese Psyche (1997). He was critical of the Japanese media for focusing on the sensational profiles of the attackers and ignoring the lives of the victimized average citizens. The book contains extensive interviews with the survivors, telling their stories. Murakami later added a second part to the work, The Place That Was Promised. The additional section consists of a series of interviews with present and former Aum Shinrikyo members, first published in Bungei Shunjū.

=== Removal of public rubbish bins ===
The 1995 attack contributed to rubbish bins being permanently removed from most public spaces across Japan. The rationale being that the bins could potentially facilitate a terror attack. Today, residents and tourists have to take their rubbish to hotels, convenience stores, certain restaurants, or home.

=== Aum/Aleph today ===
Shoko Asahara's death warrant

The sarin attack was the most serious attack upon Japan since World War II. Shortly after the attack, Aum lost its status as a religious organization, and many of its assets were seized. The Diet (Japanese parliament) rejected a request from government officials to outlaw the group. The National Public Safety Commission received increased funding to monitor the group. In 1999, the Diet gave the commission broad powers to monitor and curtail the activities of groups that have been involved in "indiscriminate mass murder" and whose leaders are "holding strong sway over their members", a bill custom-tailored to Aum Shinrikyo.

Asahara was sentenced to death by hanging on 27 February 2004. Lawyers immediately appealed the ruling. The Tokyo High Court postponed its decision on the appeal until results were obtained from a court-ordered psychiatric evaluation to determine whether Asahara was fit to stand trial. In February 2006, the court ruled that Asahara was fit to stand trial, and on 27 March 2006, rejected the appeal against his death sentence. Japan's Supreme Court upheld this decision on 15 September 2006.

Two re-trial appeals were declined by the appellate court. In June 2012, Asahara's execution was postponed due to the further arrests of the two remaining Aum Shinrikyo members wanted in connection with the attack. Japan does not announce dates of executions, which are by hanging, in advance of them being carried out. On 6 July 2018, the Ministry of Justice announced that Asahara had been executed that morning, with six others of those principally involved.

On 27 November 2004, all the Aum trials concluded, excluding Asahara's, as the death sentence of Seiichi Endo was upheld by Japan's Supreme Court. As a result, among a total of 189 members indicted, 13 were sentenced to death, five were sentenced to life in prison, 80 were given prison sentences of various lengths, 87 received suspended sentences, two were fined, and one was found not guilty.

In May and June 2012, the last two of the fugitives wanted in connection with the attack were arrested in the Tokyo and Kanagawa area. One of them, Katsuya Takahashi, was taken into custody by police near a comic book cafe in Tokyo.

The group reportedly still has about 2,100 members, and continues to recruit new members under the name "Aleph", among others. Though the group has renounced its violent past, it still continues to follow Asahara's spiritual teachings. Members operate several businesses. Consumer boycotts of known Aleph-related businesses, police searches, confiscations of possible evidence and picketing by protest groups, have resulted in closures.

== In popular culture ==
- The movie Distance (2001 film) directed by Hirokazu Kore-eda deals with the aftermath of the attacks, focusing on the families who lost their loved ones.
- The 1995 video game The Story of Kamikuishiki Village satirizes the attack and Aum Shinrikyo as a whole, mocking its members and showcasing "humiliating" news coverage of the event.

== See also ==
- A, a documentary film made following the arrest of the leaders of Aum Shinrikyo
- Banjawarn Station, a cattle station in Western Australia owned by Aum Shinrikyo
- Capital punishment in Japan
- List of executions in Japan
- Me and the Cult Leader
- 2003 Daegu subway attack
- Religion in Japan
- List of terrorist incidents in 1995
