= Chemical protective clothing =

Clothing used to protect against chemical hazards

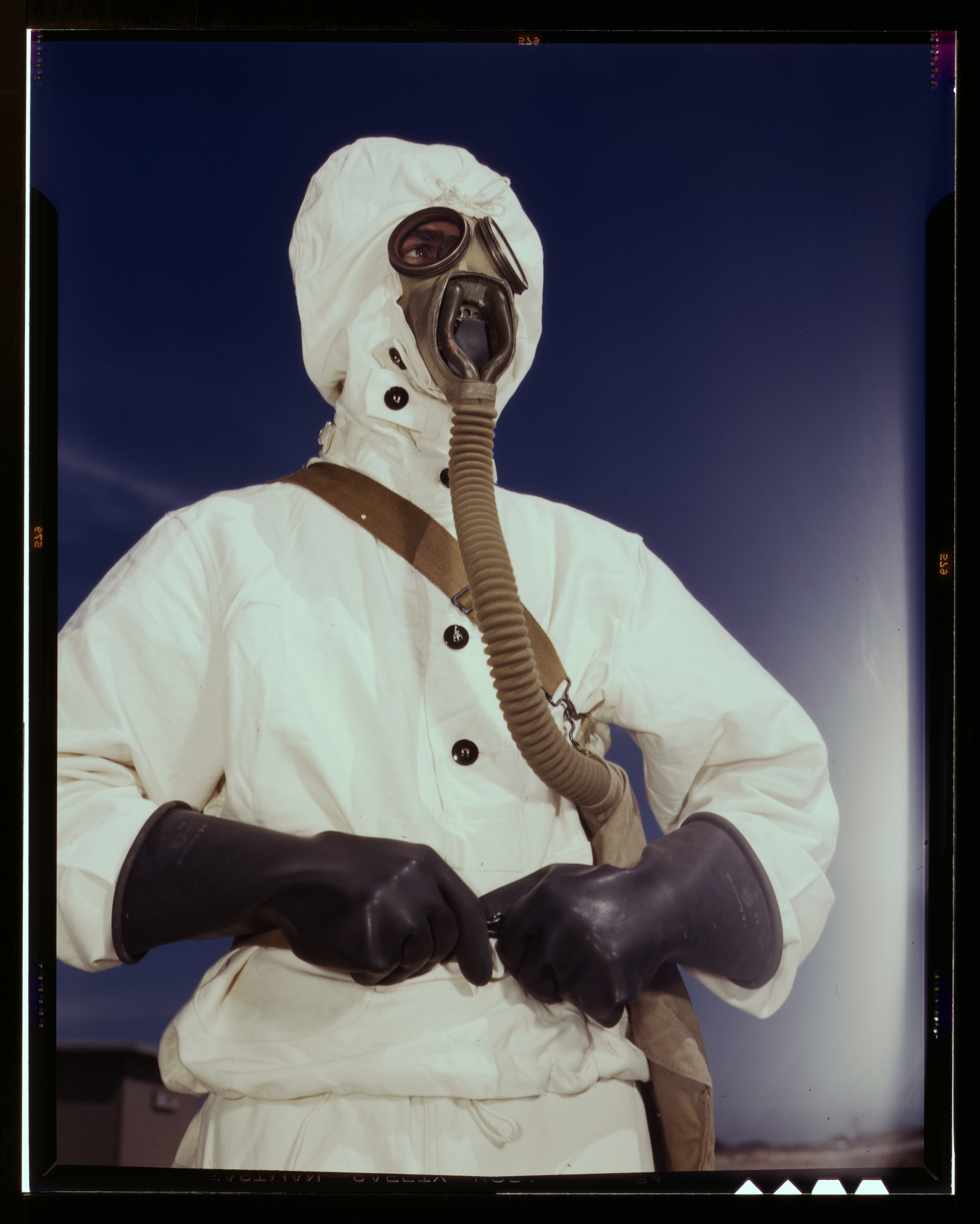
Chemical warfare protective clothing

Chemical Protective Clothing (CPC) is specialized equipment designed to prevent hazardous chemicals from coming into direct contact with the wearer. Used in chemical, physical, and biological operations as a last line of defense if safety controls fail. They are made of a variety of materials that are selected for their ability to prevent chemical penetration, permeation, and degradation.

== Clothing selection factors ==
There are some considerations with chemical protective clothing. For instance, no clothing is "impervious," since all clothing will eventually seep in chemicals. CPC also prevents evaporation, causing skin temperature to increase and potentially increasing the permeability of skin. CPC that has not been tested for the specific operating condition it is used in may not provide adequate protection. The same material, even at the same thickness, may provide different levels of protection depending on the manufacturer, since different manufacturers use different processes and may add different additives. Finally, while the test data will provide information on individual chemicals based on "worst-case scenario" continuous contact testing, most industrial exposures are not continuous and are in fact mixtures of chemical, for which permeation rates are different.

When selecting Chemical Protective Clothing, there are several factors that must be taken into account prior to selecting the garments that are needed. A risk assessment is often conducted to assist with making sure that the right protective clothing is selected. When selecting the appropriate chemical protective clothing, it is recommended to determine:

- The chemicals being used and their hazards
- The state of those chemicals; for example, if they are vaporous, they could be more hazardous
- Whether contact is a result of occasional splashing or a result of more continuous contact
- Whether the worker can be exposed from handling contaminated CPC
- Environmental Conditions (Weather, location)
- Duration the worker will be wearing the protective clothing
- The room temperature where the chemical is being handled
- The parts of the body that the chemical could potentially contact
- Whether the CPC resists physical wear and tear commensurate with the type of work being done
- Whether the CPC interferes with the work, for instance by limiting dexterity

From there, it is recommended that candidate garments should be selected and subject to appropriate testing. Testing is also considered necessary to make sure the material is suitable to the specific condition it will be used in, as opposed to the generic, worst-case scenarios it ordinarily undergoes. Once a garment is selected, it should undergo a limited evaluation with worker training. Once the garment is regularly used it should be regularly evaluated.

== Clothing ensemble ==
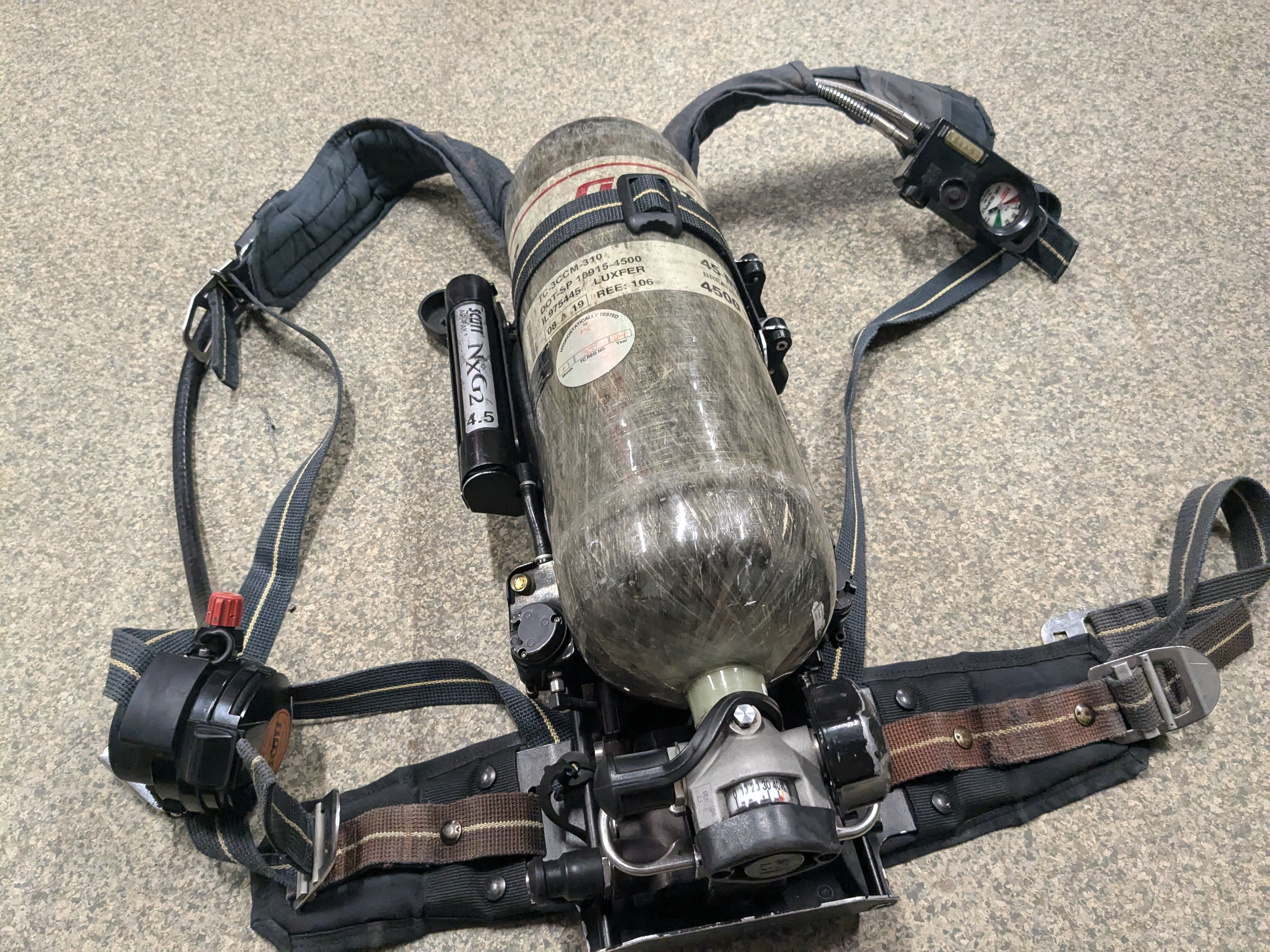
A self Contained Breathing Apparatus designed to contain thirty minutes of oxygen

Chemical Protective Clothing ensembles are not a one size fits all approach. The level of protection needed and the hazards that are associated with the chemical will play a major role in what pieces of the ensemble are needed to fully protect the worker. When purchasing Chemical Protective Clothing, careful consideration should be taken to make sure that all pieces of the ensemble are compatible with each other. Pieces of the ensemble may include:

- Protective Suit (Fully Encapsulating, Splash Suit)
- Respiratory Protection (Self Contained Breathing Apparatus, Respirator)
- Head Protection (Helmet)
- Hearing Protection (Ear Plugs)
- Eye Protection (Safety Goggles / Face Shield)
- Gloves (Inner and Outer)
- Boots
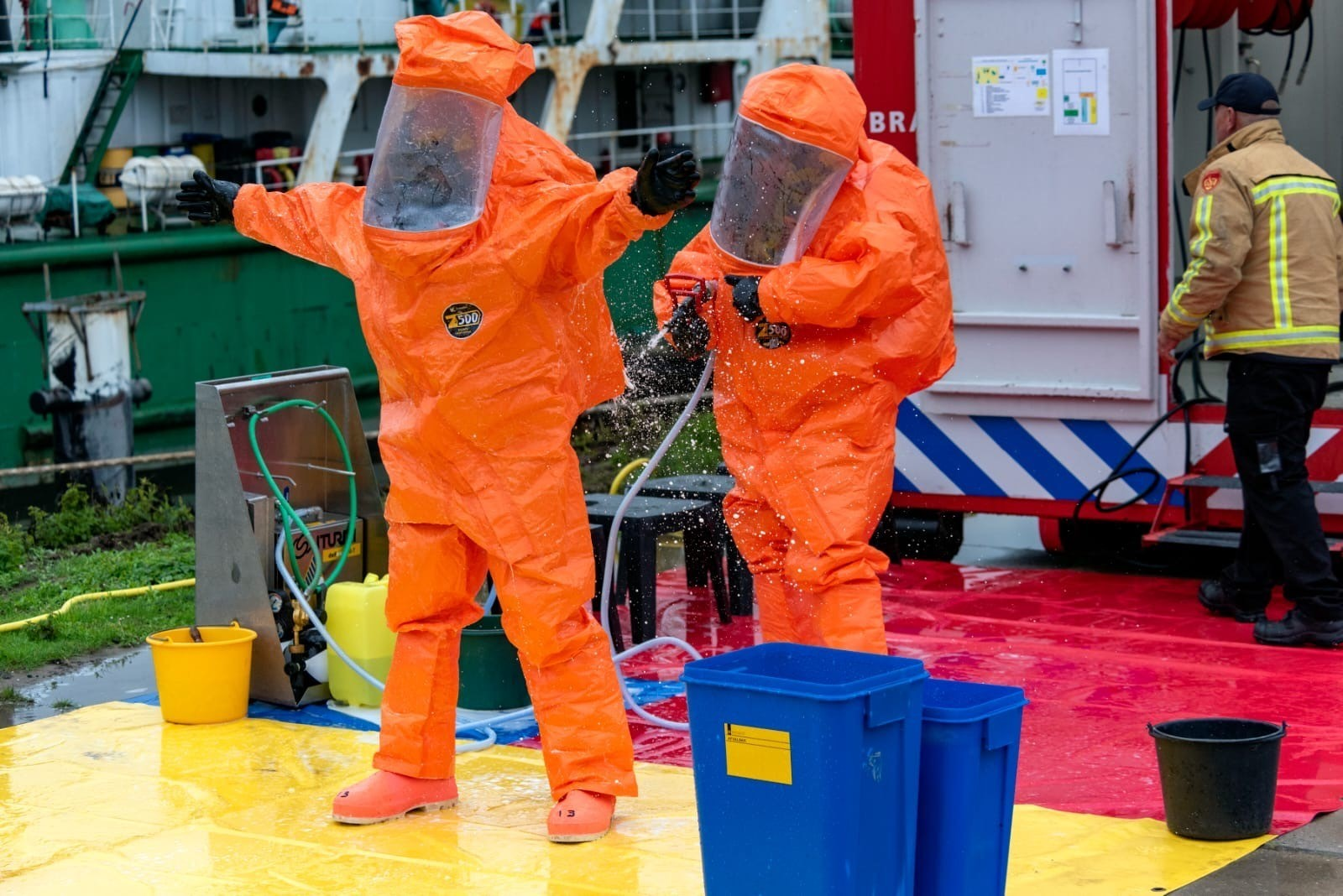
  Level A Fully Encapsulating Suit

== Materials ==
Not all CPC is made for the same purpose. Sometimes there is material that is more suitable for the given task. Each material provides varying resistance to chemicals, strength, and heat resistance. Many companies have their own recipe for their products that blend the use of rubbers, plastics, composites, and metals. In order to ensure the product is suitable for the intended use it is important to consult the manufacturer.

The standards for protective equipment are determined by the chemicals being handled. Not all materials used to produce CPC are compatible with every substance. In the event an incompatible material comes into contact with the chemical, it could react, resulting in serious injury or death.

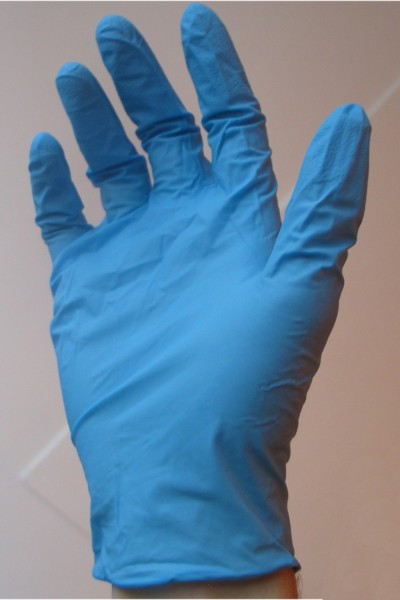
Nitrile glove commonly used to protect from chemical and biohazards

Common Materials:

- Rubber
  - Butyl - synthetic material resistant to vapor and gas permeation but is incompatible with oxidizing agents, strong bases and liquid oxygen
  - Neoprene - synthetic material with good tensile strength and high heat resistance. Incompatible with strong acids, chlorine, and acetone
  - Nitrile - Synthetic material with great chemical and abrasion resistance
  - Viton - Excellent chemical resistance, but is incompatible with strong bases and ketones. Is flexible but poor cut and abrasion resistance
- Plastics
  - PVC (Polyvinyl Chloride) - Thermoplastic that provides good chemical and abrasion resistance. Incompatible with acetone, bromide, chloroform, and sulfuric acid
  - PVA (Polyvinyl Alcohol) - Water soluble but impermeable to gases. Has excellent chemical resistance but can’t be used in water based solutions or it will melt
- Composites
  - Aramid Fibers - Cut resistant, heat resistant, and provides some protection from projectiles
  - Carbon Fiber reinforced polymers (ex. Kevlar) - Very-high temperature and impact resistance. Good chemical resistance
- Metals
  - Nanoparticles of metals like Nickel, silver, gold, palladium, and copper are infused into the clothing or protective gear to improve properties such as heat dispersion and the decomposition of toxic substances.

== Levels of protection ==
The EPA categorizes Chemical Protective Clothing into four levels, with Level A being the highest level of protection and Level D being the lowest level of protection. These levels are based on the amount of protection for the user’s skin and respiratory protection.

- Level A – The highest level of both respiratory and skin protection. Consists of a full encapsulating suit that is vapor tight with respiratory protection consisting of either Self Contained Breathing Apparatus (SCBA) or supplied air respirator. Used when protection from vapor and liquid is needed. Ensemble may also consist of internal radio communication, head protection, boots, and gloves. (ex. First responder approaching unknown toxic gas leak)
- Level B – The highest level of respiratory protection with reduced skin protection. Consists of chemical resistant clothing that may or may not be fully encapsulating, paired with either a Self Contained Breathing Apparatus (SCBA) or supplied air respirator. Used when there is a reduced risk of vapor exposure but there are concerns with exposure to respiratory tract. Ensemble may also consist of radio communication, head protection, face shield, boots, and gloves. (ex. Cleaning a chemical spill where there is no risk of vapor inhalation)
- Level C – Reduced respiratory protection along with reduced skin protection. Consists of a liquid splash protection suit (coveralls) paired with an air purifying respirator. Used when there is reduced risk of skin exposure to chemicals but there are concerns with contaminants in the air. Ensemble may also consist of radio communication, head protection, face shield, boots, and gloves. (ex. Handling and applying pesticides)
- Level D – The lowest level of protection required. Can be used where there is no chance of chemical being splashed onto the worker and there are no contaminants that would harm the respiratory tract. Ensemble consist of standard work coveralls, face shield or safety glasses, gloves, and boots. (ex. working in a warehouse with sealed chemical containers)

== History ==
Protective workwear has been utilized for centuries, dating back to leather aprons and gloves used by blacksmiths in the middle ages and miners using helmets and rags to protect from debris. Since then there have been numerous advancements in technology and in understanding of germs, chemicals, and other hazards. As Industries grew workplace hazards became more recognized leading to the need of more standardized practices and equipment. With the passing of the Occupational Safety and Health Act of 1970 use of CPC has become mandatory in the United States resulting in more thorough regulations, more research, and more improvements.

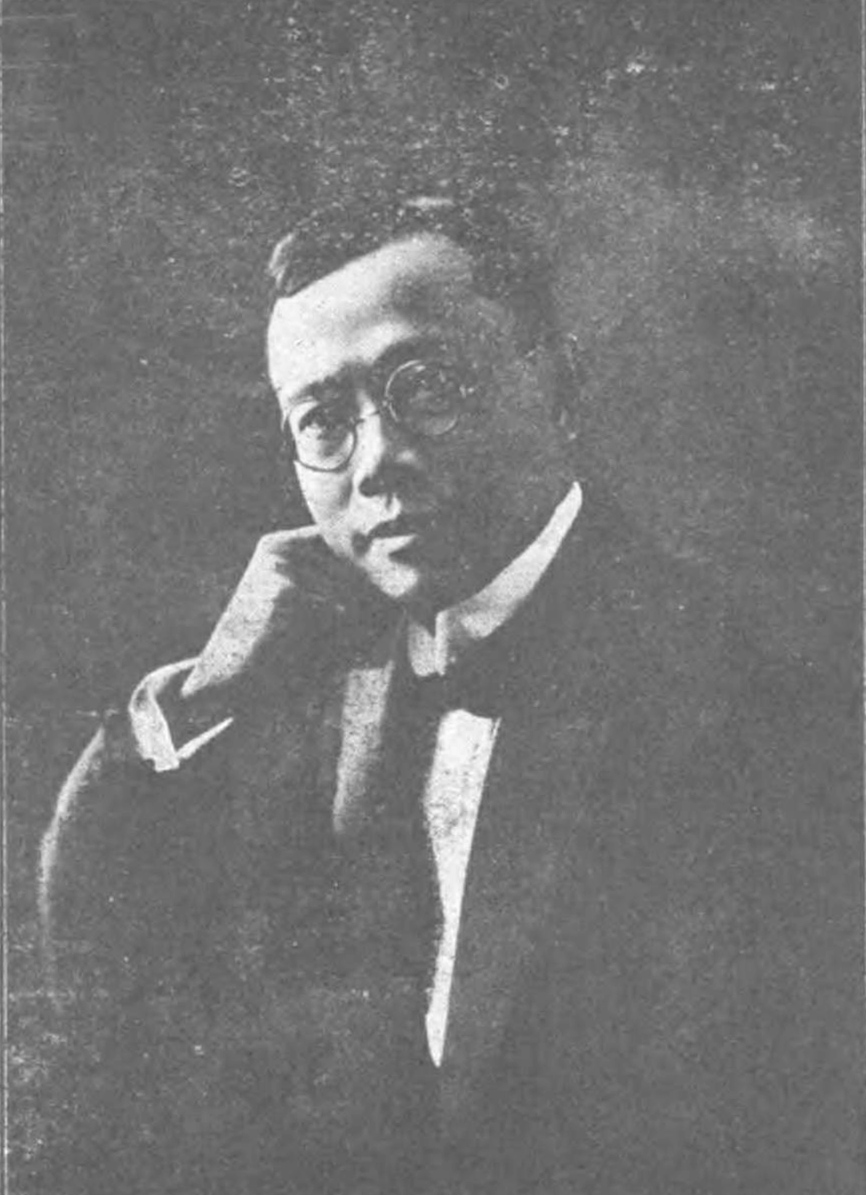
Dr. Wu Lien Teh in 1926

Historical moments:

- Manchurian plague epidemic of 1910-1911. Dr. Wu Lien Teh developed the first gauze mask
- WWI in (1914) Chemical warfare caused the rapid advancement in protective equipment
- The Modern Hard hat was designed in 1982
- Kevlar and Nomex Fibers were invented in 1982 allowing for lightweight protective equipment
- Rubber began being used in firefighter equipment in the 1930’s

== NFPA standards ==
Over the years, the roles and responsibilities of first responders has drastically changed. To protect the best interest of those first responders, standards have been developed to assist agencies with selecting the appropriate level of protection. These standards also ensure that the chemical protective clothing has been tested and certified to meet a minimum set of specifications. The standards not only cover the protective clothing suit, but also all other components such as respiratory protection, gloves, boots, and all other garments that complete the ensemble.

- NFPA 1991 standard covers the requirements for ensembles that offer the highest level of protection. These types of suits would be classified on the EPA scale as Level A suits. These types of suits are fully encapsulating and are air tight (vapor resistive).
- NFPA 1992 standard covers the requirements for ensembles that are liquid/splash protective. These types of suits would be classified on the EPA scale as Level B suits. These suits are resistive to liquids and are not rated for any type of vapor protection.
- NFPA 1994 standard is broken down into 4 classes. NFPA 1994 Class 1 and 2 are intended to protect the user in an environment that requires a self contained breathing apparatus and where vapors or liquids are expected to make contact with the users skin. These liquids or vapors may include those of chemical warfare, bloodborne pathogens, or industrial chemicals. NFPA 1994 Class 3 must also be rated to protect the user from the same potential exposures of Class 1 and 2, however these ensembles only require the use of air purifying respirator. NFPA 1994 Class 4 ensembles are rated to protect the user from bloodborne pathogens and biological agents and offer no protection against industrial chemicals or chemical warfare. Class 4 ensembles are rated to be used with an air purifying respirators as well.
- NFPA 1999 standard covers the requirements for ensembles that are single use or multi-use for protection against bloodborne pathogens or potential exposures to infectious diseases. These ensembles are rated to be used with an air purifying respirator.

== See also ==
- Chemical safety
- Personal protective equipment
