= Kogakuin University =

Private university in Tokyo, Japan

Coordinates: 35.690569°N 139.695402°E

- 工学院大学
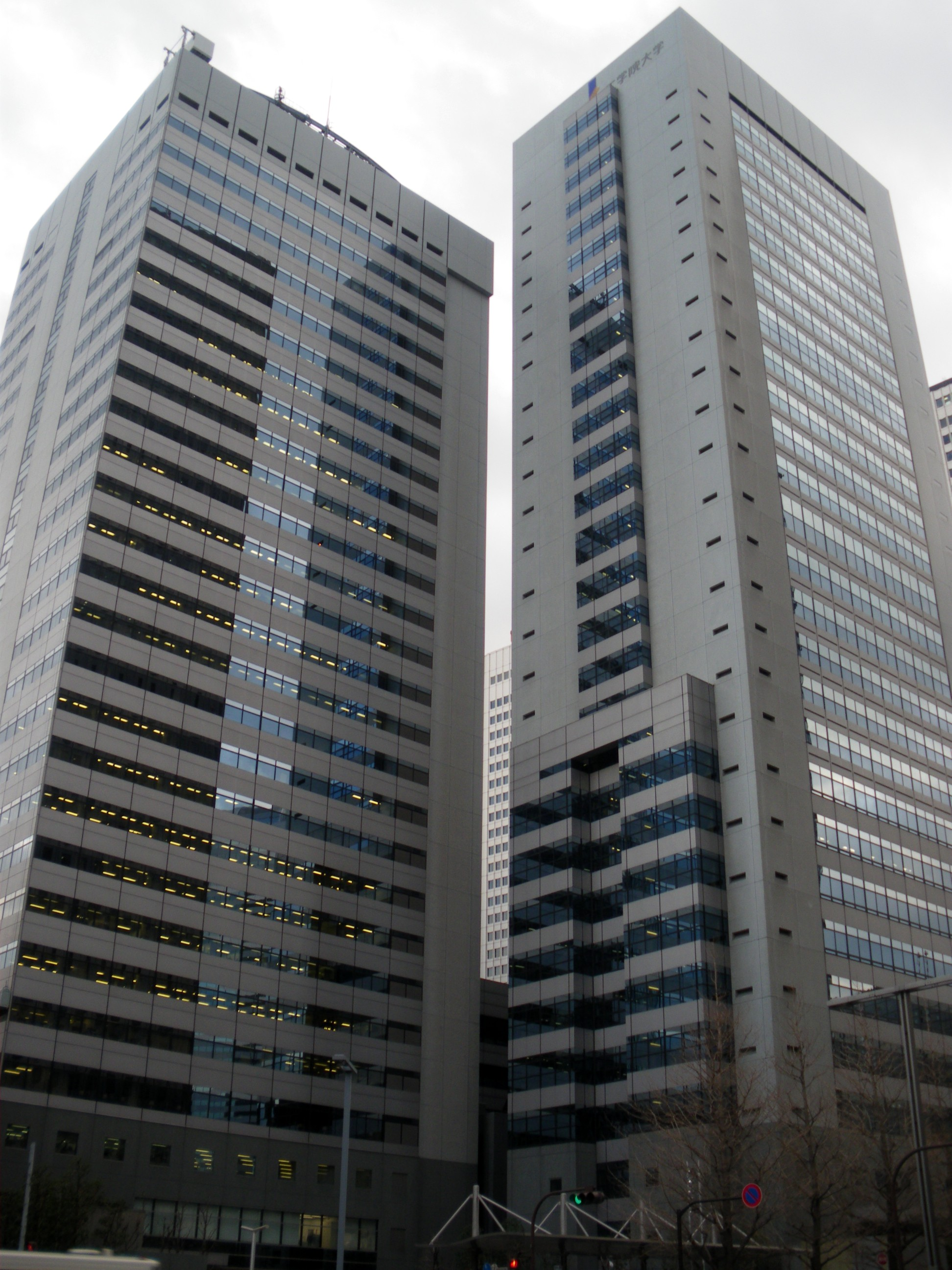
- Kogakuin University
- Established: 1887
- Location: Shinjuku, Tokyo, Japan
- Campus: Hachiōji, Tokyo
- Website: www.kogakuin.ac.jp/english

Kogakuin University (工学院大学, Kōgakuin daigaku) is a private university in Shinjuku, Tokyo, Japan. Its predecessor was named "Koshu Gakko" (工手学校) and was one of the oldest private engineering schools in Japan.

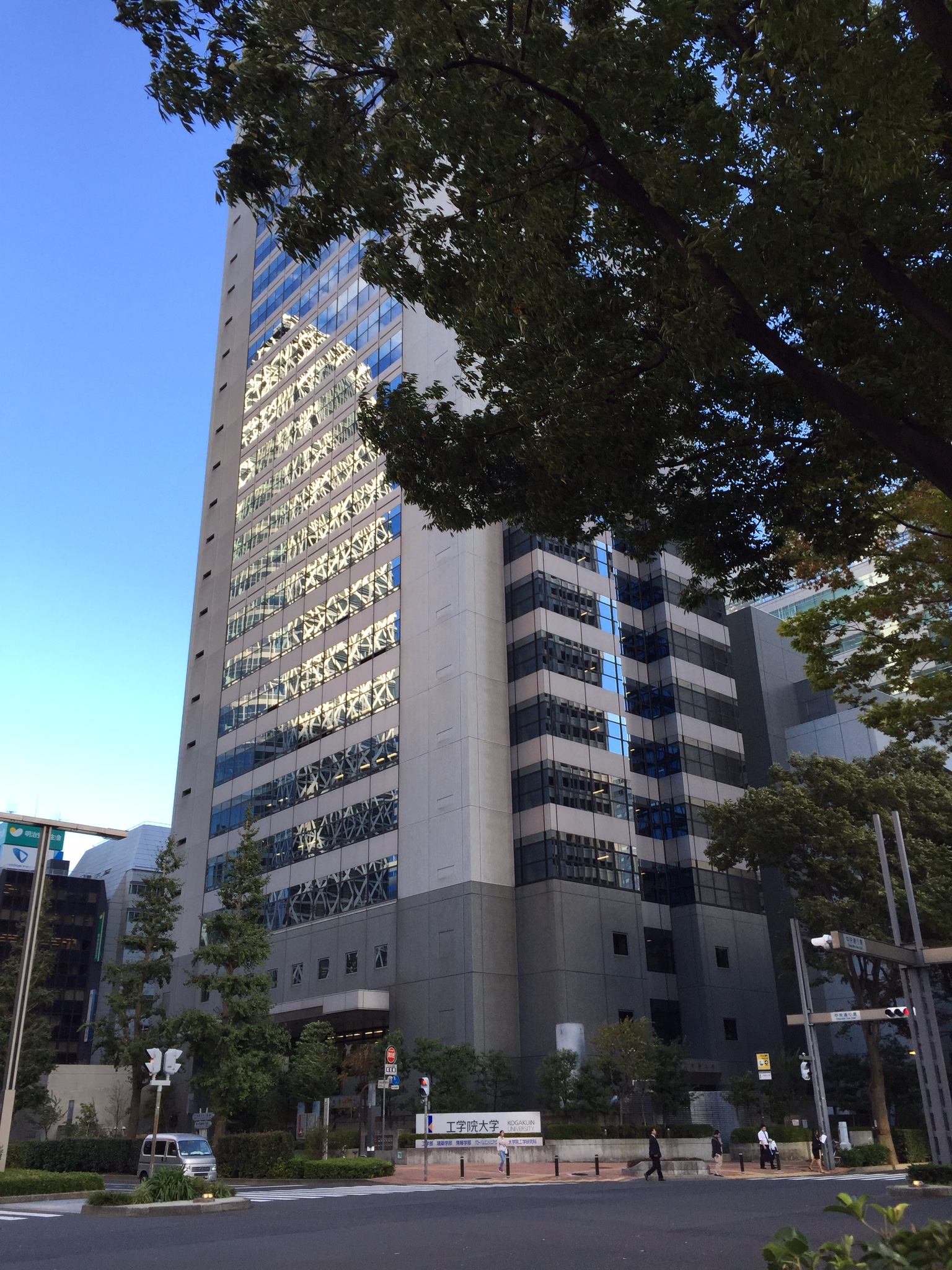
Shinjuku Campus

== History ==
Koshu Gakko (工手学校, lit. technicians school) was founded in 1887 by educator, politician, and president of Tokyo Imperial University, Koki Watanabe, president of Imperial College of Engineering, Furuichi Kōi and professors of Tokyo Imperial University including Tatsuno Kingo.

The Koshu Gakko was an evening school. It had civil, mechanical, electric, architecture, ship building, mining, metallurgical, and chemical engineering courses when it was established. In 1928, the school was renamed "Kogakuin" which means "Institute of Engineering" or "Institute of Technology" in Japanese.

In 1949, the school was chartered as a four-year university. In 1964, it had master's courses; in 1966 it had doctorate courses in the graduate school.
