= Ikuo Hayashi =

Japanese terrorist

- Born: January 23, 1947 (age 79); Shinagawa, Tokyo, Japan
- Occupation: former medical doctor
- Organization: Aum Shinrikyo
- Criminal charges: Murder; Terrorism; Kidnapping
- Criminal penalty: Life imprisonment
- Criminal status: Incarcerated

Ikuo Hayashi (林 郁夫, Hayashi Ikuo; born January 23, 1947) is a Japanese terrorist and former Aum Shinrikyo member convicted for his participation in the sarin gas attack on the Tokyo subway.

== Background ==
Prior to joining Aum, Hayashi was a senior medical doctor with "an active 'front-line' track record" at the Japanese Ministry of Science and Technology (now a part of the Ministry of Education, Culture, Sports, Science and Technology, or MEXT in short). Himself the son of a doctor, Hayashi graduated from Keio University, one of Tokyo's top universities. He was a heart and artery specialist at Keio University Hospital, which he left to become head of Circulatory Medicine at the National Sanitorium Hospital in Tokai, Ibaraki (north of Tokyo). Somewhere along the line Hayashi became disillusioned and decided to look beyond conventional medicine. He found AUM during his search.

In 1990 Hayashi resigned his job and left his family to join Aum and become a renunciate. He was believed to be one of Shoko Asahara's favorites and was appointed the group's "Minister of Health" with responsibilities encompassing a broad range of activities from development of a balanced "Aum diet" and supervision over "Aum hospital" to experimentations with the illegal psychedelic drug LSD (which reportedly was used in one of Aum's initiations sometime in 2002).

Besides involvement in Tokyo subway sarin gas attack and LSD drug affair, Hayashi was convicted in a number of other crimes. For example, he assisted in kidnapping of Kiyoshi Kariya, the 68-year-old brother of a 62-year-old woman who planned to become a renunciate but went missing (Hayashi believed she was held against her will by her brother to prevent her from becoming a nun). Hayashi and several other men injected Kariya with a drug to find the woman, but Kariya unexpectedly died, either from miscalculated dosage or weak physical health. Previously Hayashi helped another Aum member to recover from a forced drug treatment administered by the follower's father (also to prevent him from becoming a renunciate).

== Tokyo subway sarin attack ==
During the Tokyo sarin gas attack, Ikuo Hayashi and Tomomitsu Niimi were involved in delivering the sarin containers on the Chiyoda line as a part of the Tokyo sarin attacks. Niimi served as the driver. Hayashi, wearing a surgical mask of the type commonly worn by Japanese during cold and flu season, boarded the southwestbound 7:48 a.m. Chiyoda line train number A725K on the first car. He was about to puncture the sarin packs but had second thoughts due to seeing dozens of commuters and fearing that releasing the sarin would endanger their lives, he also thought of aborting the attack.

Hayashi punctured only one bag of sarin at the next stop, Shin-Ochanomizu Station in the central business district. Two transit authority staff in the subway were killed by the sarin, including the assistant station-master, and 231 suffered serious injuries. Both perpetrators did not attempt to hide and returned to Aum facilities.

Sometime after the news of the attack gained worldwide attention, Hayashi later surrendered to the Japan police wherein he provided details of the attack and its perpetrators to investigators and also included additional information about Aum activities post-attack. A huge raid of Aum facilities and arrest of Aum members were conducted.

== Trial and legal proceedings ==
In court, the two reacted differently. While Niimi refused to cooperate with prosecution saying that the "four meditative concentrations" he experienced under guidance of Asahara prevent him from testifying against his Guru, Hayashi accepted responsibility in the attack and testified in court. He was quoted as saying that he regrets that "while he became a doctor to help, he used his skills to inflict sufferings". He apologized to the victims and said that he views the death penalty as an appropriate punishment for his deeds. Niimi, citing different reasons (loyalty to Asahara and Buddhist fatalistic ideas), also said that he would "gladly" accept the capital punishment.

Hayashi was given a life sentence with a possibility of parole in 20 years, while Niimi was sentenced to death (and later executed in 2018). As of 2025, Hayashi remains imprisoned.
