= Yoshihiro Inoue =

Aum Shinrikyo member and murderer

- 井上嘉浩
- Born: December 28, 1969; Ukyō-ku, Kyoto, Japan
- Died: July 6, 2018 (aged 48); Osaka Detention House, Osaka, Japan
- Cause of death: Execution by hanging
- Known for: Tokyo subway sarin attack and other crimes related to membership of Aum Shinrikyo
- Status: Executed
- Convictions: Mass murder Terrorism
- Penalty: Death

Yoshihiro Inoue (井上嘉浩, Inoue Yoshihiro; December 28, 1969 – July 6, 2018) was a Japanese terrorist and high ranking member of the doomsday cult Aum Shinrikyo who was executed in Japan on July 6, 2018. He was responsible for coordinating the Tokyo subway sarin attack in 1995 which killed 14 people. His holy name was Aananda and his stage in the cult was Master Shogo.

== Biography ==
Inoue was born on December 28, 1969, in Ukyō-ku, Kyoto, Japan. During his childhood, he liked documentary programs and was interested in the problems of poverty and dog killing in the world. His father was a serious person, but he did not feel at home, and he and his wife often quarreled. His mother even attempted suicide once. After studying martial arts, yoga, and Agon Shu, in 1986, when he was a sophomore in high school, he attended the Aum Shinzen no Kai's Tanzawa Seminar. He was impressed by Shoko Asahara and felt that Asahara was like an ideal parent.

In February 1988, he appeared with Aum members in NHK's "Ohayo Journal" ("Mysterious" Young People in the Midst of Changing Religious Consciousness). In March of the same year, he graduated from the private Rakunan High School in Kyoto. Inoue wanted to be ordained immediately, but after negotiations between his parents and Asahara, his parents decided that he would be ordained after leaving university, and he used a recommendation to enter the Faculty of Law at Nippon Bunka University. He also worked as a delivery rider for "Aum's Bento Shop". Eventually, under Asahara's direction, he dropped out of college in the first semester of his freshman year and became a Buddhist priest, and his mother also became an Aum lay follower.

In 1989, he was certified by Asahara to have attained Kundalini Yoga and became a Grand Master. He was involved in the illegal line of Vajrayana since the time of the Ishigaki Island Seminar in 1990. It is said that he once learned wiretapping techniques from a private detective, Shigeharu Mukawa. He was involved in a series of Aum Shinrikyo cases, including the attack on a parking lot owner, the murder of a company employee, the attack on a victim's association president, the arrest and confinement death of the notary public's office manager, and the sarin gas attack on the subway. He was also involved in the Shinjuku Station cyanide gas incident and the Tokyo Metropolitan Government parcel bombing as the ringleader. He was promoted to the rank of Shogo Guru in a notice issued by the Venerable Master three days before the sarin gas attack.

He was specially wanted for the arrest and confinement death of the notary public's office manager. On May 15, 1995, he was questioned in Akikawa City (now Akiruno City) by a police car pursuing an Aum vehicle, and was taken to the Gokaichi Police Station for a fake driver's license. The interrogator did not seem to know who he was, and was surprised when he honestly told him that his name was Inoue. After that, a policeman rushed in and deliberately bumped into Inoue, interfering with his fall, and arrested him.

In the car in which he was riding, a substance that was used as a raw material for explosives in the Tokyo Metropolitan Government parcel bombing and the bombing of Shimada Yumi's house was discovered.

On December 26, 1995, he sent a message to Samana and his congregation urging them to leave Aum Shinrikyō. In the message, he stated that his body was still bound by the criminal acts he had committed in the name of the "Guru's Will," but that his mind was much freer than before. He also stated that the various notions he had cultivated in the cult were falling apart, that there was no need for a "final liberator" or "savior" if he wanted to attain awakening, that there was no need for a "Venerable Master," a "Righteous Master," a "Samana," or any other such rank, and that there was no need for any cult whatsoever.

== Trial ==
During the trial, he showed remorse for the Aum Affair, but he tended to trivialize and shift the blame by claiming that he was not heavily used, which raised questions about the credibility of his testimony. The public treated him as a traitor and he was bashed not only by Aum but also by critics and journalists, but his attitude did not change.

He was sentenced to life imprisonment by the Tokyo District Court on June 6, 2000, after pleading guilty to the charge of arrest and confinement but not to the charge of arrest and confinement manslaughter in the case of the Meguro Notary Public Office clerk, and remaining in a liaison role in the sarin gas attack. This was the first time in the Aum Shinrikyo case that a sentence of life imprisonment was handed down in response to a request for the death penalty.

However, the prosecutor appealed. Moreover, Tomomitsu Niimi also began to testify that Inoue was in a very important position in the sarin gas incident, and that he was happy immediately after the bombing of Shimada Yumi's house, saying, "I did it!" Even before this, Yoshihiro Ida, Inoue's subordinate and driver, testified that Inoue found Sakamoto Tsutsumi "stupid" and "poached the whole family because it was bad karma," and that he found the victim of the pharmacist lynching and murder case "very dirty" and "very decisive" and interesting, and Seiichi Endo testified that "Inoue lies a lot" and that "Asahara told me that Ananda deceives even the god of death." Inoue's position as the spearhead in the pursuit of Asahara was shaky.

On May 28, 2004, the Tokyo High Court upheld his conviction for the arrest and confinement manslaughter in the Meguro notary public office case, and found that he played an important role in the indiscriminate mass murder of people as a general coordinator, although he was not the on-site commander of the sarin gas attack. On December 10, 2009, his appeal was dismissed, and on January 12, 2010, his motion to amend the judgment of the appellate court was dismissed. The death penalty was confirmed. This is the ninth person to be sentenced to death in the Aum Shinrikyo case. In the letter, Inoue wrote, "I am keenly aware once again that death is equal for all living things," and "Now is the time for me to live a life that sees the truth of life and death. If you have lived to be a hundred years old but have not seen the truth of life and death, you will not be able to live a day longer than those who have seen the truth of life and death."

== Death row ==
=== Notary Public's Office Manager murder ===
In 2011, after the death penalty was confirmed, Inoue sent a letter to the eldest son of the victim (office manager) in the case of the arrest and confinement death of the office manager of the notary office through a concerned person. The letter stated that the cause of the chief's death was a side effect of anesthesia, which was not true, and that Tomomasa Nakagawa (a doctor at the time) may have intentionally killed him. However, it was snowing heavily on the day of his death, and considering the time when Ida arrived at Kamikyu, this was impossible. However, there was no response from the investigating agency at this point.

Subsequently, Makoto Hirata was arrested in January 2012, and Katsuya Takahashi in June 2012, both of whom were involved in the notary office clerk case, and the investigation into the same case was reopened. There was no evidence to support Inoue's new claim or the statements of his accomplices, and since Inoue overturned his past testimony and statements more than 16 years after the incident, the finding of the prosecutor's office was changed to death due to the side effects of anesthetics. The prosecutor's office's finding remained unchanged that the death was caused by the side effects of the anesthetic.

In the first trial of Hirata, the cause of death of the office manager was not a point of contention because Hirata had been charged with the crime of arrest and confinement (without the word "fatality"). The verdict found the cause of death to be a side effect of the anesthetic, and pointed out that Inoue's testimony may have been exaggerated or confused with his memory, as he suddenly made a new statement about the cause of death. Inoue's new argument was not adopted, and on January 13, 2016, the Supreme Court rejected Hirata's appeal and confirmed it.

In the first trial of Katsuya Takahashi, he was charged with manslaughter by arrest and confinement, and the defense disputed the cause of death of the office manager, so a detailed hearing was held on this issue. In addition, Ikuo Hayashi, an accomplice and former doctor, testified that Inoue's testimony was "impossible," and other accomplices also denied Inoue's testimony. On the other hand, Nakagawa's testimony was "supported by the testimony" of other accomplices, and the court found that the cause of death of the office manager was an accidental overdose of anesthetics, and did not adopt Inoue's new argument. The September 7, 2016, appeals court decision against Takahashi also upheld the first trial decision and did not adopt Inoue's new testimony.

As for the reason for Inoue's new claim, the office manager's eldest son said, "It is so different from the previous explanations that I cannot believe all of it. If Nakagawa had killed the victim unrelated to Inoue, Inoue's responsibility to the victim would be lessened."

Inoue also testified that he had told his defense attorney about the possibility that Nakagawa had killed the office manager since his first trial, but that his attorney had stopped him from telling anyone else.

=== Conflict with Naoko Kikuchi ===
At the first trial of Naoko Kikuchi, who was accused of involvement in the Tokyo Metropolitan Government parcel bombing case, Inoue testified that Yasuo Koike asked him to get the approval of the believers he was helping to see if they were ready to be arrested, and that Inoue got the approval of the two female believers and Nakagawa got the approval of Kikuchi. He also testified that she was not surprised when Inoue showed Kikuchi the explosives and offered words of condolence. On June 30, 2014, the Tokyo District Court ruled that Inoue's testimony was credible and that it was based on the fact that he was aware that Kikuchi was going to commit the crime. On June 30, 2014, the Tokyo District Court found Inoue's testimony credible and sentenced Kikuchi to five years in prison.

Later, the Tokyo High Court of the second instance, in its judgment on November 27, 2015, stated that Inoue's testimony was "unnaturally detailed and specific, while many people's memories of that time are vague," and that its credibility should be carefully judged. According to the results of the fact-finding investigation in the second trial, Inoue and others were found to have concealed the purpose of their activities from two female believers who had been coming and going to the room in question (the hiding place in Hachioji City) in other important roles, and Kikuchi was only an assistant of Masami Tsuchiya in the Kushitigarbha building, not a subordinate of Inoue, and was in the position of assistant master, two levels above ordinary believers in the cult. Therefore, Nakagawa's testimony was more credible than Inoue's testimony, and the court annulled the five-year imprisonment sentence for Kikuchi in the first trial and rendered another acquittal. In December 2017, the Supreme Court unanimously upheld the decision and acquitted him.

After his acquittal and release, Kikuchi wrote an article titled "Yoshihiro Inoue's Lies (1) to (5)" in his blog, "Because the Deeper the Darkness, the More Stars You See."

=== Other cases ===
In addition, Inoue and Nakagawa are at odds over who had the raw materials for the sarin used in the sarin gas attack on the subway (the Jiflo issue). Nakagawa revealed at the time of Inoue's first trial that the sarin materials were stored at the hideout he used in Suginami, Tokyo, and in the first trial of Katsuya Takahashi, he described in detail how the materials were stored by Inoue. Inoue denied this and claimed that Nakagawa had it in his possession. This discrepancy was explained by Nakagawa at the first trial of Naoko Kikuchi on May 14, 2014. Nakagawa testified at the first trial of Naoko Kikuchi on May 14, 2014, that "Inoue is trying to say the opposite of what he said because he had a confrontation with me in a previous trial" and that "what Inoue is saying is not true."

This discrepancy between the claims of Inoue and other officials is not only between him and Nakagawa. Inoue, who claims that his own position in the important case was only that of an assistant, and Tomomitsu Niimi, who was the one who took the initiative in the case. In addition, he and Yasuo Koike have been in direct conflict over who was appointed as the driver in the sarin gas attack.

== Execution ==
Until March 14, 2018, all 13 death row inmates in the Aum Shinrikyo case, including Inoue, were incarcerated at the Tokyo Detention House.

However, in January 2018, the criminal trial of the Aum Affair was concluded with the confirmation of Katsuya Takahashi's life imprisonment, and on March 14 of the same year, seven of the 12 death row inmates, excluding Shoko Asahara, were transferred to five other correctional facilities with execution chambers.

Inoue and Tomomitsu Niimi were transferred to the Osaka Detention House on March 14, 2018. On March 15, 2018, the day after the transfer, he filed a request for a retrial with the Tokyo High Court, saying, "I want to make it clear that the facts are different, not to avoid the death penalty."

According to some reports, Inoue was behaving politely even when the execution was approaching, but on the other hand, he was sweating abnormally and was incontinent every night, and was emotionally unstable because he was scared of the execution.

He was executed at Osaka Detention House at the age of 48, on the morning of July 6, 2018. His body was cremated two days later after being taken in by his parents. A false rumor was circulated that Inoue did not expect the death penalty, based only on his last words, "I never thought it would come to this." Inoue's funeral was held at the Okazaki branch of the Jodo Shinshu sect, with which he had a longstanding relationship.And his final words before execution is, "First of all、Good" (まずは、 よし).

== See also ==
- Capital punishment in Japan
- List of executions in Japan

== Bibliography ==
- 降幡賢一 (January 2000). オウム法廷〈5〉ウソつきは誰か?. 朝日文庫 (in Japanese). 朝日新聞社. ISBN 9784022614223.
- 降幡賢一 (September 2002). オウム法廷〈9〉諜報省長官井上嘉浩. 朝日文庫 (in Japanese). 朝日新聞社. ISBN 9784022613882.
- 降幡賢一 (July 2003). オウム法廷〈12〉サリンをつくった男たち. 朝日文庫 (in Japanese). 朝日新聞社. ISBN 9784022614223.
- 森達也 (2010-11-26). A3 (in Japanese). 集英社. ISBN 978-4797671650.
- 森達也; 深山織枝; 早坂武禮 (2017). A4 麻原・オウムへの新しい視点 (in Japanese). 現代書館. ISBN 9784768458211.
- 年報・死刑廃止編集委員会 (2018-10-25). オウム死刑囚からあなたへ 年報・死刑廃止2018 (in Japanese). インパクト出版会. ISBN 9784755402883.
- 門田隆将 (2018-12-13). オウム死刑囚 魂の遍歴――井上嘉浩 すべての罪はわが身にあり (in Japanese). PHP研究所. ISBN 9784569841373.
