= Banjawarn Station =

Pastoral lease in Western Australia

Location in Western Australia

Banjawarn Station is a remote cattle station in Western Australia, that previously operated as a sheep station. In the 1990s the lease to Banjawarn was owned by the Japanese doomsday cult Aum Shinrikyo, and following the Tokyo subway attack was the subject of an Australian Federal Police (AFP) investigation. Banjawarn is one of the 70 largest stations in Australia.

== Description ==
It is situated 350 km (220 miles) north of Kalgoorlie and 800 km (500 miles) north east of Perth, on the edge of the Great Victoria Desert in the community of Leonora. It covers an area of 404,680 hectares (1,000,000 acres).

The land is a mix of Wanderrie, mulga, saltbush and grasslands that support both annual and perennial grasses. Gum trees and mulga follow the four main creeks and other watercourses. Several waterholes and lake systems are also found on the property.

== History ==
The station was established in 1903 and has had several owners.

In 1928, Banjawarn was owned by the Warren brothers and was supporting a flock of 1,000 sheep.

It was owned for a year in 1993 by the Japanese Aum Shinrikyo cult. In 2010, the leasees were Colvin and Adele Day. The property was carrying a herd of about 2,500 head of Droughtmaster, shorthorn and Brahman cattle.

== Aum Shinrikyo ==
Aum Shinrikyo was a Japanese doomsday cult responsible for a range of criminal and terrorist acts. In April 1993, when Kiyohide Hayakawa, deputy leader of the Aum, arrived in Western Australia, Aum Shinrikyo purchased Banjawarn and built a facility there. Hayakawa had come in search of areas suitable for uranium mining. In his notes, he also praised the high quality of uranium ore, although it referred to the state of South Australia, not to Banjawarn. Hayakawa was in Banjawarn in April 1993 and also in May 1993.

Aum Shinrikyo used a front company headed by Yasuko Shimada, an Australian citizen of Japanese descent and a former member of Mahikari, to purchase Banjawarn.

The chairwoman for the Aboriginal community living near the sheep station, Phyllis Thomas, said that she and other Aboriginal people saw about five people wearing full-length suits and helmets on the remote site in late August 1993. The suited sect members were standing by a twin engine airplane and others were in the plane.

In September 1993, a team of Aum scientists arrived in Australia with mislabelled hydrochloric acid among other chemicals.

The Aum group traveled with chemicals and mining equipment on which they paid over $20,000 in excess baggage fees. According to the Australian Federal Police report, among the baggage was a mechanical ditch digger, picks, petrol generators, gas masks, respirators, and shovels. A customs duty of over $15,000 was paid to import these items. Because of the large amount of excess baggage being brought in by the group, Australian Customs searched the entire group. This search revealed four litres of concentrated hydrochloric acid, including some in containers marked as hand soap. Among the other chemicals that Australian customs officials found were ammonium chloride, sodium sulphate, perchloric acid, and aqueous ammonia. All of the chemicals and some of the laboratory equipment were seized by Australian authorities.

New chemicals were purchased in Australia, and a research facility of unknown purpose was established at the site. When raided by the Australian government in 1995, it contained computers and laboratory equipment.

The Australian government, finding that the wells in the region were not operating properly, demanded that a manager be hired to take care of the sheep. The Aum group complied. In early 1994 the research equipment was removed and replaced with sheep farms. The Aum group demanded that they be the only ones to shear the sheep. 2000 sheep were shorn and sold to a slaughterhouse. "The manager did not witness any experiments or mineral exploration."

The site was sold in October 1994. On 20 March 1995, the Aum group released toxic sarin gas into part of the Tokyo subway system, killing 14 people and injuring over 1000. In the subsequent investigation, it was revealed that they had purchased Banjawarn Station, and so the AFP examined the site.

The investigation revealed a number of sheep carcasses that showed signs of exposure to sarin. The soil in the area contained traces of methylphosphonic acid, a residue of sarin use. The police concluded that Banjawarn had been used as a test site for chemical weapons use.

== Seismic event ==
On the night of 28 May 1993, a mysterious seismic disturbance was detected in Western Australia; it was found to have emanated from south of Banjawarn.

The event sent shock waves through hundreds of miles of desert but was witnessed only by a few long-distance truck drivers and gold prospectors. They reported seeing a fireball in the sky and hearing a protracted low-frequency sound. The cause of the event remained a mystery.

Ed Paull, a geophysicist from the Mundaring Observatory, said he received reports of a bright meteor traveling east above the Leonora-Laverton Highway, at about the same time.

An asteroid impact would have left a large crater, perhaps 300 yards (270 m) across, none of which was found. Alternatively, a bolide, or air burst, caused by a stony asteroid of up to some tens of metres in diameter, would not have reached the surface but would probably have exploded in the atmosphere, creating a large shock wave but not an impact crater. Some point to the widely observed February 2013 Russian meteor event as a case for comparison.

A mining explosion (Note: Here, a mining explosion means an explosion produced intentionally as part of mining work, not an accidental explosion in a mine.) was unlikely, as it was 170 times more powerful than the largest mining explosion known in Australia up to that time. The Urban Geoscience Division of the Australian Geological Survey Organisation determined that the seismic traces of the event "showed similar characteristics consistent with typical seismic activity for Western Australia", and that the event was most likely an earthquake.

Following the revelation that Banjawarn was owned by the Aum, there was also speculation in 1997 that this event might have been the result of a test explosion of a nuclear device they had built. The event was determined to have had the strength of "a small nuclear explosion, perhaps equal to up to 2,000 tons of high explosives". It was known that Aum were interested in developing nuclear as well as chemical weapons, as they had recruited two nuclear engineers from the former Soviet Union and had been mining uranium at Banjawarn.

=== IRIS investigation ===
Australian geologist Harry Mason started investigating the event in early 1995, in relation to the damage the event caused to the Alicia Mine, a gold mine in the Leonora-Laverton area. The fireball and the seismic event initially went relatively unnoticed by the news media, except for an article in the Kalgoorlie Miner newspaper, on 1 June 1993. Mason conducted in-person and phone interviews with numerous witnesses to compile a report. According to a New York Times article, it was Mason who brought the seismic event to the attention of the United States Senate investigators.

The U.S. Senate's Permanent Subcommittee on Investigations asked IRIS to investigate the event. Concerning the explosion/earthquake hypotheses, the IRIS report says that the event is more consistent with an earthquake than an explosion (in some aspects, dissimilar to both, and the report notes limitations of the available data). Concerning the meteor hypothesis, the report says that, under some assumptions about the meteor size, stony and carbonaceous meteorites explode in airbursts at altitudes of above 10 km, while iron meteorites impact the surface. The report assumes that a meteor of the first kind (a high-altitude airburst) could not have produced a seismic event, while an impact could. Therefore the report focuses on the possibility of an iron meteorite impacting the surface. It says the observations are consistent with the meteorite scenario, but notes the lack of a crater.

Mason remained convinced that at least some of the observed phenomena were caused by an undeclared test by the Laverton Jindalee Operational Radar Network facility. (Note: As of 2021, there are two JORN facilities near Laverton, one at 28.3°S 122.0°E and another one directly to the east at 28.3°S 122.85°E, both of which can be easily spotted in aerial photographs. The location of the facility is often misreported as 27°S 123.5°E.) Those claims of Mason were often viewed sceptically.

=== U.S. Senate investigation ===
Information about Aum Shinrikyo's activities in Western Australia was revealed by the U.S. Senate's Permanent Subcommittee on Investigations (of the Senate Governmental Affairs Committee) when it investigated both the seismic event and Aum Shinrikyo's activities in general.

Although Hayakawa was in Banjawarn in May 1993, a counsel to the subcommittee said "eventually, we got information that led us to believe the group was out of the country at the time of the blast" (28 May 1993).

Importantly, the subcommittee's report says the cult members who arrived in Western Australia in September 1993 (bringing mining equipment and various chemicals with them) included Shoko Asahara himself. The leader of the Aum cult arrived in Western Australia with a group of followers "including five females under the age of fifteen who were traveling without their parents". Also in the group was Hideo Murai (No. 3 in the organization, holding a doctorate in astrophysics), while Hayakawa (No. 2) had arrived earlier that month.

== See also ==
- List of ranches and stations
- List of pastoral leases in Western Australia
- List of the largest stations in Australia
