= Hiroyuki Jo =

Zainichi Korean assassin (born 1965)

Hiroyuki Jo (徐裕行, Jo Hiroyuki; Korean: 서유행; Seo Yoo-hyeng; born May 25, 1965) is a Zainichi Korean member of Shinshushieikan (神洲士衛館), an uyoku organization, and the Mie Prefecture-based Hane-gumi branch of Yamaguchi-gumi, a yakuza organization. Jo assassinated Hideo Murai, a member of Aum Shinrikyo, on April 23, 1995.

Charges that Kenji Kamimine (上峯 憲司), a former leader of Hane-gumi, ordered Jo to kill Murai were dismissed by the Tokyo High Court. Jo had claimed Kenji had ordered him to kill any Aum Shinrikyo leaders that he could. It is believed that this was done out of fear of the yakuza's connections to the cult being made public.

Jo was sentenced to 12 years in prison for the murder.
