= A (1998 Japanese film) =

- DVD cover
- Directed by: Tatsuya Mori
- Produced by: Takaharu Yasuoka
- Starring: Hiroshi Araki
- Cinematography: Tatsuya Mori; Takaharu Yasuoka
- Edited by: Tatsuya Mori; Takaharu Yasuoka
- Music by: Poe Pak
- Production company: 'A' Production Committee
- Distributed by: Tidepoint Pictures (2006); Facets Multimedia Distribution (2008); Gold View Company Ltd.
- Release date: 1998
- Running time: 136 minutes
- Country: Japan
- Language: Japanese

A is a 1998 Japanese documentary film about the Aum Shinrikyo cult following the arrest of its leaders for instigating the sarin gas attack on the Tokyo subway in 1995. The film focuses on a young spokesman for the cult Hiroshi Araki, a troubled 28-year-old who had severed all family ties and rejected all forms of materialism.

Director Tatsuya Mori was allowed exclusive access to Aum's offices for over a year as news media were continually kept out. However, despite the documentary's unique perspective on Aum's internal workings, it was not financially successful.

Mori released the sequel A2 in 2001, which returned to Araki and examined the competing factions of the sect (renamed Aleph), during the trial of their leader Shoko Asahara and his associates.

== Cast ==
- Hiroshi Araki - Himself

== Reception ==
Describing the documentary as "ornery", a 2012 review in TimeOut said that "Mori's real subject is the reason such cults exist and attract educated disciples; scrupulously impartial, he provides all the evidence necessary to ask very awkward questions about the state and the people."
