= Yoshiyuki Kono =

Yoshiyuki Kono may refer to:

- Yoshiyuki Kono (voice actor)
- Yoshiyuki Kōno (victim), falsely accused by the Japanese media as the perpetrator of the Matsumoto sarin attack
