= Hiroshi Nakamura =

Hiroshi Nakamura may refer to:

- Hiroshi Nakamura (artist) (1932–2026), Japanese artist
- Hiroshi Nakamura (biochemist) (1890–1974), Japanese biochemist
- Hiroshi Nakamura (dissident) (1930–2024), Japanese dissident and convicted murderer
- Hiroshi Nakamura (judoka) (born 1942), Canadian judoka
- Hiroshi Nakamura (architect) (born 1974), Japanese architect
- Hiroshi Nakamura (fighter) (born 1981), Japanese mixed martial artist
