= AUM: The Cult at the End of the World =

2023 documentary film by Ben Braun and Chiaki Yanagimoto

- Directed by: Ben Braun; Chiaki Yanagimoto
- Based on: The Cult at the End of the World by David E. Kaplan and Andrew Marshall
- Produced by: Ben Braun; Chiaki Yanagimoto; Dan Braun; Josh Braun; Rick Brookwell
- Cinematography: Yohei Tateishi; Tim Sutton
- Edited by: Keita Ideno
- Music by: Dan Braun; Charlie Braun
- Production companies: A Fifth Season; Submarine Deluxe
- Release date: January 20, 2023 (Sundance)
- Running time: 106 minutes
- Country: United States
- Languages: English; Japanese
- Box office: $8,268

AUM: The Cult at the End of the World is a 2023 documentary film directed by Ben Braun and Chiaki Yanagimoto in their directorial debuts, based on the book The Cult at the End of the World by David E. Kaplan and Andrew Marshall.

== Premise ==
The film follows the Japanese doomsday cult, Aum Shinrikyo.

== Release ==
AUM: The Cult at the End of the World had its world premiere at the 2023 Sundance Film Festival on January 20. The film was also screened at the 2023 Copenhagen International Documentary Film Festival on March 21 as its international premiere.

== Reception ==
On the review aggregator website Rotten Tomatoes, 66% of 29 critics' reviews are positive, with an average rating of 5.1/10. Metacritic, which uses a weighted average, assigned the film a score of 60 out of 100, based on 8 critics, indicating "mixed or average" reviews.
