= 2019 Tokyo car attack =

Terrorist attack in Tokyo

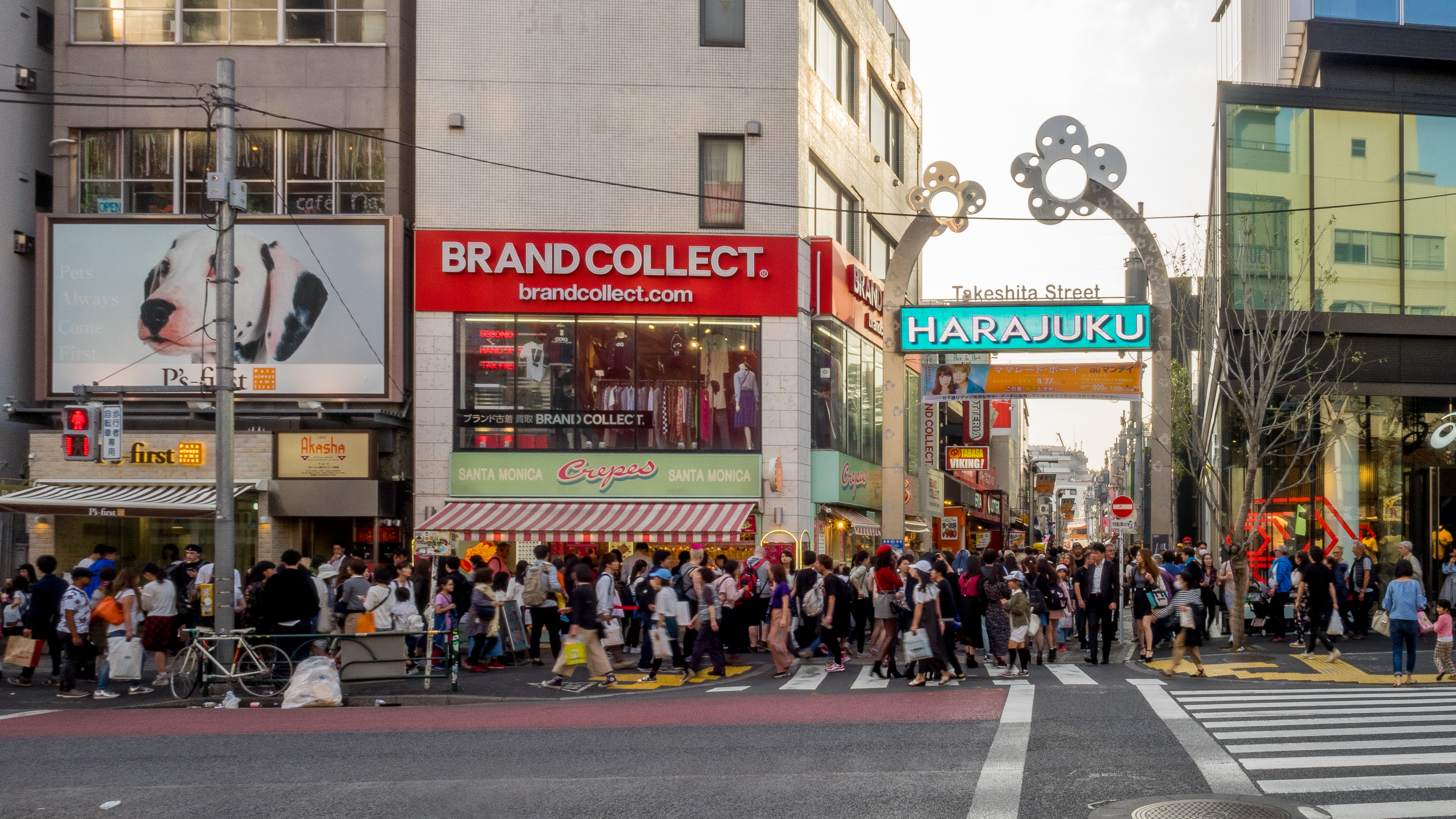
- View from the opposite of Takeshita Street, the site of the attack
- Location: Takeshita Street, Tokyo, Japan
- Date: January 1, 2019; 7 years ago
- Target: Pedestrians
- Attack type: Vehicle-ramming attack, attempted mass murder
- Weapon: Daihatsu Move
- Deaths: 0
- Injuries: 9
- Perpetrator: Kazuhiro Kusakabe
- Motive: Opposition to capital punishment in Japan; Retaliation for the execution of Aum Shinrikyo members
- Convictions: Attempted murder
- Sentence: 18 years in prison

A vehicle-ramming attack occurred on January 1, 2019, in Tokyo, Japan. 21-year-old Kazuhiro Kusakabe told authorities he intentionally rammed into pedestrians crowded on narrow Takeshita Street in the Harajuku district as a terrorist attack in retaliation for the execution of Aum Shinrikyo doomsday cult members. The New Year's Day attack left eight injured. A ninth person was also directly injured by the driver. Kusakabe said he initially planned an arson attack by spreading kerosene with a high-pressure washer on the crowd at the nearby Meiji Shrine but found that vehicles were not permitted there.

Kusakabe was subsequently convicted of attempted murder in connection with the attack. He was sentenced to 18 years in prison.

== Attack ==
The attack occurred shortly after midnight. A car collided with people on Takeshita Street in the Harajuku district, Shibuya ward, Tokyo. The incident occurred close to Meiji Shrine, one of the largest Shinto shrines in Japan. The street was closed to traffic at the time due to New Year's celebrations. The perpetrator entered the street through a gap in the police barricade near the end facing Meiji-dori street and drove 140 meters the wrong way down the street, hitting eight men aged 19–51, and then crashing into a building. The vehicle used in the attack was a rental Daihatsu Move with Osaka license plates. The perpetrator fled the scene, but 20 or 30 minutes later, he was found by police in nearby Yoyogi Park.

A 30-liter tank of kerosene was also found inside the vehicle, along with a pressure washer. There was no fire reported.

== Perpetrator ==
A 21-year-old man, Kazuhiro Kusakabe (日下部 和博, Kusakabe Kazuhiro) (born 1997) of Neyagawa, Osaka, was arrested by police on suspicion of attempted murder. Media quoted the man as claiming he had committed a terrorist act and deliberately driven his car down the narrow street to protest against the death penalty and the execution of Aum Shinrikyo members in July 2018.

Police told several media outlets that they were investigating a link between Kusakabe and a doomsday cult, formerly known as Aum Shinrikyo, which was responsible for the 1995 Tokyo subway sarin attack.

According to The Asahi Shimbun, the suspect told police that he had prepared for an arson attack: "I planned to set fire by spreading kerosene with the high-pressure washer, targeting a crowd at Meiji Shrine." However, police suspect he changed his plan after finding that vehicles were not permitted at the shrine due to the high volume of visitors.

== Victims ==
All of the injured victims are men. Eight of the men, with age ranged from 19 to 51, were injured in the car collision, with the 19-year-old being taken to a nearby hospital in critical condition. The ninth victim, also a man, was mildly injured when Kusakabe struck him while getting out of his vehicle.

== See also ==
- 2008 Akihabara massacre
