= Seiichi Endo =

Aum Shinrikyo member and murderer

- Born: 5 June 1960; Sapporo, Hokkaido, Japan
- Died: 6 July 2018 (aged 58); Tokyo Detention House, Tokyo, Japan
- Organization: Aum Shinrikyo
- Status: Executed by hanging
- Convictions: Mass murder Terrorism
- Penalty: Death

Seiichi Endo (遠藤誠一, Endō Seiichi; 5 June 1960 – 6 July 2018) was a Japanese terrorist and Aum Shinrikyo member who was executed for his participation in the 1995 Tokyo subway sarin attack and a number of other crimes.

He produced the Sarin gas for the attack after leader Shoko Asahara told him to do so.

== Early life ==
Endo was a native of Sapporo, Hokkaido; he graduated from a veterinary school. He later studied virus and genetic engineering at Kyoto University graduate school.

== See also ==
- Capital punishment in Japan
- List of executions in Japan
