= Matsumoto sarin attack =

1994 attempted assassination by Aum Shinrikyo

- Location: 36.2430°N 137.9716°E; Matsumoto, Nagano, Japan
- Date: June 27, 1994; 10:40 pm (JST)
- Attack type: Mass murder, chemical terrorism, terrorism, attempted assassination
- Weapon: Sarin
- Deaths: 8 (including a victim who died in 2008)
- Injuries: 500+
- Perpetrator: Aum Shinrikyo
- Motive: Attempt to assassinate judges presiding over criminal charges against Aum Shinrikyo

The Matsumoto sarin attack was a domestic chemical terrorist attack and attempted assassination perpetrated by members of the Aum Shinrikyo doomsday cult in Matsumoto, Nagano Prefecture, Japan, on the night of June 27, 1994. Eight people were killed and more than 500 were harmed by sarin aerosol that was released from a converted refrigerator truck in the Kaichi Heights area. The attack was perpetrated nine months before the better-known Tokyo subway sarin attack.

== Sarin attack ==
The sarin attack occurred in a quiet residential area in the city of Matsumoto, Nagano Prefecture. In carrying out the attack, Aum Shinrikyo had two goals: to attack three judges who were expected to rule against the cult in a lawsuit concerning a real estate dispute, and to test the efficacy of its sarin—which the cult was manufacturing at one of its facilities—as a weapon of mass murder. Residents of Matsumoto had also angered Aum founder Shoko Asahara by vigorously opposing his plan to set up an office and factory in the city's southern area. Opponents of the plan gathered 140,000 signatures on an anti-Aum petition, equivalent to 70 percent of Matsumoto's population at the time.

Aum's original plan to release the aerosol into the Matsumoto courthouse was altered when the cult members arrived in the city after the courthouse had closed. They decided to instead target a three-story apartment building where the city's judges resided. At 10:40 pm, members of Aum used a converted refrigerator truck to release a cloud of sarin which floated near the home of the judges. The truck's cargo space held "a heating contraption that had been specifically designed to turn" twelve litres of liquid sarin into an aerosol, and fans to diffuse the aerosol into the neighbourhood.

At 11:30 pm, Matsumoto police received an urgent report from paramedics that casualties were being transported to hospital. The patients were suffering from darkened vision, eye pain, headaches, nausea, diarrhea, miosis (constricted pupils), and numbness in their hands. Some victims described having seen a fog with a pungent and irritating smell floating by. A total of 274 people were treated. Five dead residents were discovered in their apartments, and two died in hospital immediately after admission. An eighth victim, Sumiko Kono, remained in a coma for fourteen years and died in 2008.

The day after the attack, dead fish were found in a pond near the scene. The bodies of dogs, birds, and a large number of caterpillars were found in the area. Grass and trees had withered and the trees' leaves had discoloured. Nearly all of the casualties had been discovered within a radius of 150 metres from the centre, near the pond. People near open windows or in air-conditioned rooms had been exposed to the aerosol. Forensic investigation using gas chromatography–mass spectrometry revealed that the poison was the nerve agent sarin.

The fatalities included Yutaka Kobayashi, a 23-year-old salaryman, and Mii Yasumoto, a 29-year-old medical school student.

== Investigation ==
Police received an anonymous tip implicating Aum after the attacks, but the cult was not officially implicated in the incident until after the later Tokyo subway sarin attack in 1995. One section of the tip read, "Matsumoto was definitely an experiment of sorts. The result of this experiment in an open space: seven dead, over 200 injured. If sarin is released in an enclosed space, say, a crowded subway it is easy to imagine a massive catastrophe."

After the incident, police focused their investigation on Yoshiyuki Kōno, whose wife was a victim put in a coma by the aerosol. It was discovered that Kōno had stored a large amount of pesticide in his residence. Although it was later proven that sarin cannot be manufactured from pesticides, Keiichi Tsuneishi, a Japanese historian, claimed the nerve agent is synthesizable from organophosphorus pesticides, and Kōno was dubbed by some in the media "the Poison Gas Man". He subsequently received hate mail, death threats, and intense legal pressure. After the truth became known, every major Japanese newspaper apologized to Kōno, including those that had not named him as a suspect.

After the Tokyo attack, the blame was shifted to the Aum Shinrikyo cult. Matsumoto's police chief, on behalf of the police department and media, publicly apologized to Kōno. Kōno's wife later awoke from her coma, but recovered neither speech nor body movement; she died in 2008.

Several Aum members were found guilty of masterminding both incidents. Thirteen Aum members, including cult leader Shoko Asahara, were sentenced to death, and were executed in 2018. Combined, the attacks resulted in 21 deaths and thousands of hospitalizations and outpatient treatments.
