= Freedom of religion in Japan =

Article 20 of the Japanese Constitution provides for freedom of religion in Japan.

In 2023, the country was scored 4 out of 4 for religious freedom.

== Religious demography ==
The government of Japan does not require religious groups to report their membership, so it was difficult to accurately determine the number of adherents to different religious groups. The Agency for Cultural Affairs reported in 2017 that membership claims by religious groups totaled 182 million. This is out of a total population of 127 million, but does not account for overlapping memberships (some families may be registered at both a Buddhist temple and a Shinto shrine), or double membership due to change of address. This number, which is nearly twice Japan's population, reflects many citizens' affiliation with multiple religions. For example, it is very common for Japanese to practice both Buddhist and Shinto rites.

According to the Agency's annual yearbook, in 2020, 88 million persons identify themselves as Shinto, 84 million as Buddhist, 2 million as Christian, and over 7 million follow "other" religions, including Tenrikyo, Seicho-no-Ie, the Church of World Messianity, and PL Kyodan. Academics estimate that there are 230,000 Muslims in Japan, 20% of whom are Japanese citizens; there are an estimated 2–4,000 Jews in the country.

As of December 2017, under the 1951 Religious Juridical Persons Law, the Government recognized 157 schools of Buddhism. The six major schools of Buddhism are Tendai, Shingon, Jōdō (Jōdo-shū and Jōdo Shinshū sects), Zen (Sōtō and Rinzai sects), Nichiren, and Nanto Rokushū. In addition, there are a number of Buddhist lay organizations, including Soka Gakkai, which reported a membership of eight million. The two main schools of Shinto are the Association of Shinto Shrines and Kyohashinto. In addition, the postwar legal changes ended the Japanese imperial regime's use of discourses of "not religion" (hishūkyō) to protect the religious privileges of state backed Shinto movements.

== Status of religious freedom ==
=== Legal and policy framework ===
The Constitution provides for freedom of religion, and the government respects this right in practice. At all levels, the Japanese Government seeks to protect this right in full and does not tolerate its abuse, either by governmental or private actors.

As of December 2022, 180,544 religious groups were certified by the government as religious organizations with corporate status, according to the Agency for Cultural Affairs. The government does not require religious groups to register or apply for certification; however, certified religious organizations receive tax benefits. More than 83 percent of religious groups were certified by 2016.

Japanese law states that government schools cannot give religious instructions; private schools are permitted to teach specific religions.

In the wake of the 1995 sarin gas attack on Tokyo's subway system by Aum Shinrikyo, the Religious Juridical Persons Law was amended in 1996 to provide the government with the authority to supervise certified religious groups. The amended law requires certified religious organizations to disclose their assets to the government and empowers the government to investigate possible violations of regulations governing for-profit activities. Authorities have the right to suspend a religious organization's for-profit activities if they violate these regulations.

=== Forced religious conversion ===
The U.S. State Department cited the report by the Human Rights Without Frontiers International, which is connected to CESNUR, in the 2011 annual International Religious Freedom Report to Japan summarized that deprogrammers cooperate with family members on "abductions" of members of the Unification Church and other minority religious groups for several years. In the same report, it cited reports by other NGOs which accused the Unification Church of "exaggerating or fabricating" reports of the unethical deprogramming efforts.

=== Other cases ===
In 2011, 14 Muslims filed a lawsuit against the government, when leaked documents showed that Tokyo Metropolitan Police Department and the National Police Agency systematically collected their personal data, religious activities and associations, allegedly because of their religion. The case was dismissed in January 2014; the court stated that the intrusive police surveillance was “necessary and inevitable” in order to protect Japan against the threat of international terrorism, although it did find that the police were negligent in protecting the information they had collected, and ordered compensation to be paid to the plaintiffs.

The conservative Liberal Democratic Party was founded by Nobusuke Kishi and later led by his grandson, former prime minister Shinzo Abe; the LDP has historically had links to the Unification Church. In July 2022, Abe was assassinated by Tetsuya Yamagami, who stated that he resented the Unification Church as his mother was "forced" to make a large donation to it, which led to difficulties for his family. It was announced in October 2022 that the Japanese government would start an investigation into the extent of Abe's relationship with the Unification Church. The LDP also announced that they will expel any of its own members who did not break any ongoing relationships with the Unification Church. The opposing Constitutional Democratic Party of Japan, Democratic Party for the People and Japanese Communist Party all plan to launch their own investigations into the Unification Church's political influence and connections in Japanese politics.

== See also ==
- Religion in Japan
- Human rights in Japan
