= Tomomitsu Niimi =

Aum Shinrikyo member and murderer

- Born: 9 March 1964; Okazaki, Aichi, Japan
- Died: 6 July 2018 (aged 54); Osaka Detention House, Japan
- Other name: Ferdinand
- Organization: Aum Shinrikyo
- Spouse: Yuki Niimi
- Status: Executed by hanging
- Convictions: Mass murder Terrorism
- Penalty: Death

Tomomitsu Niimi (新実 智光, Niimi Tomomitsu; 9 March 1964 – 6 July 2018) was a Japanese terrorist and Aum Shinrikyo member convicted for his participation in the Sarin gas attack on the Tokyo subway and a number of other crimes. He was Aum's "minister of internal affairs".

== Background ==
Judge Yujiro Nakatani said that his Aum-related crimes began in 1989 with the strangulation killing of Shuji Taguchi, who had attempted to flee from the cult. He also murdered anti-cult lawyer Tsutsumi Sakamoto and Sakamoto's wife and son the same year.

== Tokyo subway sarin attack ==
Before the Tokyo subway gas attack, Asahara wanted to try the sarin gas on humans. He chose his rival, Daisaku Ikeda, the leader of Soka Gakkai, one of Japan's most popular "new religions". Asahara directed his men to rig a spraying device on a suitable vehicle at one of the nights when Ikeda was supposed to speak in public. All was going well until the device began to leak, splashing liquid sarin onto Niimi, Asahara's security chief. Kiyohide Hayakawa was present and quickly administered an antidote in time to prevent Niimi's nervous system from shutting down.

Together with Ikuo Hayashi, Niimi participated in the subway gas attack (there were several other perpetrators as well): Hayashi delivered the sarin-filled package and pierced it with a sharpened umbrella tip, while Niimi was a car driver.

== Legal proceedings ==
Tomomitsu Niimi was eventually convicted of murder and other terrorism charges. Niimi was subsequently sentenced to death by hanging. Unlike other former Aum members involved in criminal acts, Niimi made no apologies. During an earlier court hearing, Niimi proclaimed his "absolute faith" in Shoko Asahara, Aum Shinrikyo's founder, and spoke about various levels of 'enlightenments' he had been able to experience during his religious trainings in Aum. He then spoke about human sufferings, saying that "some are suffering thinking that this world is illusory and some thinking that it is real. Concerning the former members who now testify against their guru [Asahara] who did them so much good, I believe their suffering is based on the perceptions that this world is real".

Niimi was among the first seven of the Aum Shinrikyo members on death row to be executed on 6 July 2018, including leader Shoko Asahara. Relatives of some of the victims said they approved of the execution.

== See also ==
- Capital punishment in Japan
- List of executions in Japan
