= Agency for Cultural Affairs =

Special body of the Japanese Ministry of Education

Coordinates: 35°1′14″N 135°45′22″E

- 文化庁; Bunka-chō

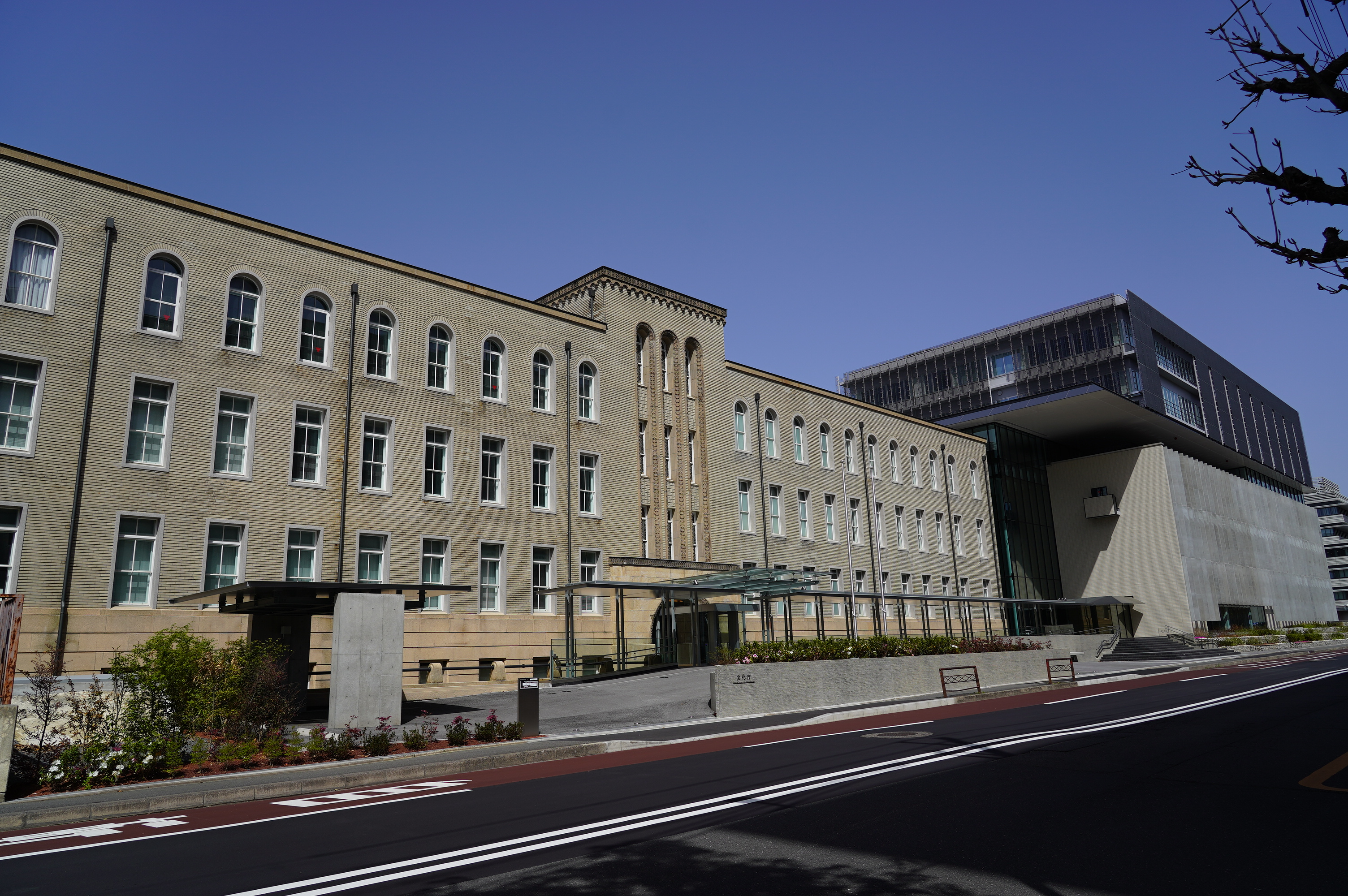
- Office building

Agency overview
- Formed: June 15, 1968; 58 years ago
- Preceding agencies: Cultural Bureau of the Ministry of Education; Committee for the Protection of Cultural Properties
- Jurisdiction: Japan
- Headquarters: 85-4 Yabunouchi-cho, Shimochoja-machi-dori, Shinmachi-nishi-iru, Kamigyo-ku, Kyoto-shi, Kyoto 602-8959, Japan
- Employees: 291 (2025)
- Annual budget: ¥107 billion (2026)
- Minister responsible: Gakuji Ito, Commissioner for Cultural Affairs
- Parent department: Ministry of Education, Culture, Sports, Science and Technology
- Child agency: Japan Art Academy
- Website: www.bunka.go.jp/english/index.html

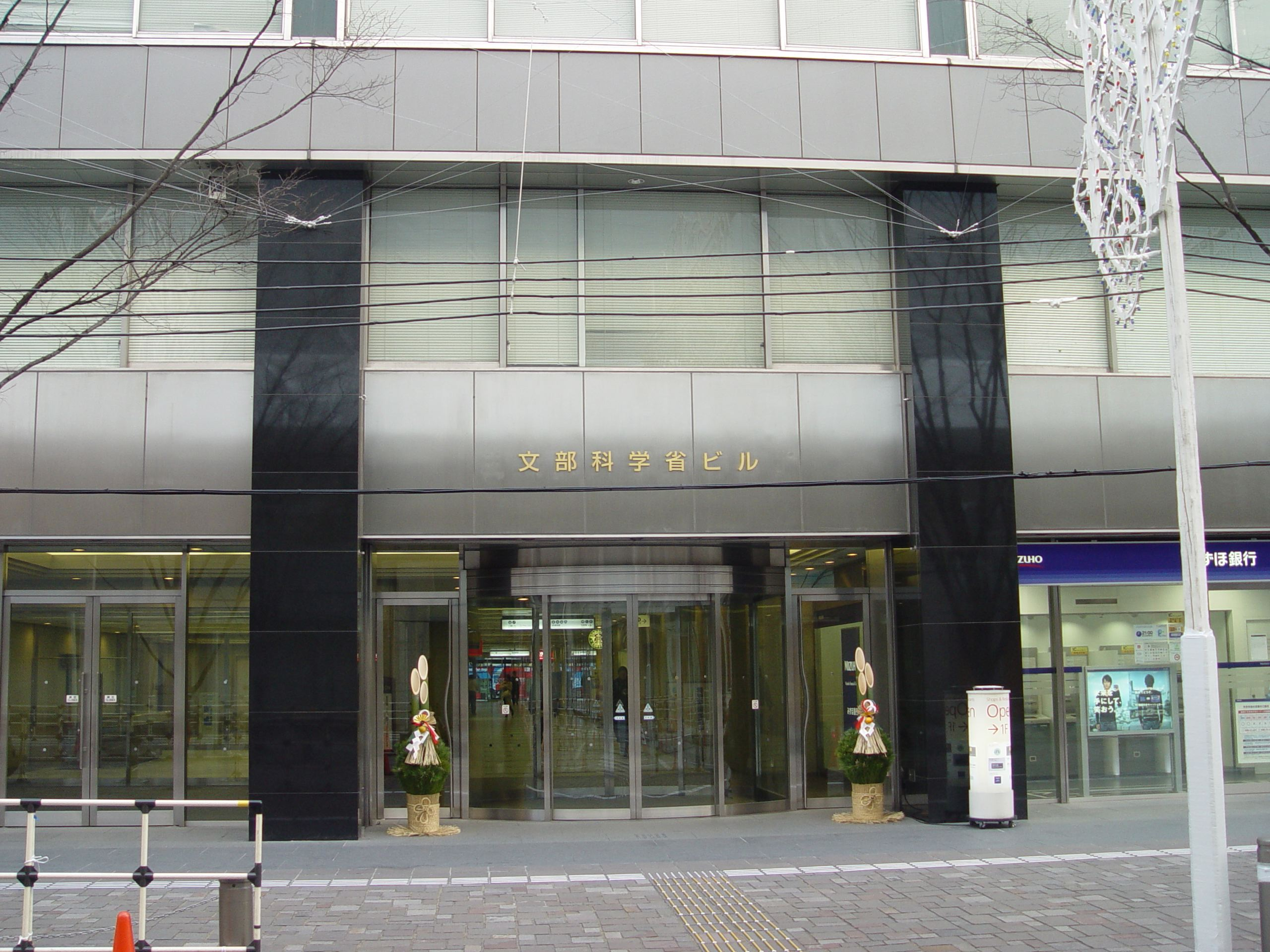
Office building with kadomatsu in 2005

The Agency for Cultural Affairs (Japanese: 文化庁, Hepburn: Bunka-chō) is a special body of the Japanese Ministry of Education, Culture, Sports, Science and Technology (MEXT). It was set up in 1968 to promote Japanese arts and culture.

== Overview ==
The agency's Cultural Affairs Division disseminates information about the arts within Japan and internationally, and the Cultural Properties Protection Division protects the nation's cultural heritage. The Cultural Affairs Division is concerned with such areas as art and culture promotion, art copyrights, and improvements in the national language. It also supports both national and local arts and cultural festivals, and it funds traveling cultural events in music, theater, dance, art exhibitions, and film-making. Special prizes are offered to encourage young artists and established practitioners, and some grants are given each year to enable them to train abroad. The agency funds national museums of modern art in Kyoto and Tokyo and The National Museum of Western Art in Tokyo, which exhibit both Japanese and international shows. The agency also supports the Japan Art Academy, which honors eminent persons of arts and letters, appointing them to membership and offering ¥3.5 million in prize money. Awards are made in the presence of the Emperor, who personally bestows the highest accolade, the Order of Culture. In 1989, for the first time two women—a writer and a costume designer—were nominated for the Order of Cultural Merit, another official honor carrying the same stipend.

The Cultural Properties Protection Division originally was established to oversee restorations after World War II. As of April 2018, it was responsible for 1,805 historic sites, including the ancient capitals of Asuka, Heijokyo, and Fujiwara, 410 scenic places, and 1,027 national monuments, and for such indigenous fauna as ibis and storks. In addition, over 10,000 items had the lesser designation of Important Cultural Properties, with fine arts and crafts accounting for the largest share, with over 10,000 so designated.

The government protects buried properties, of which some 300,000 had been identified. During the 1980s, many important prehistoric and historic sites were investigated by the archaeological institutes that the agency funded, resulting in about 2,000 excavations in 1989. The wealth of material unearthed shed new light on the controversial period of the formation of the Japanese state.

A 1975 amendment to the Cultural Properties Protection Act of 1897 enabled the Agency for Cultural Affairs to designate traditional areas and buildings in urban centers for preservation. From time to time, various endangered traditional artistic skills are added to the agency's preservation roster, such as the 1989 inclusion of a kind of ancient doll making.

One of the most important roles of the Cultural Properties Protection Division is to preserve the traditional arts and crafts and performing arts through their living exemplars. Individual artists and groups, such as a dance troupe or a pottery village, are designated as mukei bunkazai (intangible cultural assets) in recognition of their skill. Major exponents of the traditional arts have been designated as ningen kokuho (living national treasures). About seventy persons are so honored at any one time; in 1989 the six newly designated masters were a kyogen (comic) performer, a chanter of bunraku (puppet) theater, a performer of the nagauta shamisen (a special kind of stringed instrument), the head potter making Nabeshima decorated porcelain ware, the top pictorial lacquer-ware artist, and a metal-work expert. Each was provided a lifetime annual pension of ¥2 million and financial aid for training disciples.

A number of institutions come under the aegis of the Agency for Cultural Affairs: the national museums of Japanese and Asian art in Tokyo, Kyoto, Nara, Osaka and Fukuoka, the cultural properties research institutes at Tokyo and Nara, and the national theaters. During the 1980s, the National Noh Theatre and the National Bunraku Theater were constructed by the government.

As of April 2021, it is led by the Commissioner for Cultural Affairs, Shunichi Tokura.

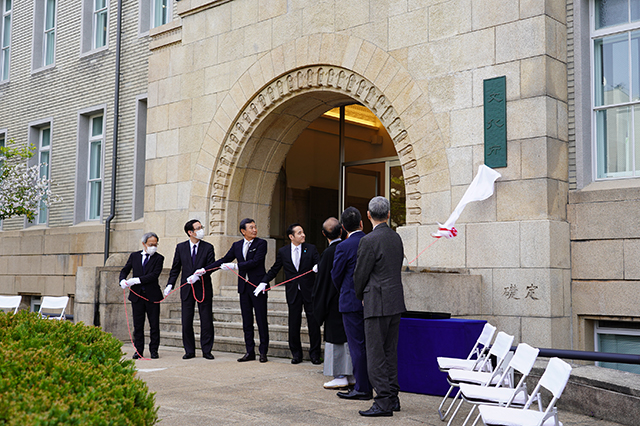
The opening ceremony of the new office was held in 2023.

The agency is based in the Kamigyo Ward of Kyoto City. Main parts of the agency moved to Kyoto in 2023, while other parts remained in Tokyo.

== Organization ==
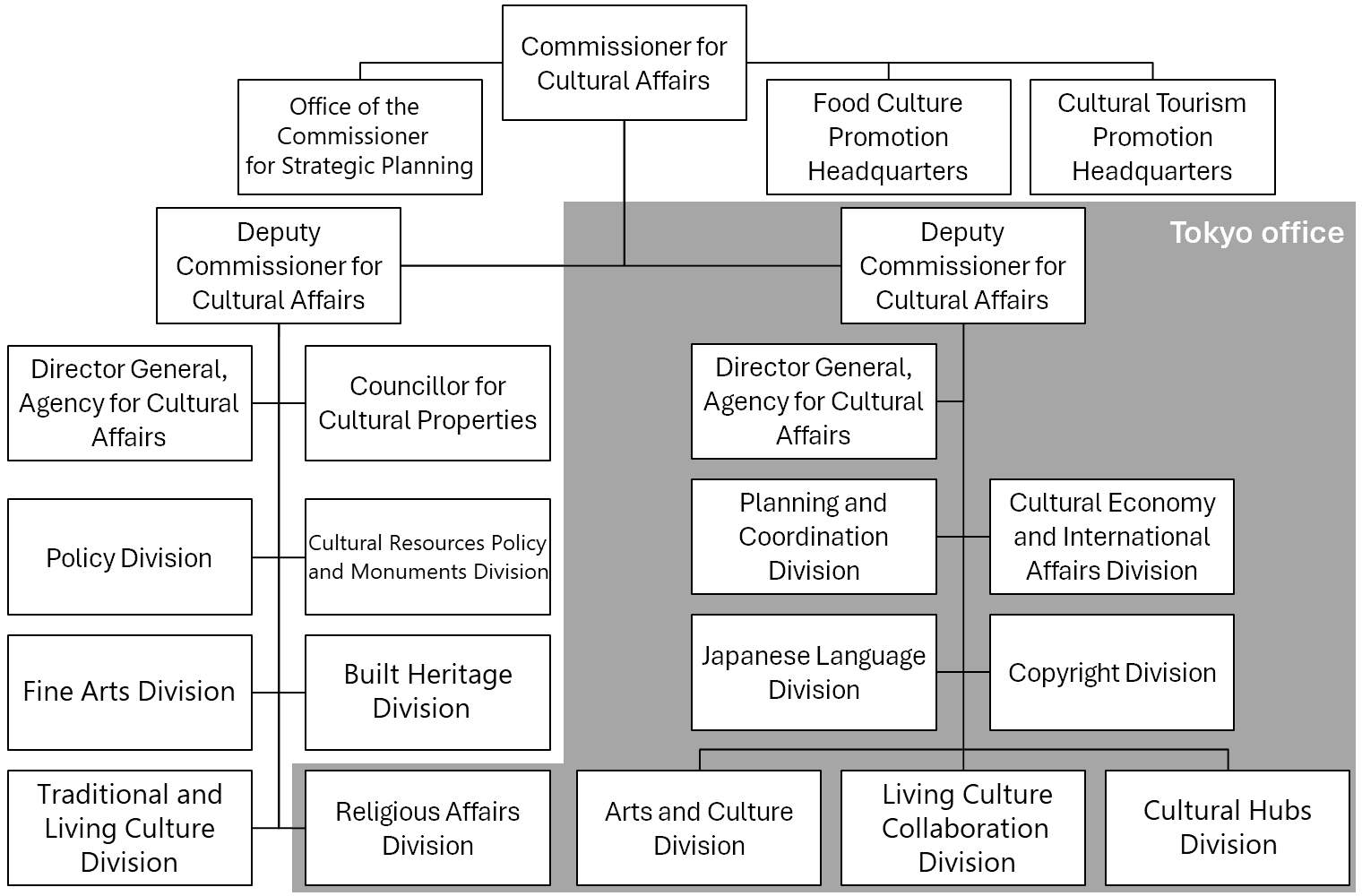
Organizational chart as of April 1, 2026.

The agency contains the following divisions:

- Policy Division – personnel management, taxation, accounting, public relations, information dissemination, and research on cultural policies.
- Planning and Coordination Division – development of basic cultural policies, promoting Ainu culture, overseeing the Japan Arts Council, coordinating cultural facilities, managing the National Museum of Nature and Science, etc.
- Cultural Economy and International Affairs Division – economy strategy, international cooperation
- Japanese Language Division – Promotion of the Japanese language, and promotion and awareness-raising of the Ainu language.
- Copyright Division – protection and utilization of authors' rights, publication rights, and neighboring rights, promotion of the distribution of copyrighted works, and international copyright affairs
- Cultural Resources Policy and Monuments Division – coordination for the conservation and utilization of cultural properties
- Fine Arts Division – tangible cultural properties other than buildings, intangible cultural properties, conservation techniques
- Built Heritage Division – buildings, preservation districts, and National Archives of Modern Architecture.
- Religious Affairs Division – certification, technical guidance and advice
- Arts and Culture Division – promoting performing arts, film, media arts, and other forms of artistic culture, setting standards for arts education in schools, fostering human resources, and overseeing theaters, concert halls, and related facilities.
- Traditional and Living Culture Division – preservation and utilization of intangible and folk cultural properties, promoting living culture, and advancing regional cultural development and inclusive society.
- Living Culture Collaboration Division – living culture including food culture and inbound tourism.
- Cultural Hubs Division – Tourism and Japan Heritage
- Japan Art Academy

List of commissioners
No.	Portrait	Name	Term
1		Hidemi Kon	June 15, 1968 – July 1, 1972
2		Kenji Adachi	July 1, 1972 – September 12, 1975
3		Hisashi Yasujima	September 12, 1975 – September 20, 1977
4		Tadashi Inumaru	September 20, 1977 –June 6, 1980
5		Bunichiro Sano	June 6, 1980 – July 5, 1983
6		Isao Suzuki	July 5, 1983 – March 31, 1985
7		Shumon Miura	April 1, 1985 – September 1, 1986
8		Hitoshi Ōsaki	September 1, 1986 – June 10, 1988
9		Hiroshi Ueki	June 10, 1988 – July 1, 1990
10		Tsuneaki Kawamura	July 1, 1990 – July 1, 1992
11		Hiroyasu Uchida	July 1, 1992 – July 25, 1994
12		Atsuko Tōyama	July 25, 1994 – January 9, 1996
13		Shigeru Yoshida	January 9, 1996 – July 1, 1997
14		Hideki Hayashida	July 1, 1997 – June 15, 2000
15		Masamine Sasaki	June 15, 2000 – January 18, 2002
16		Hayao Kawai	January 18, 2002 – November 1, 2006
17		Shinji Kondo	November 1, 2006 – April 1, 2007
18		Tamotsu Aoki	April 1, 2007 – July 14, 2009
19		Hideo Tamai	July 14, 2009 – July 29, 2010
20		Seiichi Kondō	July 30, 2010 – July 7, 2013
21		Masanori Aoyagi	July 8, 2013 – April 1, 2016
22		Ryohei Miyata	April 1, 2016 – March 31, 2021
23		Shunichi Tokura	April 1, 2021 – March 31, 2026
24		Gakuji Ito	since April 1, 2026

== See also ==
- Culture of Japan
- Cultural Property (Japan)
- National Treasure (Japan)
- Living National Treasure (Japan)
- Japanese copyright law
- Freedom of religion in Japan
