= Aum Shinrikyo =

Japanese cult and terrorist organization

Aleph
- アレフ
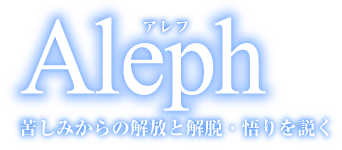
- Type: Japanese new religious movement
- Classification: Buddhist
- Orientation: Dharmic
- Theology: Western millenarianism/millennialism (formerly)
- Structure: Yoga meetings
- Region: Japan
- Founder: Shoko Asahara
- Origin: 1987; 39 years ago Tokyo, Japan
- Separations: Hikari no Wa (2008), Yamada's Club, Keroyon Club
- Members: Approximately 1,650 (2011)
- Other names: Aum Shinrikyo (オウム真理教, Ōmu Shinrikyō) (1984–2007)

Aleph (Japanese: アレフ, Hepburn: Arefu), better known by their former name Aum Shinrikyo (オウム真理教, Ōmu Shinrikyō; lit. 'religion of Aum Supreme Truth'), is a Japanese new religious movement and doomsday cult founded by Shoko Asahara in 1987. It carried out the deadly Tokyo subway sarin attack in 1995 and was then found to have been responsible for the Matsumoto sarin attack the previous year.

The group says that those who carried out the attacks did so secretly, without their plans being known to other executives and ordinary believers. Asahara insisted on his innocence in a radio broadcast relayed from Russia and directed toward Japan. On 6 July 2018, after exhausting all appeals, Asahara and six followers on death row were executed as punishment for the 1995 attacks and other crimes. Six additional followers were executed on 26 July. At 12:10 am, on New Year's Day 2019, at least nine people were injured (one seriously) when a car was deliberately driven into crowds celebrating the new year on Takeshita Street in Tokyo. Local police reported the arrest of Kazuhiro Kusakabe, the suspected driver, who allegedly admitted to intentionally ramming his vehicle into crowds to protest his opposition to the death penalty, specifically in retaliation for the execution of the aforementioned Aum cult members.

Aum Shinrikyo, which split into Aleph and Hikari no Wa in 2007, had already been formally designated a terrorist organization by several countries, including Russia, Canada, Japan, France, Kazakhstan, and the European Union. It was previously designated by the United States as a terrorist organization until 2022, when the State Department determined the group to be largely defunct.

The Public Security Intelligence Agency considered Aleph and Hikari no Wa to be branches of a "dangerous religion" and it announced in January 2015 that they would remain under surveillance for three more years. The Tokyo District Court canceled the extension to surveillance of Hikari no Wa in 2017 following legal challenges from the group, but continued to keep Aleph under watch. The government appealed the cancellation, and in February 2019, the Tokyo High Court overturned the lower court's decision, reinstating the surveillance, citing no major changes between Aum Shinrikyo and Hikari no Wa.

== History ==
Aum Shinrikyo symbol

The movement "evolved out of a yoga school founded by Asahara Shoko in the Shibuya district of Tokyo in February 1984". The movement was known as Ōmu Shinsen no Kai (オウム神仙の会, "Aum Heavenly Sage Association") and steadily grew in the following years. Its original teachings were based on doctrines derived from Nichiren-based sects such as Nichiren Shōshū and Soka Gakkai. They gained official status as a religious organization in 1989 and attracted a considerable number of graduates from Japan's elite universities, thus being dubbed a "religion for the elite".

=== Early activities ===
Shinri Party (Truth Party) 真理党
- Leader: Shoko Asahara
- Founded: 1989
- Dissolved: 2018
- Ideology: World salvation based on the teachings of Aum Shinrikyo
- Candidates in the 1990 Japanese general election: 25

Since its inception, Aum was controversial, but it was not initially known for its serious crimes. It was during this early period that Asahara became obsessed with Biblical prophecies. Aum's public relations activities included publishing comics and animated cartoons that attempted to tie its religious ideas to popular anime and manga themes, including space missions, powerful weapons, world conspiracies, and the quest for ultimate truth. Aum published several magazines including Vajrayana Sacca and Enjoy Happiness, adopting a somewhat missionary attitude.

Isaac Asimov's science fiction Foundation Trilogy was referenced "depicting as it does an elite group of spiritually evolved scientists forced to go underground during an age of barbarism to prepare themselves for the moment...when they will emerge to rebuild civilization". Lifton posited that Aum's publications used Christian and Buddhist ideas to impress what he considered to be the more shrewd and educated Japanese who were not attracted to boring, purely traditional sermons.

Advertising and recruitment activities, dubbed the "Aum Salvation plan", included claims of curing physical illnesses with health improvement techniques, realizing life goals by improving intelligence and positive thinking, and concentrating on what was important at the expense of leisure. This was to be accomplished by practicing ancient teachings, accurately translated from original Pali suttas (these three were referred to as "threefold salvation"). These efforts resulted in Aum becoming one of the fastest-growing religious groups in Japan's history.

David E. Kaplan and Andrew Marshall claim that its practices remained secret. Initiation rituals often involved the use of hallucinogens, such as LSD. Religious practices often involved extremely ascetic practices claimed to be "yoga". These included everything from renunciants being hung upside down to being given shock therapy.

In the early days, Aum was able to recruit a variety of people ranging from bureaucrats to personnel from the Japanese Self-Defense Forces and the Tokyo Metropolitan Police.

=== Incidents before 1995 ===
Aum affair
Date	1989 – 20 March 1995
Location	Japan
Result	Arrest of Shoko Asahara; Government Victory

Belligerents
Japan	Aum Shinrikyo

Commanders and leaders
Tomiichi Murayama	Shoko Asahara (executed)

Units involved
MPD; Riot Police Unit; 1st Airborne Brigade; civilian protesters	Armed believers

Casualties and losses
27 killed 6,000+ injured	1 killed 192+ arrested (later 13 executed)

The cult started attracting controversy in the late 1980s with accusations of deception of recruits, holding cult members against their will, forcing members to donate money, and murdering a cult member who tried to leave in February 1989.

In October 1989, the group's negotiations with Tsutsumi Sakamoto, an anti-cult lawyer threatening a lawsuit against them, which could potentially bankrupt the group, failed. In the same month, Sakamoto recorded an interview for a talk show on the Japanese TV station TBS. The network then had the interview secretly shown to the group without notifying Sakamoto, intentionally breaking protection of sources. The group then pressured TBS to cancel the broadcast. The following month, Sakamoto, his wife and his child went missing from their home in Yokohama. The police were unable to resolve the case at the time, although some of his colleagues publicly voiced their suspicions of the group. It was not until after the 1995 Tokyo attack that they were found to have been murdered and their bodies dumped in separate locations by cult members.

Kaplan and Marshall allege in their book that Aum was also connected with such activities as extortion. The group, authors report, "commonly took patients into its hospitals and then forced them to pay exorbitant medical bills".

The cult is known to have considered assassinations of several individuals critical of the cult, such as the heads of Buddhist sects Soka Gakkai and The Institute for Research in Human Happiness. After manga artist Yoshinori Kobayashi began satirizing the cult, he was included on Aum's assassination list. An assassination attempt was made on Kobayashi in 1993.

In 1991, Aum began to use wiretapping to get NTT uniforms/equipment and created a manual for wiretapping.

In July 1993, cult members sprayed large amounts of liquid containing Bacillus anthracis spores from a cooling tower on the roof of Aum Shinrikyo's Tokyo headquarters. However, their plan to cause an anthrax epidemic failed, likely because they used a vaccine strain of Bacillus anthracis that is generally regarded as nonpathogenic. The attack resulted in a large number of complaints about bad odors but no infections.

At the end of 1993, the cult started secretly manufacturing the nerve agent sarin and, later, VX. Aum tested its sarin on sheep at Banjawarn Station, a remote pastoral property in Western Australia, killing 29 sheep.

On the night of 27 June 1994, the cult carried out a chemical weapons attack against civilians when they released sarin in the central Japanese city of Matsumoto, Nagano. With the help of a converted refrigerator truck, members of the cult released a cloud of sarin, which floated near the homes of judges who were overseeing a lawsuit concerning a real-estate dispute, which was predicted to go against the cult. This Matsumoto incident killed eight and harmed 500 more. Police investigations focused only on an innocent local resident, Yoshiyuki Kouno, and failed to implicate the cult at the time. It was only after the Tokyo subway attack that Aum Shinrikyo was discovered to be behind the Matsumoto sarin attack.

At the end of 1994, the cult broke into the Hiroshima factory of Mitsubishi Heavy Industries, in an attempt to steal technical documents on military weapons such as tanks and artillery.

In December 1994 and January 1995, Aum Shinrikyo member Masami Tsuchiya synthesized 100 to 200 grams (3.5 to 7.1 oz) of VX which was used to attack three people. On 2 December, Noboru Mizuno, who was believed to have assisted former members of Aum, was attacked with syringes containing VX gas, leaving him in a serious condition. Tadahito Hamaguchi, whom Asahara suspected was a spy, was attacked at 7:00 am on 12 December 1994 on the street in Osaka by Tomomitsu Niimi and another Aum member, who sprinkled the nerve agent on his neck. He chased them for about 100 yards (91 m) before collapsing, dying 10 days later without coming out of a deep coma. Doctors in the hospital suspected at the time he had been poisoned with an organophosphate pesticide, the cause of death pinned down only after cult members arrested for the subway attack in Tokyo in March 1995 confessed to the killing. Ethyl methylphosphonate, methylphosphonic acid, and diisopropyl-2-(methylthio) ethylamine were later found in the body of the victim; unlike the cases for sarin (Matsumoto incident and Sarin gas attack on the Tokyo subway), VX was not used for mass murder.

On 4 January 1995, the cult tried to kill Hiroyuki Nagaoka, an important member of the Aum Victims' Society, a civil organization that protested against the sect's activities, in the same way. In February 1995, several cult members kidnapped Kiyoshi Kariya, the 69-year-old brother of an escaped former member, from a Tokyo street and took him to a compound in Kamikuishiki near Mount Fuji, where he was killed. His corpse was destroyed in a microwave-powered incinerator and the remnants disposed of in Lake Kawaguchi. Before Kariya was abducted, he had been receiving threatening phone calls demanding to know the whereabouts of his sister, and he had left a note saying, "If I disappear, I was abducted by Aum Shinrikyo".

Police made plans to simultaneously raid cult facilities across Japan in March 1995. Prosecutors alleged Asahara was tipped off about this and that he ordered the Tokyo subway attack to divert police.

Aum had also attempted to manufacture 1,000 assault rifles, but only completed one. According to the testimony of Kenichi Hirose at the Tokyo District Court in 2000, Asahara wanted the group to be self-sufficient in manufacturing copies of the Soviet Union's main infantry weapon, the AK-74; one rifle was smuggled into Japan to be studied so that Aum could reverse engineer and mass-produce the AK-74. Police seized AK-74 components and blueprints from a vehicle used by an Aum member on 6 April 1995.

=== Tokyo subway sarin attack and related incidents ===
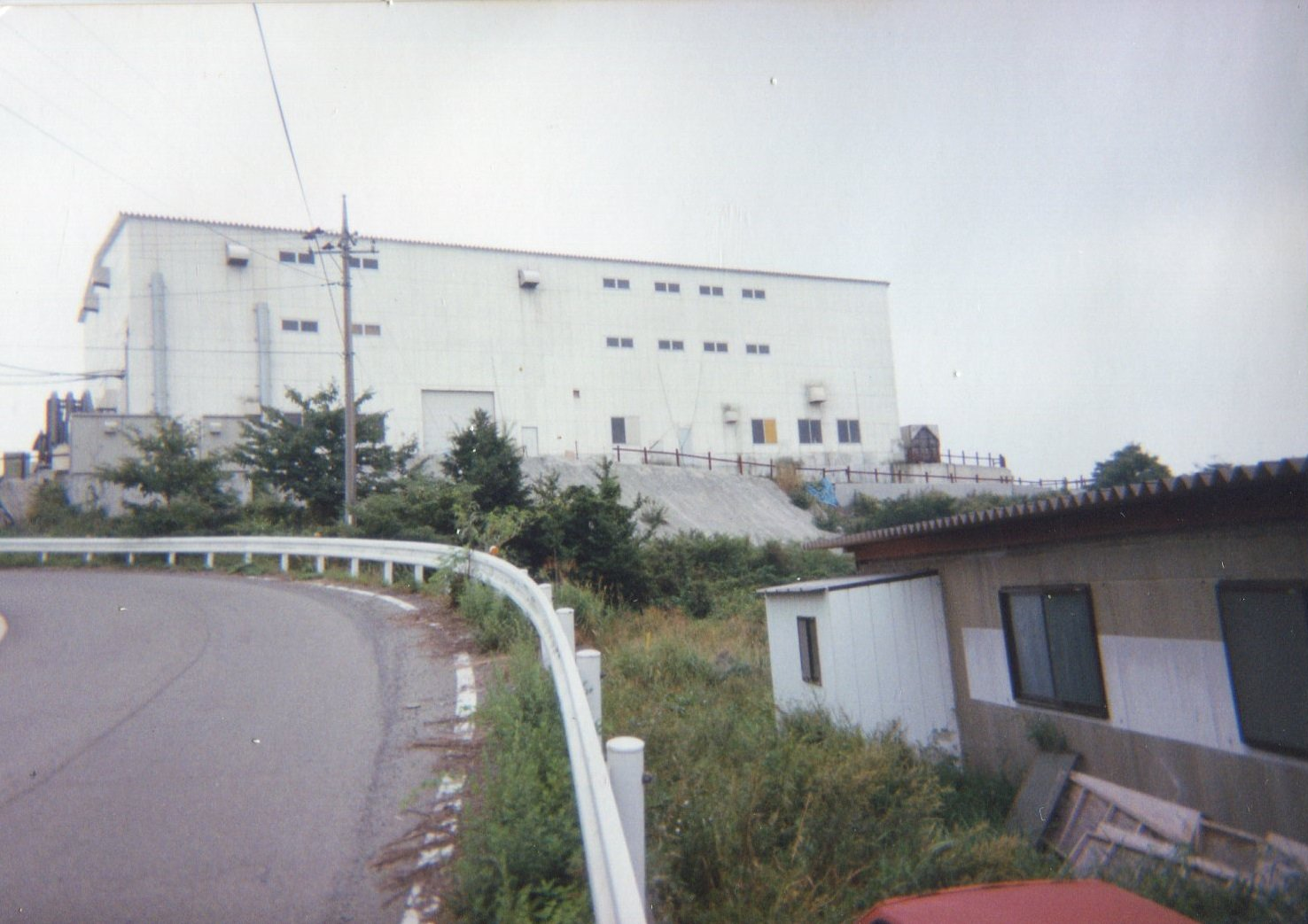
Aum Shinrikyo facility in Kamikuishiki, September 8, 1996

On the morning of 20 March 1995, Aum members released a binary chemical weapon, most closely chemically similar to sarin, in a coordinated attack on five trains in the Tokyo subway system, killing 14 commuters, seriously injuring 54, and affecting 980 more. Some estimates claim as many as 6,000 people were injured by the sarin. It is difficult to obtain exact numbers since many victims are reluctant to come forward.

Prosecutors allege that Asahara was tipped off by an insider about planned police raids on cult facilities and ordered an attack in central Tokyo to divert police attention away from the group. The attack evidently backfired, and police conducted huge simultaneous raids on cult compounds across the country.

Over the next week, the full scale of Aum's activities was revealed for the first time. At the cult's headquarters in Kamikuishiki, on the foot of Mount Fuji, police found explosives, chemical weapons, and a Russian Mi-17-1V military helicopter (4K-15214). While the finding of biological warfare agents such as anthrax and Ebola was reported, those claims appear to have been widely exaggerated. There were stockpiles of chemicals that could be used for producing enough sarin to kill four million people.

Police also found laboratories to manufacture drugs such as LSD, methamphetamine, and a crude form of truth serum, a safe containing millions of U.S. dollars in cash and gold, and cells, many still containing prisoners. During the raids, Aum issued statements claiming that the chemicals were for fertilizers. Over the next six weeks, over 150 cult members were arrested for a variety of offenses. The media were stationed outside Aum's Tokyo headquarters on Komazawa Dori in Aoyama for months after the attack and arrests, waiting for action and to get images of the cult's other members. On 30 March 1995, Takaji Kunimatsu, chief of the National Police Agency, was shot four times near his house in Tokyo and was seriously wounded. While many suspected Aum involvement in the shooting, the Sankei Shimbun reported that Hiroshi Nakamura was suspected of the crime, but nobody had been charged; Nakamura later confessed to the crime.

On 23 April 1995, Hideo Murai, the head of Aum's Ministry of Science, was stabbed to death outside the cult's Tokyo headquarters amidst a crowd of about 100 reporters, in front of cameras. The man responsible, a Korean member of Yamaguchi-gumi, was arrested and eventually convicted of the murder. His motive remains unknown. On the evening of 5 May, two transparent vinyl bags, one on fire, were discovered in a toilet in Tokyo's busy Shinjuku station. Upon examination, it was revealed that it was a hydrogen cyanide device containing sulfuric acid in one bag and sodium cyanide in the other which, had it not been extinguished in time, could have potentially released enough gas into the ventilation system to kill 10,000 commuters. On the 4th and 5 July, battery powered cyanide devices were found at other locations in the Tokyo subway. One had activated but the two chemicals had failed to mix.

During this time, numerous cult members were arrested for various offenses, but arrests of the most senior members on the charge of the subway gassing had not yet taken place. In June, an individual unrelated to Aum had launched a copycat attack by hijacking All Nippon Airways Flight 857, a Boeing 747 bound for Hakodate from Tokyo. The hijacker claimed to be an Aum member in possession of sarin and plastic explosives, but these claims were ultimately found to be false.

Asahara was finally found hiding within a wall of a cult building known as "The 6th Satian" in the Kamikuishiki complex on 16 May and was arrested. On the same day, the cult mailed a parcel bomb to the office of Yukio Aoshima, the governor of Tokyo, blowing off the fingers of his secretary's hand. Asahara was initially charged with 23 counts of murder and 16 other offenses. The trial, dubbed "the trial of the century" by the press, ruled Asahara guilty of masterminding the attack and sentenced him to death. The indictment was appealed unsuccessfully. Several senior members accused of participation, such as Masami Tsuchiya, also received death sentences.

The reasons why a small circle of mostly senior Aum members committed atrocities and the extent of personal involvement by Asahara remain unclear, although several theories have attempted to explain these events. In response to the prosecution's charge that Asahara ordered the subway attacks to distract authorities, the defense maintained that Asahara was not aware of events, pointing to his deteriorating health. Shortly after his arrest, Asahara abandoned his post as the organization's leader, and maintained silence afterward, refusing to communicate even with lawyers and family members.

=== After 1995 ===
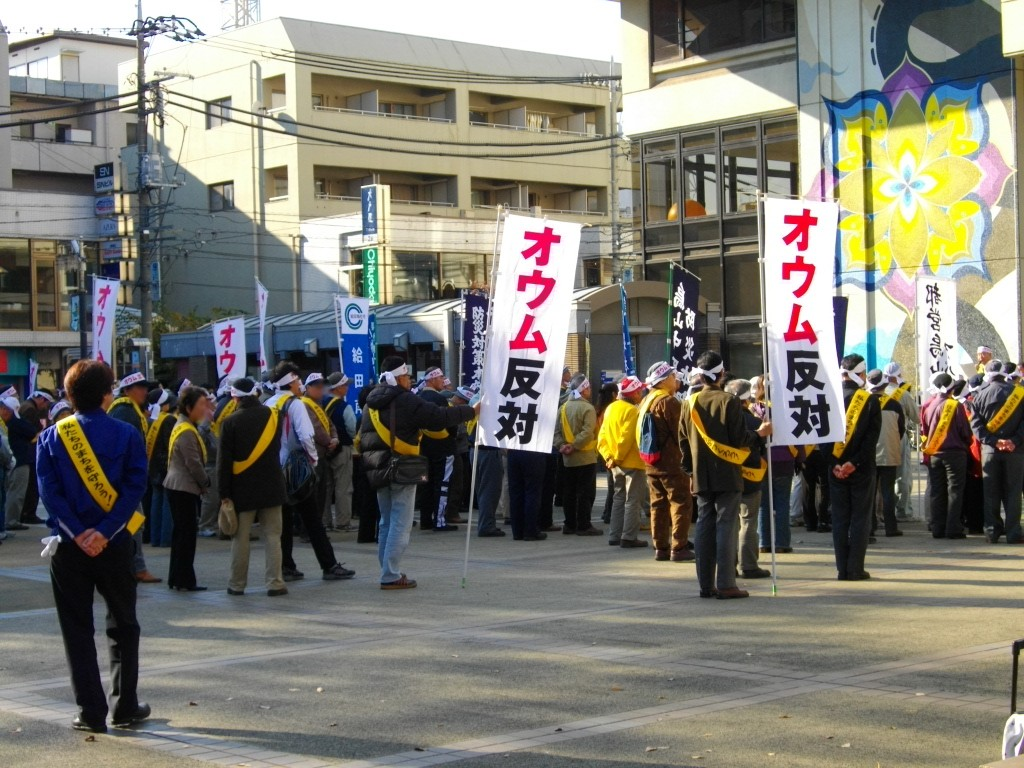
An anti–Aum Shinrikyo protest in Japan, 2009

On 21 June 1995, Asahara acknowledged that in January 1994, he ordered the killing of a sect member, Kotaro Ochida, a pharmacist at an Aum hospital. Ochida, who tried to escape from a sect compound, was held down and strangled by another Aum member who was allegedly told that he too would be killed if he did not strangle Ochida. On 10 October 1995, Aum Shinrikyo was ordered to be stripped of its official status as a "religious legal entity" and was declared bankrupt in early 1996. However, the group continues to operate under the constitutional guarantee of freedom of religion, funded by a successful computer business and donations, and under strict surveillance. Attempts to ban the group altogether under the 1952 Subversive Activities Prevention Law were rejected by the Public Security Examination Commission in January 1997.

The group underwent several transformations in the aftermath of Asahara's arrest and trial. For a brief time, Asahara's two preteen sons officially replaced him as guru. It re-grouped under the new name "Aleph" in February 2000. It announced a change in doctrine: religious texts related to controversial Vajrayana Buddhist doctrines and the Bible were removed. The group apologized to the victims of the sarin gas attack and established a special compensation fund. Provocative publications and activities that alarmed society are no longer published.

Fumihiro Joyu, one of the few senior leaders of the group under Asahara who did not face serious charges, became the official head of the organization in 1999. Kōki Ishii, a legislator who formed an anti-Aum committee in the National Diet in 1999, was murdered in 2002.

For over 15 years, only three fugitives were being actively sought. At 11:50 p.m. on 31 December 2011, Makoto Hirata surrendered himself to the police and was arrested on suspicion of being involved in the 1995 abduction of Kiyoshi Kariya, a non-member who had died during an Aum kidnapping and interrogation. On 3 June 2012, police captured Naoko Kikuchi, the second fugitive, acting on a tip from local residents.

Acting on information from the capture of Kikuchi, including recent photographs showing a modified appearance, the last remaining fugitive, Katsuya Takahashi, was captured on 15 June 2012. He is said to have been the driver in the Tokyo gas attack and was caught in Tokyo, having been on the run for 17 years.

On 6 July 2018, Asahara and six other Aum Shinrikyo members were executed by hanging. Japan's Justice Minister Yōko Kamikawa stated that the crimes "plunged people, not only in Japan but in other countries as well, into deadly fear and shook society to its core." Amnesty International criticized the use of the death penalty in the case. While executions are rare in Japan, they have public support according to surveys. There were 13 members on death row at the time:

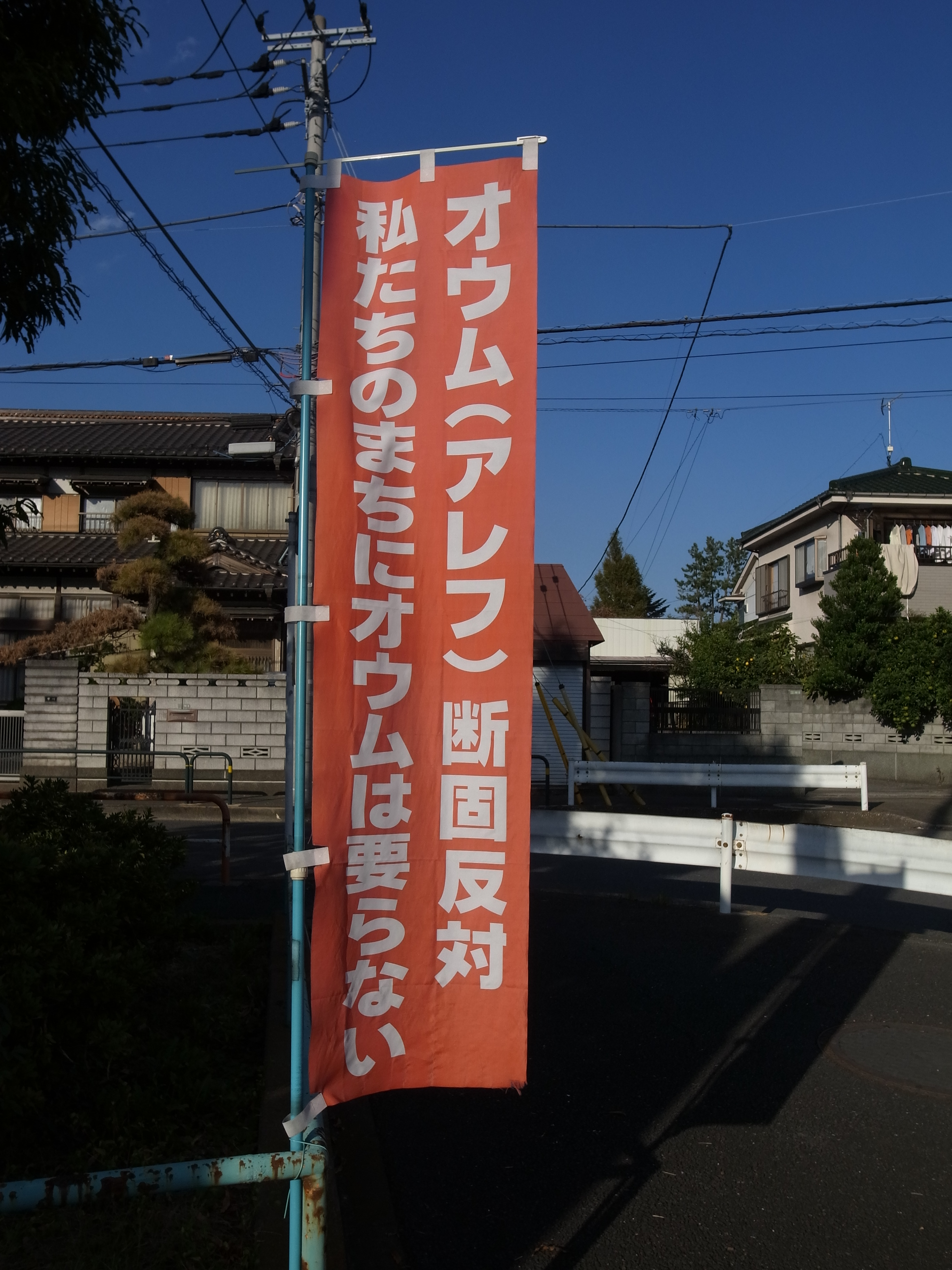
An anti–Aum Shinrikyo banner in 2014

Aum Shinrikyo members executed on 6 July 2018:

- Shoko Asahara, leader of Aum Shinrikyo
- Yoshihiro Inoue, Aum's "head of intelligence" and chief coordinator of the Tokyo subway attack
- Tomomitsu Niimi, the getaway driver for Ikuo Hayashi, one of the perpetrators of the Tokyo subway attack
- Tomomasa Nakagawa, a perpetrator of the Sakamoto family murder
- Kiyohide Hayakawa, Aum's "construction minister", convicted of strangling a young cult member in 1989, suspected of dissidence
- Seiichi Endo, the "head scientist" of Aum Shinrikyo
- Masami Tsuchiya, Aum Shinrikyo's chief chemist and director of the sarin gas manufacturing

The six other Aum Shinrikyo members were executed on 26 July 2018.

- Yasuo Hayashi, a perpetrator of the Tokyo subway attack
- Kenichi Hirose, a perpetrator of the Tokyo subway attack
- Toru Toyoda, a perpetrator of the Tokyo subway attack
- Masato Yokoyama, a perpetrator of the Tokyo subway attack
- Kazuaki Okazaki, a perpetrator of the Sakamoto family murder
- Satoru Hashimoto, a perpetrator of the Sakamoto family murder

Initially, it was expected that Shoko Asahara's ashes would be collected by his youngest daughter according to his will. She urged her relatives and cult members to "put an end to the Aum and stop hating society". The ashes were kept at the detention center for fear of reprisals from other elements of the cult. In 2020 the Tokyo Family Court ruled that the second daughter, who had the "closest" relationship with her father, and who had repeatedly visited her father while he was incarcerated, should receive his hair and remains. On 2 July 2021, the Supreme Court rejected an appeal by the fourth daughter and upheld the ruling of the family court. In 2024 the Tokyo District Court ordered the government to hand over the remains to the second daughter.

== Doctrine ==
Aum Shinrikyo originally started out as a small Nichiren sect, being especially influenced by groups like Soka Gakkai and Nichiren Shōshū. Eventually it grew more syncretic, drawing upon Asahara's interpretations of elements in Early Buddhism and Tibetan tantric practices, as well as Hinduism, early on featuring Shiva prominently as the main image of worship; it also naturalized Christian millenarist ideas, and incorporated the writings of Nostradamus into their teaching. It has however, also been argued that Nichiren Buddhism has always had a Millenialist tendency, such as various Nichirenshugi doctrines, and that the Millenialism of Aum Shinrikyo itself may have Buddhist origins.

Its founder, Shoko Asahara (born Chizuo Matsumoto), claimed that he sought to restore "original Buddhism," and also employed millennialist rhetoric. In 1992, Asahara published a foundational book, declaring himself to be Maitreya, as well as "Christ", and Japan's only fully enlightened master, as well as identifying himself as the "Lamb of God" and Kalki.

Asahara's purported mission was to take upon himself the bad karma of the world, also claiming this could transfer spiritual power to his followers. While some scholars reject Aum Shinrikyo's claims of Buddhist characteristics and affiliations with Japanese Buddhism, other scholars refer to it as an offshoot of Japanese Buddhism, and this was how the movement generally defined and saw itself.

Asahara outlined a doomsday prophecy claiming an imminent nuclear apocalypse as the result of a conspiracy involving Jewish financiers, Freemasons, and general war profiteers. In this scenario, the United States would lead a Western nuclear attack on Japan in 2000 or 2006, and WWIII would start. It was also claimed that this war would be fought with particle beam weapons.

Asahara predicted the gathering at Armageddon would happen in 1997. Kaplan notes that in his lectures, Asahara referred to the United States as "The Beast" from the Book of Revelation, predicting it would be responsible for WWIII. Humanity would end, except for the elite few who joined Aum. Aum's mission was therefore to spread the word of salvation and prepare to survive these End Times.

In the opinion of Daniel A. Metraux, Aum Shinrikyo justified its violence through its own unique interpretation of Buddhist ideas and doctrines, such as the Buddhist concepts of Mappō and Shōbō. Aum claimed that by bringing about the end of the world, they would restore Shōbō. Furthermore, Lifton believes, Asahara "interpreted the Tibetan Buddhist concept of phowa in order to claim that by killing someone contrary to the group's aims, they were preventing them from accumulating bad karma and thus saving them". In Aum's terminology, phowa is spelled "poa" (ポア). Asahara himself said:

For example, let's say there's a person named A who was born accumulating good karma, but then became arrogant, and from then on accumulated bad karma, and by the time he died, he would have accumulated so much bad karma that he would end up in hell. If the accomplished person kills person A, person A will be reborn in heaven. (omitted) Knowing all this, if left alive, A will accumulate evil deeds and fall into hell. At this point, the person decided that it would be better to end A's life and performed a "poa" (a ritual to kill A). What kind of karma has this person accumulated? Is it killing, or has he performed a good deed that will allow him to be reborn into a higher realm? From a purely human, objective perspective, this is killing. However, if we consider the Vajrayana philosophy, this is a noble act of purification. And a wise person—and wisdom is the key here—if a wise person observes this phenomenon, they will see that both the murdered person and the murderer benefited. However, if an uneducated person, an ordinary person, observes this, they will see that "that person is a murderer."

The name "Aum Shinrikyo" (オウム真理教, Ōmu Shinrikyō), usually rendered in English as "Aum Supreme Truth", derives from the Sanskrit syllable Aum, used to represent the universe, followed by the Japanese Shinrikyo (meaning, roughly, "Teaching of Truth") written in kanji. (In Japanese, kanji are often used to write both Sino-xenic and native Japanese words, but only rarely to transcribe direct borrowings from other languages.)

In January 2000, the organization changed its name to "Aleph", a reference to the first letter of the Hebrew alphabet, and it also replaced its logo.

== Subsequent activities ==
According to a June 2005 report by the National Police Agency, Aleph had approximately 1,650 members, of whom 650 lived communally in compounds. The group operated 26 facilities in 17 prefectures, and about 120 residential facilities. An article in the Mainichi Shimbun newspaper on 11 September 2002 showed that the Japanese public still distrusted Aleph, and compounds were usually surrounded by protest banners from local residents.

=== Monitoring ===
In January 2000, the group was placed under surveillance for a period of three years under an anti-Aum law, in which the group was required to submit a list of members and details of assets to the authorities. In the same year, a Russian member was arrested for plotting a bombing attack as part of a plan to rescue Asahara from police custody. The plan was led by Dmitry Sigachev, who was arrested at Primorsky Krai.

In 2001, Russian Aum members had reportedly planned to attack the Tokyo Imperial Palace with explosives in an effort to free Asahara from police custody.

In January 2003, the Public Security Intelligence Agency received permission to extend the surveillance for another three years, as they found evidence which suggested that the group still revered Asahara. According to the Religious News Blog report issued in April 2004, the authorities still considered the group "a threat to society".

On 15 September 2006, Shoko Asahara lost his final appeal against the death penalty. The following day Japanese police raided the offices of Aleph in order to "prevent any illegal activities by cult members in response to the confirmation of Asahara's death sentence". Thirteen cult members were eventually sentenced to death.

=== Split ===
On 8 March 2007, Fumihiro Joyu, former Aum Shinrikyo spokesman and head of Aum's Moscow operation, formally announced a long-expected split. Joyu's group, called Hikari no Wa ("The Circle of Light"), claims to be committed to uniting science and religion and creating "the new science of the human mind", having previously aimed to move the group away from its criminal history and toward its spiritual roots.

In April 2011, the Public Security Intelligence Agency stated that Aum had about 1,500 members. In July 2011, the cult reported its membership as 1,030. The group was reportedly active in trying to recruit new members via social media and proselytizing on college campuses.

Japan's Public Security Examination Commission announced in January 2015 that Aum Shinrikyo's two spinoffs would remain under surveillance for three more years starting 1 February 2015.

=== Admirers ===
In 2014, The Japan Times alleged that "good looks and commitment to a cause", demonstrated by Aleph, "inspire a new generation of admirers". Dissatisfaction with society and low degrees of success in life make them "identify with the cult" and "adore the cultists as if they were pop idols".

=== 2013 investigation and media coverage ===
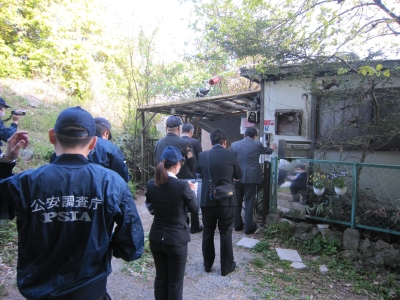
PSIA officers conduct a surprise inspection on a suspected Aleph building in 2013.

Sometime after April 2013, the Public Security Intelligence Agency took a photograph inside of Aleph's facilities. In this photograph, a bundle of papers is pierced with a knife on an altar-like object. The papers included photographs of PSIA employees and directors, police officers, and lawyer Taro Takimoto, who helped followers leave Aum Shinrikyo. At least at this point in time, Aleph still displayed portraits of Shoko Asahara and demanded followers' dependence using videos of Asahara.

=== 2016 Montenegro crackdown ===
In March 2016, Montenegro expelled 58 foreigners suspected of being associated with Aum Shinrikyo. Four of them were from Japan; 43 were from Russia, seven from Belarus, three from Ukraine, and one from Uzbekistan.

=== 2016 Russian crackdown ===
On 5 April 2016, the Investigative Committee of Russia announced it opened a criminal case against Aum Shinrikyo followers and that its investigators, along with Federal Security Service (FSB) forces, were conducting raids in Moscow and Saint Petersburg to find them and confiscate literature, religious items and electronic information. On 20 September 2016, the Russian government banned Aum Shinrikyo from the country, declaring it a terrorist organization.

=== 2017 Aleph raids ===
In November 2017, Japanese police raided five offices of Aleph in an investigation into the group's recruiting practices after a woman paid tens of thousands of yen for study sessions.

=== 2019 Tokyo car attack ===
On 1 January 2019, in Tokyo, Aum sympathizer Kazuhiro Kusakabe told authorities he intentionally rammed into pedestrians crowded into narrow Takeshita Street in Harajuku district as a terrorist attack in "retaliation for an execution". It remains unclear whether he was referencing the 2018 executions of Aum Shinrikyo doomsday cult members directly or making a broader statement. The attack, on New Year's Day, left eight injured. A ninth person was also directly injured by the driver.

== Books from and about Aum ==
- Asahara, Shōkō (1988). Supreme Initiation: An Empirical Spiritual Science for the Supreme Truth. New York: Aum USA. ISBN 0-945638-00-0.

Highlights the main stages of Yogic and Buddhist practice, comparing Yoga-sutra system by Patanjali and the Eightfold Noble Path from Buddhist tradition.

- Asahara, Shōkō (March 1993). Beyond Life and Death. New York: Aum USA. ISBN 4-87142-072-8.

Focuses on the process of Kundalini-Yoga, one of the stages in Aum's practice.

- Asahara, Shōkō (1995). Disaster Approaches the Land of the Rising Sun: Shoko Asahara's Apocalyptic Predictions. Shizuoka, Japan: Aum Publishing Co.

A controversial book, later removed by Aum leadership, speaks about the possible destruction of Japan.

- Baffelli, Erica (2010). Preface. Il Caso Aum Shinrikyô: Società, Religione e Terrorismo nel Giappone Contemporaneo [The Case of Aum Shinrikyo: Society, Religion, and Terrorism in Contemporary Japan]. By Bonino, Stefano (in Italian). Chieti, Italy: Solfanelli. ISBN 978-88-89756-88-1.
- Hayashi, Ikuo (1998). Aum to Watakushi [Aum and I] (in Japanese). Tokyo, Japan: Bungei Shunju.

Book about personal experiences by former Aum member.

- "Global Proliferation of Weapons of Mass Destruction: A Case Study on the Aum Shinrikyo". [USA] Senate Government Affairs Permanent Subcommittee on Investigations. 31 October 1995.
- Reader, Ian (2000). Religious violence in contemporary Japan: the case of Aum Shinrikyō. Honolulu, HI: University of Hawaii Press. ISBN 978-0824823405.

== Documentary movies ==
A (1998) is a Japanese documentary film about the cult following the arrest of its leaders. The director, Tatsuya Mori, released the sequel A2 in 2001, which examined the competing factions of the sect (renamed Aleph), during the trial of their leader Shoko Asahara and his associates.

AUM: The Cult at the End of the World is a 2023 documentary film directed by Ben Braun and Chiaki Yanagimoto, based on the book The Cult at the End of the World by David E. Kaplan and Andrew Marshall.

== See also ==
- List of Buddha claimants
- List of dates predicted for apocalyptic events
- List of new religious movements
- Yoshihiro Yasuda, a lawyer who represented Shoko Asahara
- Masaki Kito, a lawyer who represents Aum victims
- Buddhism and violence
- Guhyasamāja Tantra
