= Yoshiyuki Kōno (victim) =

Survivor of the Matsumoto sarin attack

Yoshiyuki Kōno (河野 義行, born February 3, 1950) is a survivor of the Matsumoto incident, a sarin attack that killed eight people and sickened many more in Matsumoto, Japan, on the evening of June 27, 1994 and the following morning.

== Police suspicion and media attention ==
Kōno, a machinery salesman, lived next-door to the site where Aum Shinrikyo members parked the customised vehicle carrying the deadly nerve agent. Despite the fact that his wife, Sumiko, was one of the people who had been gassed and was comatose at the time, the investigating police considered Kōno a prime suspect in the crime, considering his property to have been the point of origin of the sarin. Further, it was discovered that Kōno had twenty chemicals stored at his residence, which he had purchased for photo processing and pottery, along with pesticides. Despite the fact that sarin could not be synthesised from any combination of these chemicals, and Kōno lacked any of the qualifications or considerable knowledge of and experience in chemistry necessary to produce it, historian Keiichi Tsuneishi erroneously claimed in The Asahi Shimbun (the second most circulated newspaper out of the five national newspapers in Japan) that it was possible to synthesise the nerve agent from organophosphorus pesticides. Due to a deliberate leak from the local Nagano police force, he was subjected to a "trial by media" where the Japanese media treated Kōno as the perpetrator, dubbing him the "Poison Gas Man", causing him to receive hate mail and death threats.

== Vindication ==
After the much larger attack on the Tokyo subway in 1995, Kōno was cleared of blame and Aum Shinrikyo was deemed responsible. The head of National Public Safety Commission Hiromu Nonaka and media publicly apologised to Kōno. However, Nagano police did not directly apologise to Kōno until 2002.

== Later activism ==
Kōno later participated in many media events in defence of Aum, arguing that since the time he was wrongly accused in connection to the incident, he realised how vulnerable innocent victims are to media hate campaigns. Pointing to his own personal experience with the media industry and police, he drew parallels to innocent Aum members who suffered public alienation and unceremonious intrusion into their private life justified mostly by fears generated by the sensationalistic media rather than any proof of actual guilt.

Together with Yoshihiro Yasuda, a veteran attorney arrested during his defence of Aum's founder Shoko Asahara, he also campaigned against the death penalty and delivered speeches and lectures explaining the impact of Japan's judicial system on suspects and wrongly accused, as well as the social impact on relatives and associates.

== Family ==
Kōno's wife Sumiko, who had previously been an electronic organ teacher, remained unconscious until her death on August 5, 2008 at the age of 60, survived by her husband and their son and two daughters.
