= Sakamoto family murders =

1989 triple murder in Japan

Sakamoto Family Murder
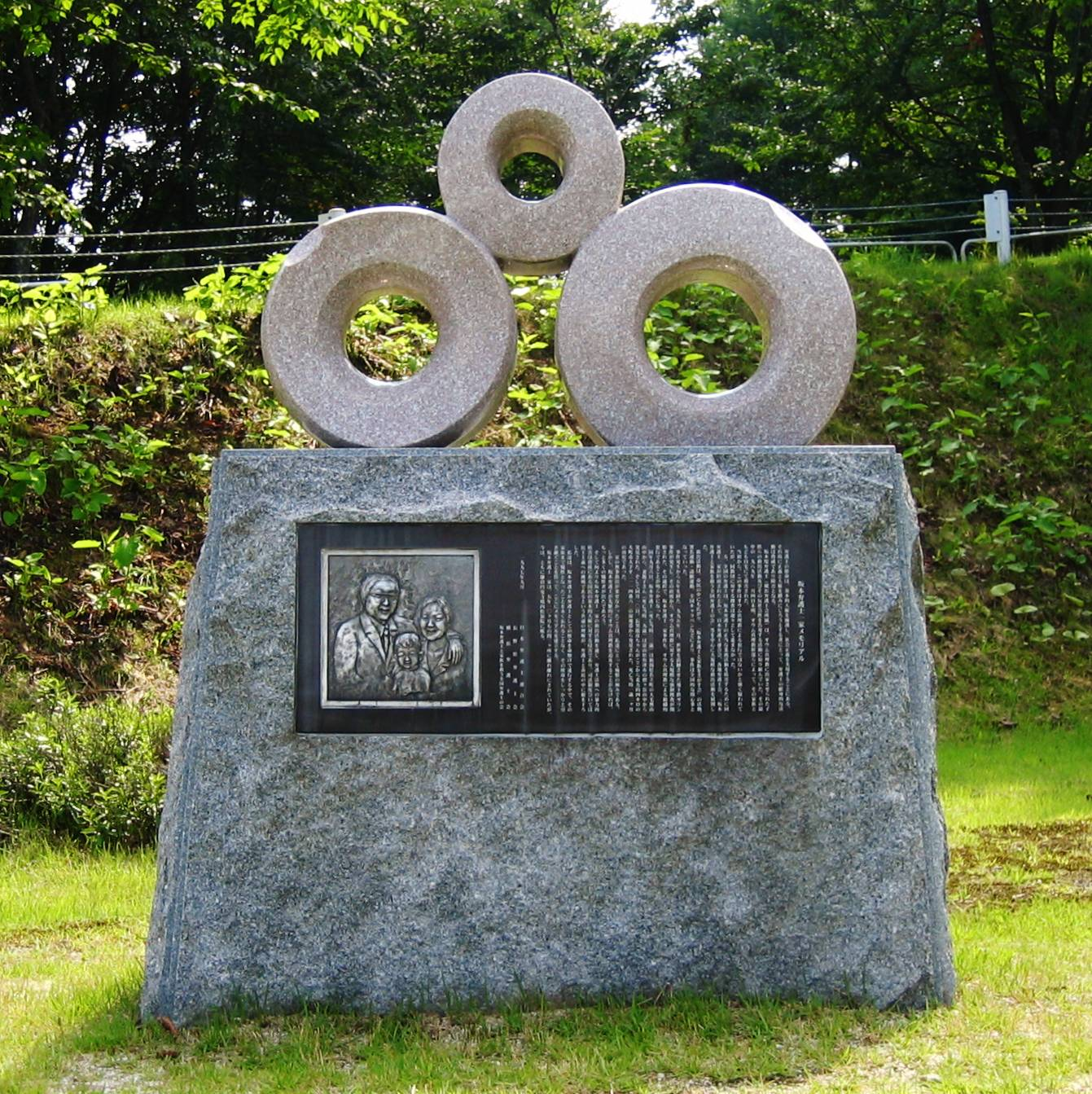
- Sakamoto family cenotaph
- Location: Isogo-ku, Yokohama, Japan
- Date: November 5, 1989; 3:07 a.m. – 3:20 a.m.
- Target: Sakamoto family (3 people)
- Attack type: Mass murder, home invasion
- Weapons: Hammer, potassium chloride syringes
- Deaths: 3
- Victims: Tsutsumi Sakamoto, 33; Satoko Sakamoto, 29; Tatsuhiko Sakamoto, 14 months
- Perpetrator: Aum Shinrikyo members
- Motive: To prevent Sakamoto from suing Aum Shinrikyo

Tsutsumi Sakamoto (right), wife Satoko (left) and son Tatsuhiko (center)

On November 5, 1989, Tsutsumi Sakamoto (坂本 堤, Sakamoto Tsutsumi; April 6, 1956 – November 5, 1989), a lawyer working on a class action lawsuit against Aum Shinrikyo, a doomsday cult in Japan, was murdered, along with his wife Satoko and his son Tatsuhiko, by perpetrators who broke into his apartment. Six years later, following the 1995 attack on the Tokyo subway, the murderers were uncovered and it was established that the murderers had been members of Aum Shinrikyo at the time of the crime.

== Tsutsumi Sakamoto ==
Tsutsumi was born in Yokosuka, Kanagawa. After graduating from Yokosuka High School, he entered Tokyo University and graduated in law. He worked as a law clerk until he passed the bar exam in 1984 at age 27. He was a member of the Yokohama Bar Association. From 1987 he worked as a lawyer at Yokohama Law Offices.

At the time of his murder, Sakamoto was known as an anti-cult lawyer. He had previously successfully led a class-action suit against the Unification Church on behalf of relatives of Unification Church members. In the suit the plaintiffs sued for assets transferred to the group, and for harm inflicted by worsened family relationships. A public relations campaign in which protesters demanded public attention to their cause was instrumental to Sakamoto's plan, and the Unification Church suffered a serious financial blow.

By organizing a similar anti-Aum public relations campaign, Sakamoto apparently sought to demonstrate that Aum members, similar to members of the Unification Church, did not join the group voluntarily but were lured in by deception and were probably being held against their will by threats and manipulations. Furthermore, religious items were being sold at prices far greater than their market value, draining money out of the households of members (in a practice called spiritual sales). If a judgment was handed down in his clients' favor, Aum could be bankrupted, thus greatly weakening or destroying the group.

In 1988, in order to pursue the class action suit, Sakamoto initiated the establishment of Aum Shinrikyo Higai Taisaku Bengodan ("Coalition of Help for those affected by Aum Shinrikyo"). This was later renamed: Aum Shinrikyo Higaisha-no-kai or "Aum Shinrikyo Victims' Association". The group still operated under this title as of 2006.

After Sakamoto's disappearance, lawyer Taro Takimoto took over most of his anti-Aum Shinrikyo legal activities.

== Circumstances of the murder ==
In October 1989, Tokyo Broadcasting System Television (TBS) taped an interview with Sakamoto regarding his anti-Aum efforts. However, the network secretly showed a video of the interview to Aum members without Sakamoto's knowledge, intentionally breaking its protection of sources. Aum officials then pressured TBS to cancel the planned broadcast of the interview.

Several days later, on November 3, 1989, several Aum Shinrikyo members, including Hideo Murai, chief scientist, Satoro Hashimoto, a martial arts master, Tomomasa Nakagawa and Kazuaki Okazaki drove to Yokohama, where Sakamoto lived. They carried a pouch with 14 hypodermic needles and a supply of potassium chloride. According to court testimony provided by the perpetrators later, they planned to use the chemical substance to kidnap Sakamoto from Yokohama's Shinkansen train station, but, contrary to expectations, he did not show up—it was a holiday (Bunka no hi, or "Culture Day"), so he slept in with his family at home.

At 3 a.m. on November 5, the group entered Sakamoto's apartment through an unlocked door. Tsutsumi Sakamoto was struck on the head with a hammer, injected with potassium chloride, and strangled. His wife, Satoko Sakamoto (坂本都子 Sakamoto Satoko, 29 years old) was beaten and injected with potassium chloride. Their infant son Tatsuhiko Sakamoto (坂本竜彦 Sakamoto Tatsuhiko, 14 months old) was injected with the potassium chloride and then his face was covered with a cloth. The family's remains were placed in metal drums and hidden in three separate rural areas in three different prefectures (Tsutsumi in Niigata, Satoko in Toyama, and Tatsuhiko in Nagano) so that in case the bodies were uncovered, police might not link the three incidents. Their bed sheets were burned and the tools were dropped in the ocean. The victims' teeth were smashed to frustrate identification. Their bodies were not found until the perpetrators revealed the locations after they were captured in connection with the 1995 Tokyo subway attack. By the time police searched the areas in which the victims were placed, their bodies were reduced to bones.

== Aftermath ==
As reported by NHK in 2015, the Tokyo metropolitan police had received a tip that an Aum member was involved in the murder, and in 1991 launched an investigation into the cult's facilities in the city. However, the investigation was shut down after two months due to the murder having been committed in Yokohama, outside of the jurisdiction of the Tokyo police.

Evidence of Aum Shinrikyo's involvement in the murders was uncovered six years after the murder, after a number of senior followers were arrested on other charges, most notably in connection with the Tokyo subway attack. All of those implicated in the Sakamoto murders received death sentences. The court found that the murder was committed by order of the group's founder, Shoko Asahara, although not all of the perpetrators testified to this effect, and Asahara denied involvement. Asahara's legal team claims that blaming him is an attempt to shift personal responsibility to a higher authority.

After the culpability of Tokyo Broadcasting System in the murders was uncovered, the network was swamped with complaints and eventually the company's president resigned.

== Trial, conviction, and sentencing of the perpetrators ==
Following the Tokyo attacks, police charged Aum members Hideo Murai, Tomomasa Nakagawa, Kazuaki Okazaki, and Satoro Hashimoto with the murder of the Sakamoto family. Okazaki's trial was the shortest, as he pleaded guilty to all charges. Murai never made it to trial, as he was stabbed to death by a yakuza-affiliated Zainichi Korean assassin in April 1995 as he was being transferred by police. Okazaki was found guilty in October 1998. In 2000, the last two perpetrators, Nakagawa and Hashimoto, were convicted of the murders. On July 25, 2000, Okazaki, Nakagawa, and Hashimoto were sentenced to death. On 28 July 2000, Kiyohide Hayakawa was sentenced to death for his role in the murder.

In 2017, Nakagawa published a memoir from prison in which he renounced his Aum beliefs, apologized to the families of his victims, and referred to Aum leader Shoko Asahara as a "criminal".

Following the 2017 death of Kim Jong-nam (the half-brother of North Korean leader Kim Jong-un), Nakagawa wrote a letter from prison in which he expressed his belief that Kim Jong-nam had died from VX poisoning, quantities of which Aum Shinrikyo had produced and used in the 1990s.

Nakagawa was executed on July 6, 2018, while Okazaki and Hashimoto were executed on July 26, 2018 (18 years and one day after being sentenced).

== See also ==
- Aum Shinrikyo
- Capital punishment in Japan
- List of executions in Japan
- List of solved missing person cases: 1950–1999
