= Hideo Murai =

Japanese murderer and member of Aum Shinrikyo

Hideo Murai (村井 秀夫 Murai Hideo; December 5, 1958 – April 23, 1995) was a Japanese criminal and member of the Aum Shinrikyo cult and one of the perpetrators responsible for the Sakamoto family murder. He also helped plan the Tokyo subway sarin attack. Murai held a doctorate in astrophysics. He was reportedly the number three person in the Aum leadership, after Shoko Asahara and Kiyohide Hayakawa. He headed Aum Shinrikyo's Ministry of Science and Technology.

== Death ==
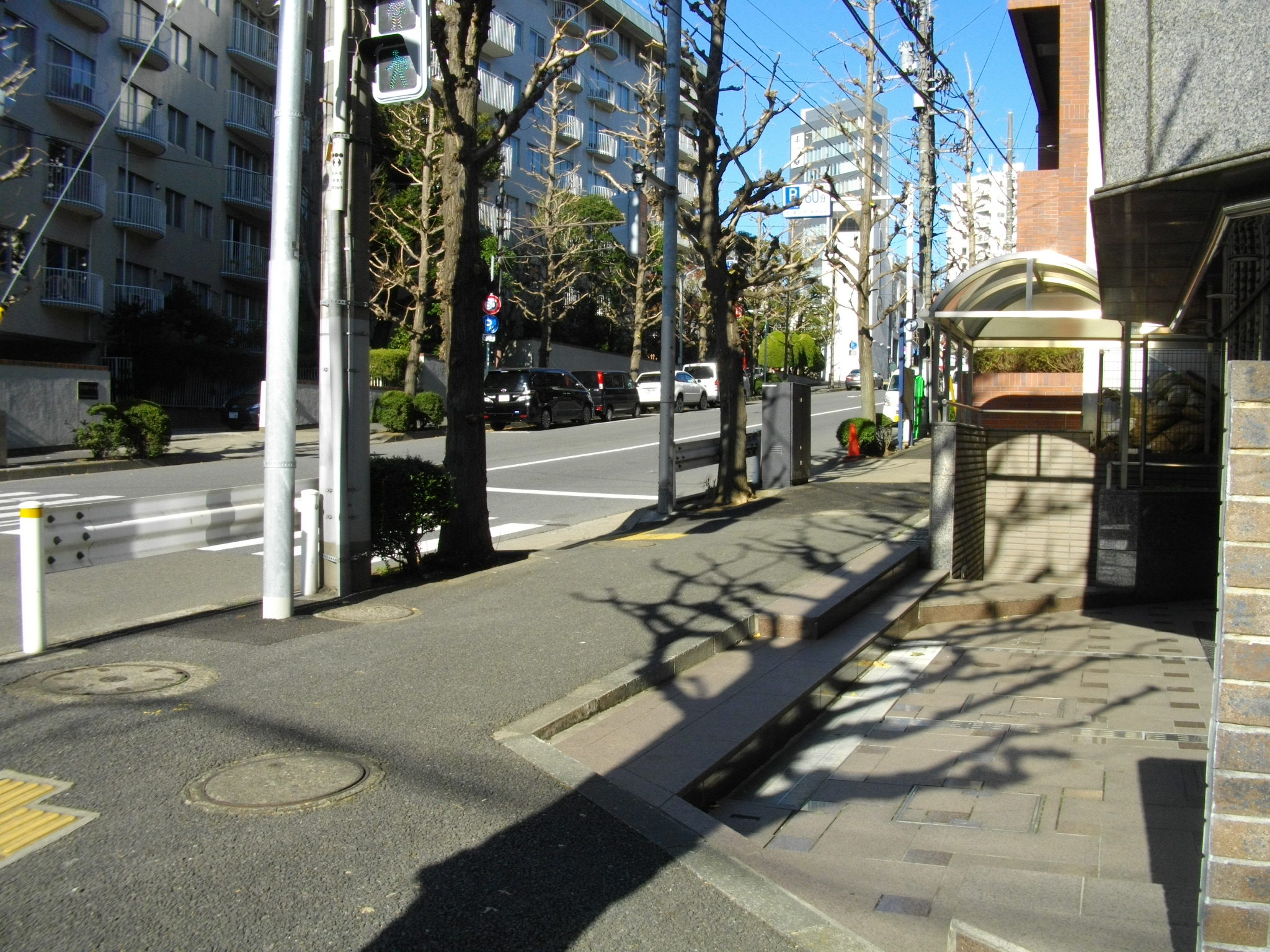
Spot of assassination of Hideo Murai

Murai was mortally wounded when an ethnic Korean man named Hiroyuki Jo (徐裕行 Jo Hiroyuki), a member of the Yamaguchi-gumi (the largest organized crime yakuza group in Japan), stabbed Murai repeatedly, in the presence of 10 police officers and about a hundred reporters recording the events and broadcasting them live.

His attacker did not attempt to flee and was peacefully arrested on the spot. Murai died in an ambulance. Charges that Kenji Kamimine (上峯 憲司), a former leader of Hane-gumi, ordered Jo to kill Murai were dismissed by the Tokyo High Court. Jo had claimed Kenji had ordered him to kill any Aum Shinrikyo leaders that he could. It is believed that this was done out of fear of the yakuza's connections to the cult being made public.

Jo was sentenced to 12 years in prison for the murder.
