= Masami Tsuchiya (Aum Shinrikyo) =

Aum Shinrikyo senior member and terrorist

- 土谷 正実
- Born: 6 January 1965; Chiyoda, Tokyo, Japan
- Died: 6 July 2018 (aged 53); Tokyo Detention House, Tokyo, Japan
- Education: University of Tsukuba
- Known for: Aum Shinrikyo membership and numerous attacks and murders
- Status: Executed by hanging
- Convictions: Mass murder Terrorism
- Penalty: Death

Masami Tsuchiya (土谷 正実, Tsuchiya Masami; 6 January 1965 – 6 July 2018) was a Japanese convicted terrorist and senior member of Aum Shinrikyo, responsible for the deaths of a combined 19 people and for the production of sarin, VX nerve agent, PCP, and LSD. He served in Aum's "Ministry of Health". Prosecutors described him as "the second most important figure involved in the gas attacks by the Aum Shinrikyo cult" after Aum leader Shoko Asahara himself.

== Biography ==
Masami was a native of Chiyoda, Tokyo. His early childhood was filled with sensations of deja vu that he did not understand and would never get a satisfactory answer when he would ask about them. He also wanted to make sense of religious feelings. He planned to go to the Himalayas, but he then felt this was unrealistic, so he went to college. In the summer of 1986, his girlfriend ended their relationship. He then cut himself with a knife from his shoulder and his hip. He tried to make sense of this experience.

Tsuchiya's first encounter with Aum Shinrikyo was when a friend took him to a Japanese meditation hall. Tsuchiya joined Aum Shinrikyo in the summer of 1991 after running away from his parents who had confined him to their home after he started skipping college in June 1990. He took refuge at an Aum dojo and became a monk on September 5, 1991. Tsuchiya had a master's degree in physical chemistry and organic chemistry.

Tsuchiya was notably loyal to Asahara, describing himself as a "direct disciple of the guru", and referring to Asahara as sonshi (尊師, "honorable master").

== Trial and execution ==
Tsuchiya was charged with seven counts: the 1995 Tokyo subway sarin attack that killed 12 people; the June 1994 sarin attack in Matsumoto, Nagano, that killed seven; three VX gas attacks in 1994 and 1995 that killed one; production of PCP; and harboring Aum fugitives. During the trials, Tsuchiya was notably defiant, insulting the prosecutors and the gallery, and showing loyalty to Asahara.

In January 2004, the Tokyo District Court found Tsuchiya guilty of all charges except for harboring Aum fugitives and sentenced him to death. The presiding judge stated that although Tsuchiya was not directly involved in the attacks, he deserved to die for his "sheer evil". The Tokyo High Court upheld the sentence in August 2006, and the Supreme Court affirmed the ruling in February 2011, concluding that Tsuchiya had played a decisive role in the 1995 subway attack. In response, Tsuchiya said, "Natural result. I wanted to think about what I could do with a lifelong apology."

On 6 July 2018, Tsuchiya was executed along with Asahara and five other cult members.

== See also ==
- Capital punishment in Japan
- List of executions in Japan
