= Shoko Asahara =

Founder of Aum Shinrikyo (1955–2018)

- Asahara in 1992
- Born: Chizuo Matsumoto; March 2, 1955; Yatsushiro, Kumamoto, Japan
- Died: July 6, 2018 (aged 63); Tokyo Detention House, Tokyo, Japan
- Occupation: Cult leader
- Known for: Founder of Aum Shinrikyo; Perpetrating the 1995 Tokyo subway sarin attack
- Political party: Shinri Party
- Spouse: Tomoko Matsumoto (took the name "Akari Matsumoto" after her release from prison)
- Children: 12
- Status: Executed by hanging
- Convictions: Mass murder Terrorism
- Penalty: Death

Details
- Date apprehended: May 16, 1995

Supreme Leader of the Aum Shinrikyo
- In office August 25, 1989 – May 15, 1995
- Preceded by: Religion founded
- Succeeded by: After his execution, no successor of the Supreme Leader of the Aum Shinrikyo was elected

President of the Shinri Country
- In office June 20, 1994 – May 16, 1995
- Prime Minister: Kouichi Ishikawa
- Supreme Leader: Himself as Leader of Aum Shinrikyo
- Preceded by: Position established
- Succeeded by: Position abolished

Chairman of the Shinri Party
- In office August 16, 1989 – July 6, 2018; Interim: 1990 — July 6, 2018
- Preceded by: Party founded
- Succeeded by: Party dissolved Party dissolved after the execution of Asa

Shoko Asahara (麻原 彰晃, Asahara Shōkō; March 2, 1955 – July 6, 2018), born as Chizuo Matsumoto (松本 智津夫, Matsumoto Chizuo), was a Japanese cult leader and domestic terrorist who founded and led the doomsday cult known as Aum Shinrikyo. He was convicted of masterminding the 1995 sarin gas attack on the Tokyo subway which killed 14 people and injured thousands more, and was involved in several other assassinations and terrorist attacks. Asahara was sentenced to death in 2004, and his final appeal failed in 2011. In June 2012, his execution was postponed due to further arrests of Aum members. He was executed along with other senior members of Aum Shinrikyo on July 6, 2018.

== Early life ==
Chizuo Matsumoto was born on March 2, 1955, the fourth son of a large, poor family of tatami-mat-makers in Kumamoto Prefecture. He had infantile glaucoma from birth, which made him lose all sight in his left eye and go partially blind in his right eye at a young age. He was enrolled in a school for the blind when he was 6 years old, since he could not continue the family trade. He never lived with his family again.

Matsumoto discovered a way to earn money by directing other children to a candy store, and as he was the only student in the school still capable of having some vision, this led to him becoming somewhat well-liked. However, he was also known to be a bully, taking advantage of the other students by beating and extorting money from them. During his adolescence, Matsumoto developed a fantasy about ruling a kingdom of robots with total power, and confided in his schoolmates about his aspiration to become Prime Minister of Japan.

He graduated in 1973 and applied to the Faculty of Law of the University of Tokyo, but was rejected. He then turned to the study of acupuncture and traditional Chinese medicine, which were common careers for the blind in Japan, and he established a Chinese medicine shop outside Tokyo. Asahara married the following year and eventually fathered six children, the eldest of whom was born in 1978. In 1981, Matsumoto was convicted of practicing pharmacy without a license and selling unregulated drugs, for which he was fined ¥200,000, equivalent to about ¥270,000 in 2023.

Matsumoto's interest in religion started at this time. Having been recently married, he worked to support his large and growing family. He dedicated his free time to the study of religious concepts, starting with Chinese astrology and Taoism. Later, Matsumoto practiced Western esotericism, yoga, meditation, esoteric Buddhism, and esoteric Christianity. Matsumoto let his hair and beard grow and adopted the name Shoko Asahara.

Starting in 1984, Asahara made several pilgrimages to India, where he met the 14th Dalai Lama. Asahara later claimed to his followers that he managed to achieve enlightenment, met Shiva, and was given a "special mission" to preach "real Buddhism" in Japan. The Dalai Lama later distanced himself from Asahara and said that he had met "a strange Japanese man", but denied having any significant relationship with him. Asahara returned to Japan in 1987 and assumed the title "sonshi" (尊師, lit. "guru") before stating that he had mastered meditation to such an extent that he could lift himself with his mind. He promoted this achievement with pamphlets produced by his own publishing company, but outside a few Japanese periodicals with an occult subject, little publicity was achieved.

== Aum Shinrikyo ==
=== Establishment ===
Aum Shinrikyo (Japanese: オウム真理教, Hepburn: Oumu Shinrikyō; literally 'Supreme Truth'), later named Aleph (アレフ, Arefu), was founded by Asahara in his one-bedroom apartment in Tokyo's Shibuya ward in 1987, starting off as a yoga and meditation class known as Oumu Shinsen no Kai (オウム神仙の会, "Aum Immortal Mountain Wizard Association"). It steadily grew in the following years. It gained official status as a religious organization in 1989 and attracted a considerable number of graduates from Japan's elite universities, being dubbed a "religion for the elite".

=== Early activities ===
Although Aum was considered controversial in Japan, it was not initially associated with serious crimes until Asahara became obsessed with Biblical prophecies. Aum's public relations activities included publishing comics and animated cartoons that attempted to tie its religious ideas to popular anime and manga themes, including space missions, powerful weapons, world conspiracies, and the quest for ultimate truth. Aum published several magazines including Vajrayana Sacca and Enjoy Happiness, adopting a somewhat missionary attitude.

Isaac Asimov's science fiction Foundation Trilogy was referenced "depicting as it does an elite group of spiritually evolved scientists forced to go underground during an age of barbarism so as to prepare themselves for the moment...when they will emerge to rebuild civilization". It has been posited that Aum's publications used Christian and Buddhist ideas to impress what he considered to be the more shrewd and educated Japanese who were not attracted to boring, purely traditional sermons.

Advertising and recruitment activities, dubbed the "Aum Salvation plan", included claims of curing physical illnesses with health improvement techniques, realizing life goals by improving intelligence and positive thinking, and concentrating on what was important at the expense of leisure. This was to be accomplished by practicing ancient teachings, accurately translated from original Pali sutras. These efforts resulted in Aum being able to recruit a variety of people ranging from bureaucrats to personnel from the Japanese Self-Defense Forces and the Tokyo Metropolitan Police. Authors David Kaplan and Andrew Marshall, in their 1996 book, The Cult at the End of the World, claim that initiation rituals often involved the use of hallucinogens, such as LSD. Religious practices often involved extremely ascetic practices claimed to be "yoga". These included everything from renunciants being hung upside down to being given shock therapy.

In the late-1980s, the cult started attracting controversy with accusations of deception of recruits, holding cult members against their will, forcing members to donate money and murdering a cult member who tried to leave in February 1989. Kaplan and Marshall alleged in their book that Aum was also connected with such activities as extortion. The group, authors report, "commonly took patients into its hospitals and then forced them to pay exorbitant medical bills".

=== Sakamoto family murder ===
In October 1989, Tokyo Broadcasting System Television (TBS) taped an interview with 33-year-old Tsutsumi Sakamoto, a lawyer working on a class action lawsuit against Aum Shinrikyo, regarding his anti-Aum efforts. However, the network secretly showed a video of the interview to Aum members without Sakamoto's knowledge, intentionally breaking its protection of sources. Aum officials then pressured TBS to cancel the planned broadcast of the interview. Several days later, on November 3, 1989, several Aum Shinrikyo members, including Hideo Murai, chief scientist, Satoro Hashimoto, a martial arts master, Tomomasa Nakagawa and Kazuaki Okazaki drove to Yokohama, where Sakamoto lived. They carried a pouch with fourteen hypodermic needles and a supply of potassium chloride. According to court testimony provided by the perpetrators later, they planned to use the chemical substance to kidnap Sakamoto from Yokohama's Shinkansen train station, but, contrary to expectations, he did not show up—it was a holiday (Bunka no hi, or "Culture Day"), so he slept in with his family at home.

At 3 am on November 5, the group entered Sakamoto's apartment through an unlocked door. Tsutsumi Sakamoto was struck on the head with a hammer, injected with potassium chloride, and strangled. His 29-year-old wife, Satoko Sakamoto (坂本都子 Sakamoto Satoko) was beaten and injected with potassium chloride. Their 14-month-old infant son Tatsuhiko Sakamoto (坂本竜彦 Sakamoto Tatsuhiko) was injected with the potassium chloride and then his face was covered with a cloth. The family's remains were placed in metal drums and hidden in three separate rural areas in three different prefectures (Tsutsumi in Niigata, Satoko in Toyama, and Tatsuhiko in Nagano) so that in case the bodies were uncovered, police might not link the three incidents.

Their bed sheets were burned and the tools were dropped in the ocean. The victims' teeth were smashed to prevent identification. Their bodies were not found until the perpetrators revealed the locations after they were captured in connection with the 1995 Tokyo subway attack. By the time police searched the areas in which the victims were placed, their bodies were reduced to bones. TBS kept the showing of the video secret until March 25, 1996. This led to strong criticism that it contributed to the murder.

=== Matsumoto sarin attack ===
On the night of June 27, 1994, the cult carried out a chemical weapons attack against civilians when they released sarin in the central Japanese city of Matsumoto, Nagano. When carrying out the attack, Aum Shinrikyo had two goals; to attack three judges who were expected to rule against the cult in a lawsuit concerning a real estate dispute, and to test the efficacy of its sarin—which the cult was manufacturing at one of its facilities—as a weapon of mass murder. Residents of Matsumoto had also angered Asahara by vigorously opposing his plan to set up an office and factory in the city's southern area. Opponents of the plan gathered 140,000 signatures on an anti-Aum petition, equivalent to 70 percent of Matsumoto's population at the time.

Aum's original plan to release the aerosol into the Matsumoto courthouse was altered when the cult members arrived in the city after the courthouse had closed. They decided to instead target a three-story apartment building where the city's judges resided. At 10:40 pm, members of Aum used a converted refrigerator truck to release a cloud of sarin which floated near the home of the judges. The truck's cargo space held "a heating contraption that had been specifically designed to turn "twelve litres of liquid sarin into an aerosol, and fans to diffuse the aerosol into the neighbourhood".

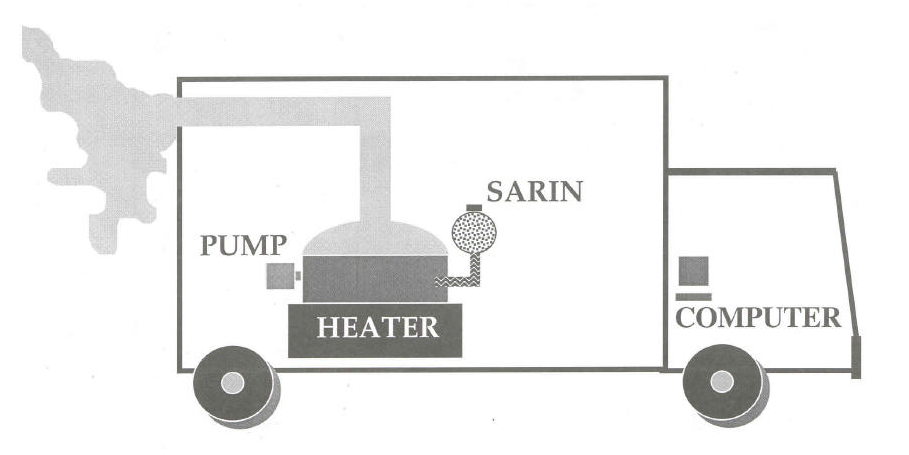
A depiction of the sarin truck

At 11:30 pm, Matsumoto police received an urgent report from paramedics that casualties were being transported to hospital. The patients were suffering from darkened vision, eye pain, headaches, nausea, diarrhea, miosis (constricted pupils), and numbness in their hands. Some victims described having seen a fog with a pungent and irritating smell floating by. 274 people were treated. Five dead residents were discovered in their apartments, and two died in hospital immediately after admission. An eighth victim, Sumiko Kono, remained in a coma for fourteen years and died in 2008. The fatalities included Yutaka Kobayashi, a 23-year-old salaryman, and Mii Yasumoto, a 29-year-old medical school student.

=== Additional incidents before 1995 ===
The cult is known to have considered assassinations of several individuals critical of the cult, such as the heads of Soka Gakkai and The Institute for Research in Human Happiness. After cartoonist Yoshinori Kobayashi began satirizing the cult, he was included on Aum's assassination list. An assassination attempt was made on Kobayashi in 1993. In 1991, Aum began to use wiretapping to get NTT uniforms/equipment, and created a manual for wiretapping.

In July 1993, cult members sprayed large amounts of liquid containing Bacillus anthracis spores from a cooling tower on the roof of Aum Shinrikyo's Tokyo headquarters. Their plan to cause an anthrax epidemic failed. The attack resulted in a large number of complaints about bad odors but no infections. At the end of 1993, the cult started secretly manufacturing the nerve agents sarin and later VX. Aum tested its sarin on sheep at Banjawarn Station, a remote pastoral property in Western Australia, killing 29 sheep. Both sarin and VX were then used in several assassinations between 1994 and 1995.

At the end of 1994, the cult broke into the Hiroshima factory of Mitsubishi Heavy Industries, in an attempt to steal technical documents on military weapons such as tanks and artillery. In December 1994 and January 1995, Masami Tsuchiya of Aum Shinrikyo synthesized 100 to 200 grams of VX, which was used to attack three people. On December 2, Noboru Mizuno was attacked with syringes containing VX nerve agent, leaving him in a serious condition. The VX victim, who Asahara had suspected was a spy, was attacked at 7:00 am on December 12, 1994, on a street in Osaka by Tomomitsu Niimi and another Aum member, who sprinkled the nerve agent on his neck. He chased them for about 100 yards (91 m) before collapsing, dying ten days later without coming out of a deep coma. Doctors in the hospital suspected at the time he had been poisoned with an organophosphate pesticide. The cause of death was pinned down only after cult members were arrested for the subway attack in Tokyo in March 1995 confessed to the killing.

On January 4, 1995, Hiroyuki Nagaoka, an important member of the Aum Victims' Society, a civil organization that protested against the sect's activities, was assassinated in the same way. In February 1995, several cult members kidnapped Kiyoshi Kariya, a 69-year-old brother of a member who had escaped, from a Tokyo street and took him to a compound in Kamikuishiki near Mount Fuji, where he was killed. His corpse was destroyed in a microwave-powered incinerator and the remnants disposed of in Lake Kawaguchi. Before Kariya was abducted, he had been receiving threatening phone calls demanding to know the whereabouts of his sister, and he left a note saying, "If I disappear, I was abducted by Aum Shinrikyo".

Police made plans to simultaneously raid cult facilities across Japan in March 1995. Prosecutors alleged Asahara was tipped off about this and that he ordered the Tokyo subway attack to divert police. Meanwhile, Aum had attempted to manufacture 1,000 assault rifles, but only completed one. According to the testimony of Kenichi Hirose at the Tokyo District Court in 2000, Asahara wanted the group to be self-sufficient in manufacturing copies of the Soviet Union's main infantry weapon, the AK-74. One rifle was smuggled into Japan to be studied so that Aum could reverse-engineer and mass-produce it. Police seized AK-74 components and blueprints from a vehicle used by an Aum member on April 6, 1995.

== Tokyo subway gas attack, arrests, and further incidents ==
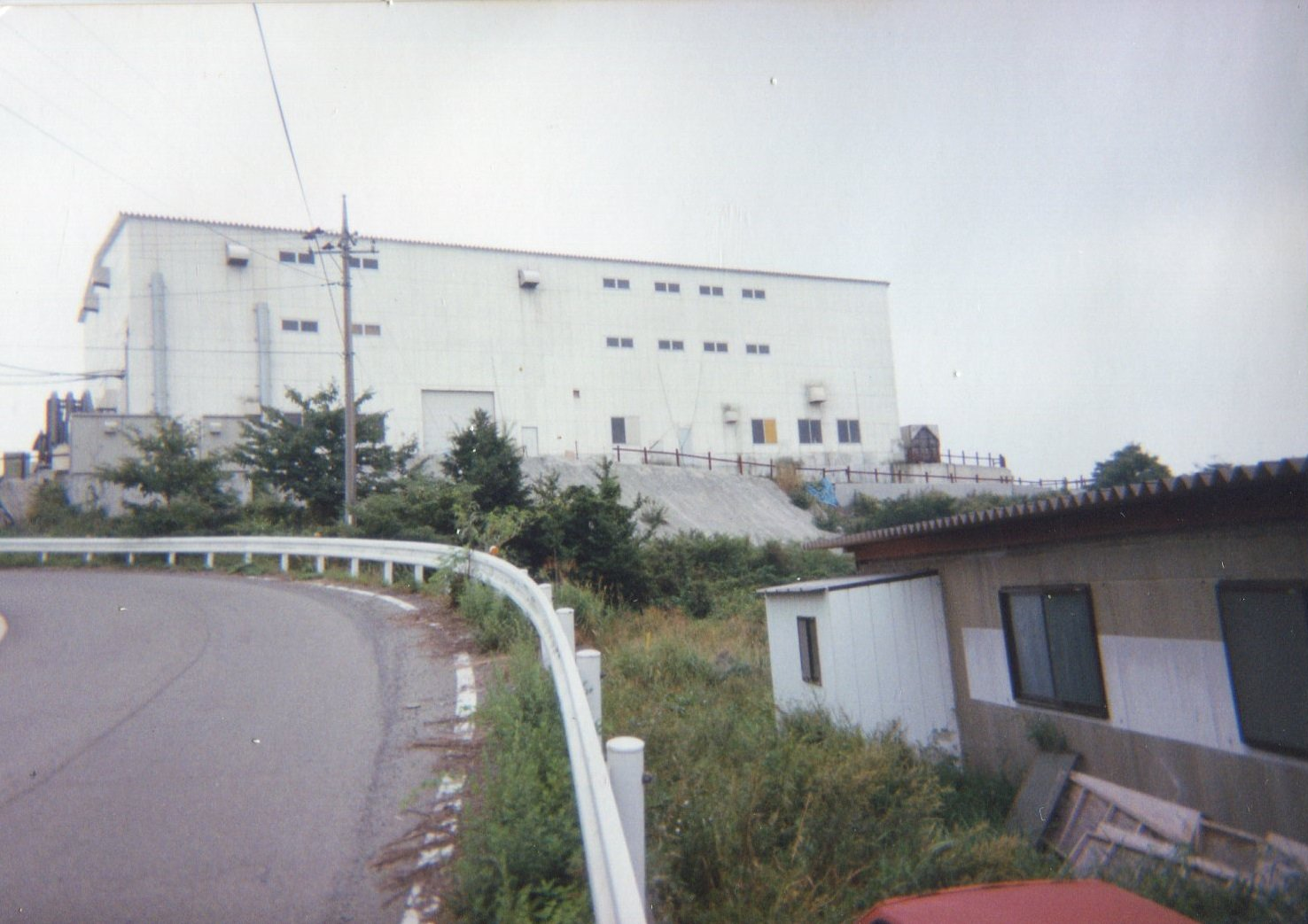
The Aum Shinrikyo facility in Kamikuisshiki

On the morning of March 20, 1995, Aum members released a binary chemical weapon, chemically most closely similar to sarin, in a coordinated attack on five trains in the Tokyo subway system, killing 13 commuters, seriously injuring 54 and affecting 980 more. Some estimates claim as many as 6,000 people were injured by the sarin. It is difficult to obtain exact numbers since many victims are reluctant to come forward. Prosecutors allege that Asahara was tipped off by an insider about planned police raids on cult facilities and ordered an attack in central Tokyo to divert police attention away from the group. The attack evidently backfired, and police conducted huge simultaneous raids on cult compounds across the country.

Over the next weeks, the full scale of Aum's activities was revealed for the first time. At the cult's headquarters in Kamikuishiki on the foot of Mount Fuji, police found explosives, chemical weapons, and a Russian Mil Mi-17 military helicopter. While the finding of biological warfare agents such as anthrax and Ebola cultures was reported, those claims now appear to have been widely exaggerated. There were stockpiles of chemicals that could be used for producing enough sarin to kill four million people.

On March 30, 1995, Takaji Kunimatsu, chief of the National Police Agency, was shot four times near his house in Tokyo and was seriously wounded. While many suspected Aum involvement in the shooting, the Sankei Shimbun reported that Hiroshi Nakamura is suspected of the crime, but nobody has been charged.

On April 23, 1995, Hideo Murai, the head of Aum's Ministry of Science, was stabbed to death outside the cult's Tokyo headquarters amidst a crowd of about 100 reporters, in front of cameras. The man responsible, a Korean member of Yamaguchi-gumi, was arrested and eventually convicted of the murder. His motive remains unknown. On the evening of May 5, a burning paper bag was discovered in a toilet in Tokyo's busy Shinjuku station. Upon examination it was revealed that it was a hydrogen cyanide device which, had it not been extinguished in time, would have released enough gas into the ventilation system to potentially kill 10,000 commuters. On July 4, several undetonated cyanide devices were found at other locations in the Tokyo subway.

During this time, numerous cult members were arrested for various offenses, but arrests of the most senior members on the charge of the subway gassing had not yet taken place. In June, an individual unrelated to Aum had launched a copycat attack by hijacking All Nippon Airways Flight 857, a Boeing 747 bound for Hakodate from Tokyo. The hijacker claimed to be an Aum member in possession of sarin and plastic explosives, but these claims were ultimately found to be false. Asahara was finally found hiding within a wall of a cult building known as "The 6th Satian" in the Kamikuishiki complex on May 16 and was arrested. On the same day, the cult mailed a parcel bomb to the office of Yukio Aoshima, the governor of Tokyo, blowing off the fingers of his secretary's hand.

=== After 1995 ===
On June 21, 1995, Asahara acknowledged that in January 1994 he had ordered the killing of a sect member, Kotaro Ochida, a pharmacist at an Aum hospital. Ochida, who tried to escape from a sect compound, was held down and strangled by another Aum member who was allegedly told that he too would be killed if he did not strangle Ochida. Fumihiro Joyu, one of the few senior leaders of the group under Asahara who did not face serious charges, became official head of the organization in 1999. Kōki Ishii, a legislator who formed an anti-Aum committee in the National Diet in 1999, was murdered in 2002. At 11:50 pm on December 31, 2011, Makoto Hirata surrendered himself to the police and was arrested on suspicion of being involved in the 1995 abduction of Kiyoshi Kariya, a non-member who had died during an Aum kidnapping and interrogation.

== Trial and execution ==
Asahara's death warrant

Asahara faced 27 counts of murder in 13 separate indictments. The prosecution argued that Asahara gave orders to attack the Tokyo Subway to "overthrow the government and install himself in the position of Emperor of Japan". Later, during the trial which took more than seven years to conclude, the prosecution forwarded an additional theory that the attacks were ordered to divert police attention away from Aum. The prosecution also accused Asahara of masterminding the Matsumoto incident and the Sakamoto family murder. During the trials, some of the disciples testified against Asahara, and he was found guilty on 13 of 17 charges, including the Sakamoto family murder; four charges were dropped. On February 27, 2004, he was sentenced to death. The trial was called the "trial of the century" by the Japanese media.

The defence appealed against Asahara's sentence on the grounds that he was mentally unfit and psychiatric examinations were undertaken. During much of the trials, Asahara remained silent or only muttered to himself. However, he communicated with the staff at his detention facility, which convinced the examiner that Asahara was maintaining his silence out of free will. Owing to his lawyers' failure to submit the statement of reason for appeal, the Tokyo High Court decided on March 27, 2006, not to grant them leave to appeal. This decision was upheld by the Supreme Court of Japan on September 15, 2006. Two re-trial appeals were declined by the appellate court. In June 2012, Asahara's execution was postponed due to arrests of several fugitive Aum Shinrikyo members.

Asahara was executed by hanging at the Tokyo Detention House on July 6, 2018, along with six other cult members. Relatives of victims said they approved of the execution. Asahara was asked shortly before his execution how his body should be handled. After saying "Wait a minute" and appearing to think, he answered "the fourth daughter," indicating that his remains should be given to her. His fourth daughter was unsympathetic to the cult and stated she planned to dispose of the ashes at sea; this was contested by Asahara's wife, third daughter, and other family members, who were suspected of wanting to enshrine the ashes where believers can honor them. Until 2024, the ashes remained at the Tokyo Detention House. In 2021, the Supreme Court of Japan ordered Asahara's remains to be released to his second daughter, which was affirmed by the Tokyo District Court in 2024.

== See also ==
- Capital punishment in Japan
- Doomsday cult
- List of executions in Japan
- List of people claimed to be Jesus
- Messiah complex
