= David E. Kaplan (journalist) =

American journalist

- Born: 1955 (age 70–71); U.S.
- Occupation: Investigative journalist

David E. Kaplan (born 1955) is an investigative reporter and former founding executive director of the Global Investigative Journalism Network (2012-2023) with 266 member groups in 95 countries. He is a former director of the Center for Public Integrity's International Consortium of Investigative Journalists. Before this post, he worked as chief investigative correspondent for the American newsweekly U.S. News & World Report. Previously he was a journalist and editor with the Center for Investigative Reporting in San Francisco during the 1980s and 1990s.

== Works ==
David E. Kaplan has written extensively about terrorism, organized crime and intelligence matters, including corruption and racketeering efforts in North Korea, Saudi Arabia and Russia. Kaplan is co-author of Yakuza (University of California Press, 2003), as well as co-author of The Cult at the End of the World, on the Aum doomsday sect behind the 1995 nerve gassing of Tokyo's subway (Crown, 1996). He is author of Fires of the Dragon, on the life and murder of Taiwanese-American journalist Henry Liu.

== Books ==
- Cult at the End of the World: The Terrifying Story of the Aum Doomsday Cult, from the Subways of Tokyo to the Nuclear Arsenals of Russia. New York: Crown Publishers (1996). ISBN 0517705435.
- Yakuza: Japan's Criminal Underworld, Expanded Edition, with Alec Debro. Berkeley: University of California Press (2003). ISBN 0520215621.
