= Hiroshi Nakamura (dissident) =

Japanese dissident (1930–2024)

Hiroshi Nakamura (中村 泰, Nakamura Hiroshi, 1930 – May 22, 2024) was a Japanese dissident. After the Korean War broke out, he dropped out of Tokyo University, and decided to fight against Japan. He was multilingual and became a good shot by training. On November 23, 1956, he shot a policeman to death and received a life sentence. He was paroled in 1976. Following his release, he attempted to found an armed organization and collected guns. After being arrested for an attempted robbery in 2002, he was sentenced to 15 years in prison for the crime and also received another life sentence for his previous 2001 injury case. He was also suspected of the 1995 shooting of Takaji Kunimatsu, who was a chief of the National Police Agency. Nakamura died on May 22, 2024.
