= C11H26NO2PS =

The molecular formula C_{11}H_{26}NO_{2}PS (molar mass: 267.37 g/mol, exact mass: 267.1422 u) may refer to:

- Chinese VX (CVX)
- QL sulfide
- VR (nerve agent)
- VT (nerve agent)
- VX (nerve agent)
