= VX =

VX or vx may refer to:

== Science and technology ==
- VX (nerve agent), a neurotoxic chemical warfare agent
  - Chinese VX, structural isomer of VX
  - V-sub x, another organophosphate nerve agent of the V-series
- VX Nano, a brand of optical mouse by Logitech
- VX Revolution, a brand of optical mouse by Logitech
- Yaesu VX series, compact amateur radio handheld transceivers
- VX (videocassette format), an early consumer videocassette format produced by Panasonic
- Vx Multiphase Metering Technology for measuring oil, gas and water flowrates without phase separation in oil and gas industry
- WeChat (Chinese: 微信; pinyin: Wēixìn) colloquially referred to as "VX", a Chinese multi-purpose messaging, social media, and mobile payment app developed by Tencent
- Apricot VX FT, line of PC-based servers released by Apricot Computers in 1989

== Transport ==
- ACES Colombia (IATA code VX, 1971-2003), a Colombian airline
- Codename of the 2013 to 2017 Dodge Viper
- Exeed VX, a Chinese mid-size SUV
- Holden Commodore (VX), model of GM Holden's Commodore car
- Para-Ski VX, a Canadian powered parachute design
- V_{X}, the speed that allows an aircraft the best angle of climb
- Virgin America (IATA code VX, 2004-2018), a U.S. airline

== Other uses ==
- VX (sport), a ball sport
- RPG Maker VX, an RPG Maker game
