= C9H22NO2PS =

The molecular formula C_{9}H_{22}NO_{2}PS (molar mass: 239.31 g/mol, exact mass: 239.1109 u) may refer to:

- EA-2192
- VM (nerve agent)
