= Secret Service (2008 video game) =

- Developer(s): Cauldron HQ
- Publisher(s): Activision
- Designer(s): Dan Arey
- Writer(s): Dan Arey; Michael G. Ryan
- Composer(s): Juraj Karkuš; Marek Lacena
- Engine: CloakNT
- Platform(s): Microsoft Windows, PlayStation 2, Xbox 360
- Release: X360/PS2: November 4, 2008; PC: November 11, 2008; EU: December 3, 2009
- Genre(s): First-person shooter
- Mode(s): Single-player

Secret Service is a first-person shooter video game developed by Cauldron HQ and published by Activision for Microsoft Windows, PlayStation 2 and Xbox 360. It is set in Washington, D.C., on Inauguration Day, where the player assumes the role of an elite agent named Pierce, whose task is to eliminate enemies to prevent them from attacking the Capitol. The game uses the CloakNT in-game engine. The game, announced in October 2008, was released for Xbox 360 and PlayStation 2 on November 4, 2008, and for PC on November 11, 2008. It was later released in Europe on March 12, 2009.

== Gameplay ==
The gameplay is similar to Die Hard: Vendetta, the James Bond games, and Soldier of Fortune: Payback. The game contains puzzle elements, where players must defuse bombs and unlock doors.

== Plot ==
On the day of the Presidential inauguration, Secret Service Agent Pierce (Nolan North), a member of the personal detail for the current president, Simon (David Kaye), receives a phone call from an unknown caller (Michael Gough), whom he names "Semper"; Latin for "always" or "ever". "Semper" warns that Simon is in danger and that someone at the top has compromised the Secret Service warning that "They are tyrants everywhere".

Shortly thereafter, dozens of armed Hispanic hostiles attack the Lincoln Memorial, where President Simon is shot. After Pierce takes down several RPGs, Simon is extracted to Walter Reed Medical Center.

Then, reports of bombs planted in the Capitol Building with over one hundred civilians trapped in the cross fire. Pierce enters to disarm the bombs, while another agent, Doyle (Fred Tatasciore), provides updates on situation. Although the bomb squad is killed when they enter the building, Pierce manages to disarm bombs. He then rescues a group of senators and questions the Speaker of the House, Senator Davies (Robert Clotworthy), about the Vice President-elect William H. Fritz (Jim Ward), and learns that the President-elect, Richards (Fred Tatasciore), and Vice President-elect were political enemies.

Doyle then updates that the bombs were a setup for CVX bombs that would decimate Washington DC, and they originated from the fictional island of Costa Sentava; a military dictatorship led by President Gerardo Vargas (Steve Blum), who had used CVX gas before on his people during a revolt and also announced it was no longer in production. Doyle tells Pierce that they had an inside man to not only get the gas in the country, but in the Capitol as well.

The soon-to-be US vice president is also leading the US delegation at the South American summit being held in DC. Doyle and Pierce discuss about how they need to get to the White House to expose what's happening, but Semper interjects implying that the top level people he's going to talk to could be the same top level people who could be behind the attacks.

Pierce enters a network of tunnels that lead to the White House fighting the terrorists and the tunnel's automated defences. En route to the White House, Pierce is told to stand down on orders of Special Agent Kauffman (David Kaye), the man in charge of the Secret Service Presidential Protection Division, but later on, while still in the tunnels, Pierce learns that President Simon died from his wounds, prompting Pierce to go rogue. Doyle tells him that the President-elect detail has gone quiet as well.

After preventing an explosion in the tunnels, Pierce enters Secret Service-held territory. Pierce must fight, non-lethally (per Doyle's command), through Secret Service agents ordered to stop him due to going rogue. After exiting the train depot chamber, Pierce eventually reaches the White House, though he has to fight his way through both Costa Sentavans and the agents respectively, the latter group of which, for unknown reasons, is with the former group, prompting Kauffman to order Pierce to take the rogue agents alive for interrogation. He also comes in radio contact with the honest agents holed up inside the Oval Office with both Richards, who had since been sworn in after Simon's death, and Fritz.

Pierce speaks to Richards and Fritz in the Oval Office, with Pierce suspecting that the latter is involved with Costa Sentava's invasion due to butting heads with Richards in the past, but they both confirm that they are on the same side despite their differences and are negotiating with the Costa Sentavan Government about their arms exports business. Suddenly, the Costa Sentavans attack the White House at night, and Pierce must work with the remaining honest agents to defend the complex before leaving for Andrews Air Force Base with Richards on board Marine One, with the exception of Fritz, who has left behind to draw off enemy fire to allow Richards to get away.

While on board Air Force One, Pierce is on the phone call with Semper that Davies is their main suspect as he was the ambassador to Costa Sentava for eight years around the same time as Fritz's time in the nation before transitioning as a Senator; Semper also confirms that Air Force One has a bio grenade containing the remaining CVX, which is going to be used to kill the President and the South American delegation. This proves true as Davies takes Richards hostage with some rogue agents backing the corrupt Senator. Pierce tries to negotiate Davies, but Davies claims that the US has grown weak due to diplomacy. Kauffman rescinds his earlier order and authorizes Pierce to use lethal force against the rogue agents in order to rescue the President and even remotely turning back Air Force One before terminating Davies for good.

Pierce and Doyle are both congratulated by Richards for all of their hard work and courage and are hailed as heroes in their lives. Sometime later, Vargas denounced the assassins, denying any involvement, and the safety of US investigators in Costa Sentava would be jeopardized. In the epilogue, Pierce and Semper contact once more, and though Semper decides not to reveal his own identity, he tells Pierce that he will be in touch soon, repeating his earlier statement of tyrants.

== Reception ==
Reception

Review scores
Publication	Score		
Publication	PC	PS2	Xbox 360
IGN	4.5/10	2.5/10	4.5/10
Official Xbox Magazine (US)			5.0/10

Secret Service has received generally negative reviews. It has an aggregate score of 49.50% on GameRankings for the Xbox 360 version based on 4 reviews. IGN reviewer Charles Onyett awarded the Microsoft Windows and Xbox 360 version a 4.5 rating, praising some of the game's artificial intelligence for having a bit of challenge. However, Oynett pointed out the game's single-player campaign for being too short and not featuring a multiplayer mode.

Writing for Official Xbox Magazine, reviewer Cameron Lewis called it a "decent low-rent shooter" with "uninspired level designs" and "dim enemies", giving it a 5.0/10. Paul Kautz of online magazine 4Players remarked on the game's short runtime of "[no] more than six hours" and lackluster level design. They called the puzzle segments "super fun" but only made challenging by "the harsh time limit".

== See also ==
- United States Secret Service
