= Methyldichlorophosphine =

Names
- Preferred IUPAC name Methylphosphonous dichloride
- Other names Methyl phosphonous dichloride, Dichloromethylphosphine, SW

Identifiers
| CAS Number | 676-83-5 |
| 3D model (JSmol) | Interactive image |
| ChemSpider | 55138 |
| ECHA InfoCard | 100.010.575 |
| EC Number | 211-631-8 |
| PubChem CID | 61194 |
| UN number | 2845 |
| CompTox Dashboard (EPA) | DTXSID1060978 |
- InChI: InChI=1S/CH3Cl2P/c1-4(2)3/h1H3 Key: CDPKWOKGVUHZFR-UHFFFAOYSA-N
- SMILES: CP(Cl)Cl

Properties
| Chemical formula | CH_{3}Cl_{2}P |
| Molar mass | 116.91 g·mol^{−1} |
| Appearance | Colorless liquid |
- Except where otherwise noted, data are given for materials in their standard state (at 25 °C [77 °F], 100 kPa). Infobox references

Methyldichlorophosphine (alternatively known as dichloro(methyl)phosphane, SW and methylphosphonous dichloride) is an organophosphorus compound with the chemical formula CH_{3}PCl_{2}. It is a colorless, corrosive, flammable, and highly reactive liquid with a pungent odor.

== Preparation ==
Methyldichlorophosphine is produced by alkylation of phosphorus trichloride with methyl iodide followed by reduction of the resulting phosphonium salt with iron powder:

CH_{3}I + PCl_{3} + AlCl_{3} → [CH_{3}PCl_{3}]^{+}AlCl_{3}I^{−}
[CH_{3}PCl_{3}]^{+}AlCl_{3}I^{−} + Fe → CH_{3}PCl_{2} + FeICl + AlCl_{3}

The compound is an intermediate for the synthesis of other chemicals for instance dimethylphenylphosphine.

== Uses ==
Methyldichlorophosphine belongs to the group of halophosphines, some of which are used as intermediates in the production of plant protection agents, stabilizers for plastics, and catalysts. It is a precursor of the herbicide Glufosinate. It is also used in the production of flameproofing compounds.

Due to the recycling problem of phosphoryl chloride, SW was adopted in step three of the DMHP process in the preparation of Sarin. SW was also adopted as a standard precursor to V agents, having been used to prepare QL for unitary and binary VX. SW was the first agent adopted to prepare VX in one pot reaction by aqueous medium.

== Safety ==
It is also toxic if inhaled, can cause burns upon contact with the skin and eyes, and releases fumes of hydrochloric acid in moist environments.
