= M426 =

M426 may refer to:

- M425 and 426 tractor truck
- M426 8-inch shell
