= M578 light recovery vehicle =

M578 LRV
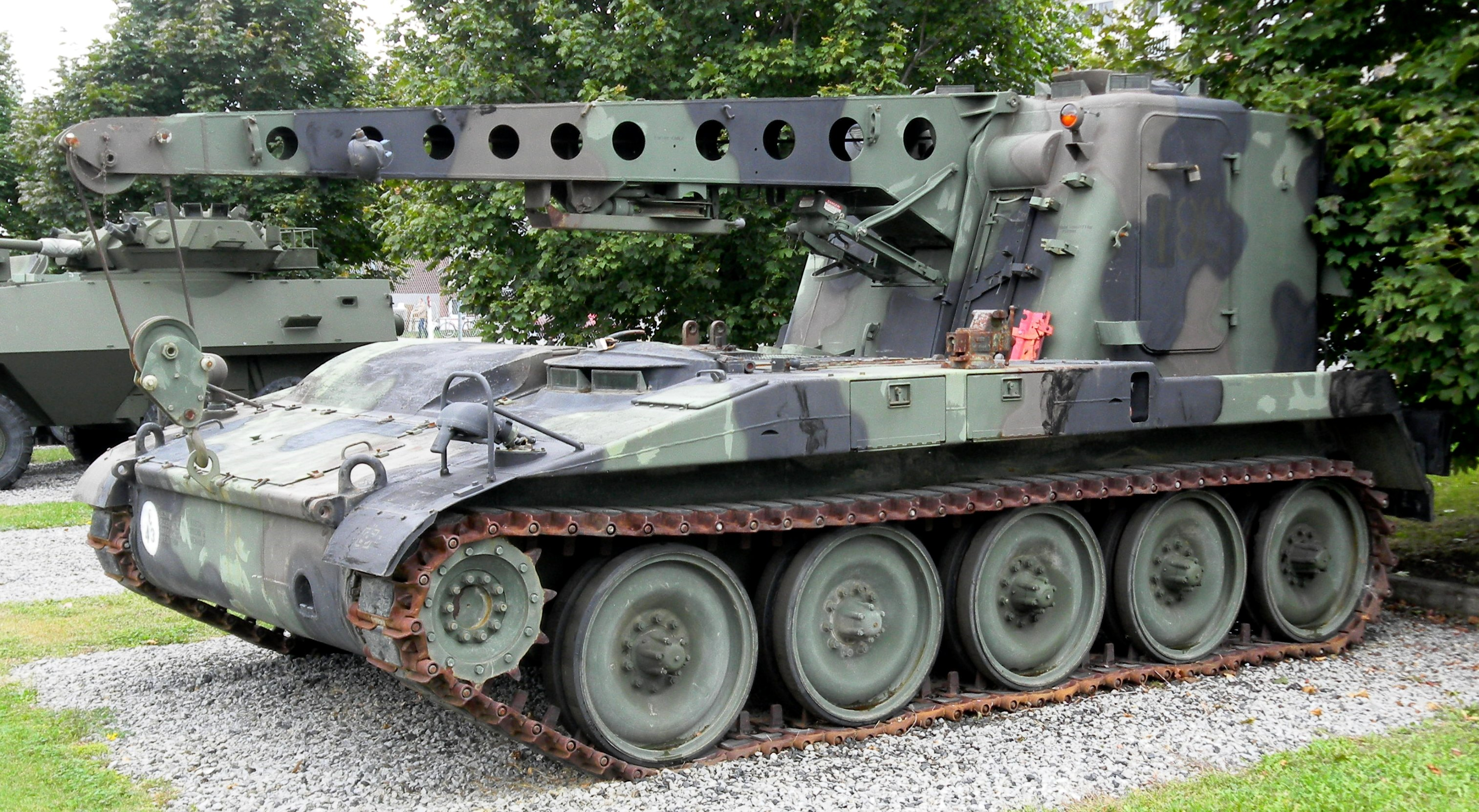
- M578 Light Recovery Vehicle in RCOC Museum at Montreal
- Type: Armored recovery vehicle
- Place of origin: United States

Service history
- Used by: See Operators
- Wars: Vietnam War; Lebanese Civil War; Gulf War

Production history
- Designer: Pacific Car & Foundry Company
- Manufacturer: FMC Corp. (vehicle body), General Motors (engine), Allison Transmission(transmission) Bowen-McLaughlin-York
- Produced: 1962

Specifications
- Mass: 27.0 short tons (24.5 t; 24.1 long tons)
- Length: 18 ft 3.8 in (5.583 m)
- Width: 10 ft 4 in (3.15 m)
- Height: 8 ft 7.5 in (2.629 m)
- Crew: 3 men: Crane operator in cab right front Rigger in cab left front Driver in hull left front
- Armor: 13 mm (0.5 inches) Steel
- Main armament: .50-caliber M2HB machine gun (500 rounds)
- Engine: General Motors 8V71T; 8 cylinder, 2 cycle, vee, supercharged diesel 345 hp @ 2,300 rpm
- Suspension: Torsion bar suspension
- Fuel capacity: 1,137 litres (250 imperial gallons; 300 US gallons)
- Operational range: 450 miles (724 km)
- Maximum speed: 37 mph (60 km/h)

The M578 light recovery vehicle (G309) was an American Cold War-era armored recovery vehicle. The M578 utilized the same chassis as the M107 self-propelled gun and M110 self-propelled howitzer. The M578 provided maintenance support to mechanized infantry and artillery units. Its primary mission was to recover damaged light armored vehicles from the battlefield using its crane boom.

== History ==
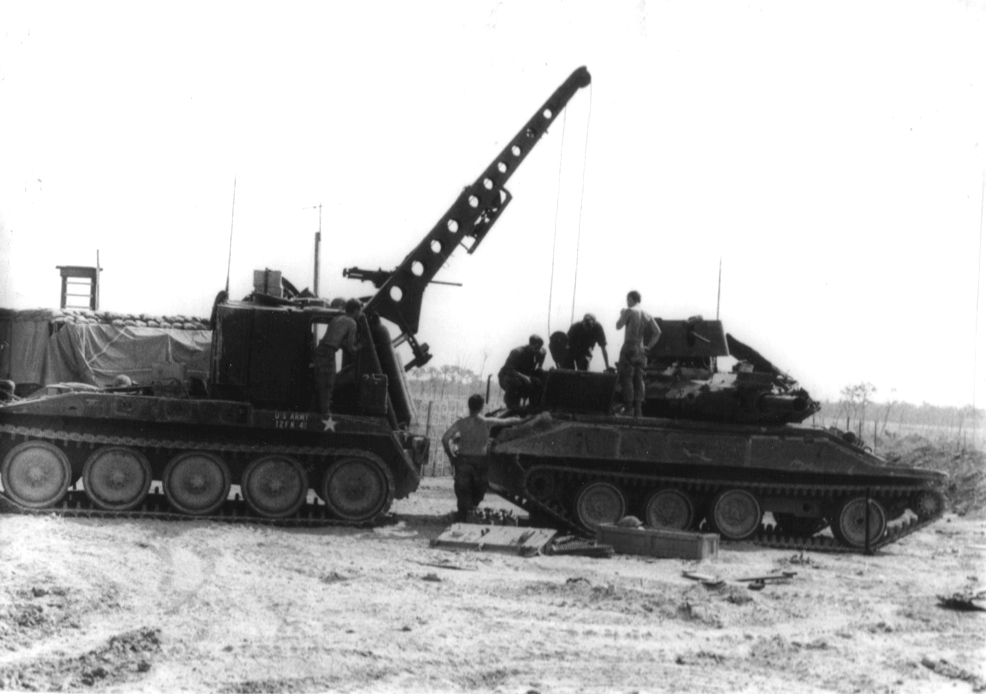
The M578 recovery vehicle is seen here assisting the crew of an M551 Sheridan light tank in Vietnam.

In 1956 the US Army commissioned the Pacific Car & Foundry Company to design an undercarriage for a new series of self-propelled artillery systems that would be lighter, air transportable, and provide a common chassis for multiple vehicles. This would then become the M107 self-propelled gun and M110 self-propelled gun with the Army expanding the program in 1957 to include a field ambulance (T119) and an armored light recovery vehicle (T120) with the T119 being dropped from the program during the prototype phase. The T120 went through testing starting in 1959, now being designated the T120E1 and was accepted for service after completing testing with production of the vehicle starting in late 1962 by FMC Corp. and would continue in production till the end of the 1960s. In 1975 production resumed under Bowen-McLaughlin-York (later United Defense Industries) with an additional 448 vehicles for the US Army between 1975 and 1977 at a cost of US$189,000 per vehicle, followed by export orders to other countries. In 1981 production would be discontinued permanently.

== Vehicle Operation ==
The cab could rotate 360°, and had a 30,000 lb (13,600 kg) capacity winch which ran through a crane on the cab. Another winch, 60,000 lb (27,000 kg) capacity, was mounted on the front of the cab. Access to the cab was through a door on each side and by double doors in the rear, while the crane operator and rigger both had vision cupolas in the cab roof.

== Operators ==
- Argentina: Argentine Army At least 1 test vehicle
- Austria: Austrian Army - 22 vehicles sold from Netherlands to Austria in 1996, now out of service.
- Bahrain: Royal Bahraini Army - 2 vehicles sold from Netherlands to Bahrain in 1996.
- Bolivia: Bolivian Army
- Botswana: Botswana Ground Force
- Brazil: Brazilian Army - At least 17 vehicles in inventory, unclear if all the vehicles are still in service as of June 2022.
- Canada: Canadian Army - At least 50 vehicles had been in service and remained in inventory as of early 2008, which have since been retired from service.
- Chile: Chilean Army - 3 vehicles purchased in 1970, the vehicles have since been retired from service.
- Denmark: Royal Danish Army - 24 vehicles purchased during 1966–1970, no longer in service.
- Egypt: Egyptian Army - At least 45 vehicles in inventory, unclear if all the vehicles are still in service as of June 2022.
- Greece: Hellenic Army - At least 113 vehicles in inventory, unclear if all the vehicles are still in service as of June 2022.
- Iran: Iranian army
- Israel: Israel Defense Forces
- Jordan: Royal Jordanian Land Force
- Lebanon: Lebanese Armed Forces - At least 4 vehicles were provided as US aid during the early 1980s.
- Morocco: Royal Moroccan Army - At least 86 vehicles in inventory, unclear if all the vehicles are still in service as of June 2022.
- Peru: Army of Peru
- Netherlands: Royal Netherlands Army - A total of 25 vehicles were purchased during three orders of 8 vehicles (1965), 12 vehicles (1966) and 5 vehicles (unknown), with all vehicles leaving service and being sold by the end of 1996.
- Norway: Norwegian Army
- Philippines: Philippine Army
- Portugal: Portuguese Army - 29 vehicles in service (21 vehicles in service since 1995, 8 vehicles since 1997).
- Saudi Arabia: Saudi Arabian Army - At least 90 vehicles in inventory, unclear if all the vehicles are still in service as of June 2022.
- Spain: Spanish Army
- Turkey: Turkish Army
- Thailand: Royal Thai Army
- United Kingdom: British Army
- United States: United States Army - At least 448 vehicles were in service with the Army but the exact amount from the first production series is unclear as the information is still currently redacted as of June 2022.
- South Vietnam: Army of the Republic of Vietnam
- Vietnam: People's Army of Vietnam
- Yemen: Yemen Army

== See also ==
- List of U.S. military vehicles by model number
