= XM736 8-inch projectile =

The XM-736 8-inch projectile was a binary howitzer round that was designed to carry the nerve agent VX. After the suspension of the testing in 1982, models indicated the shell could be unstable in flight due to the liquid properties of VX. However, instabilities were not observed during earlier testing, and it is unknown if instabilities in the shell were ever found.
