= M107 self-propelled gun =

Cold War-era American heavy artillery

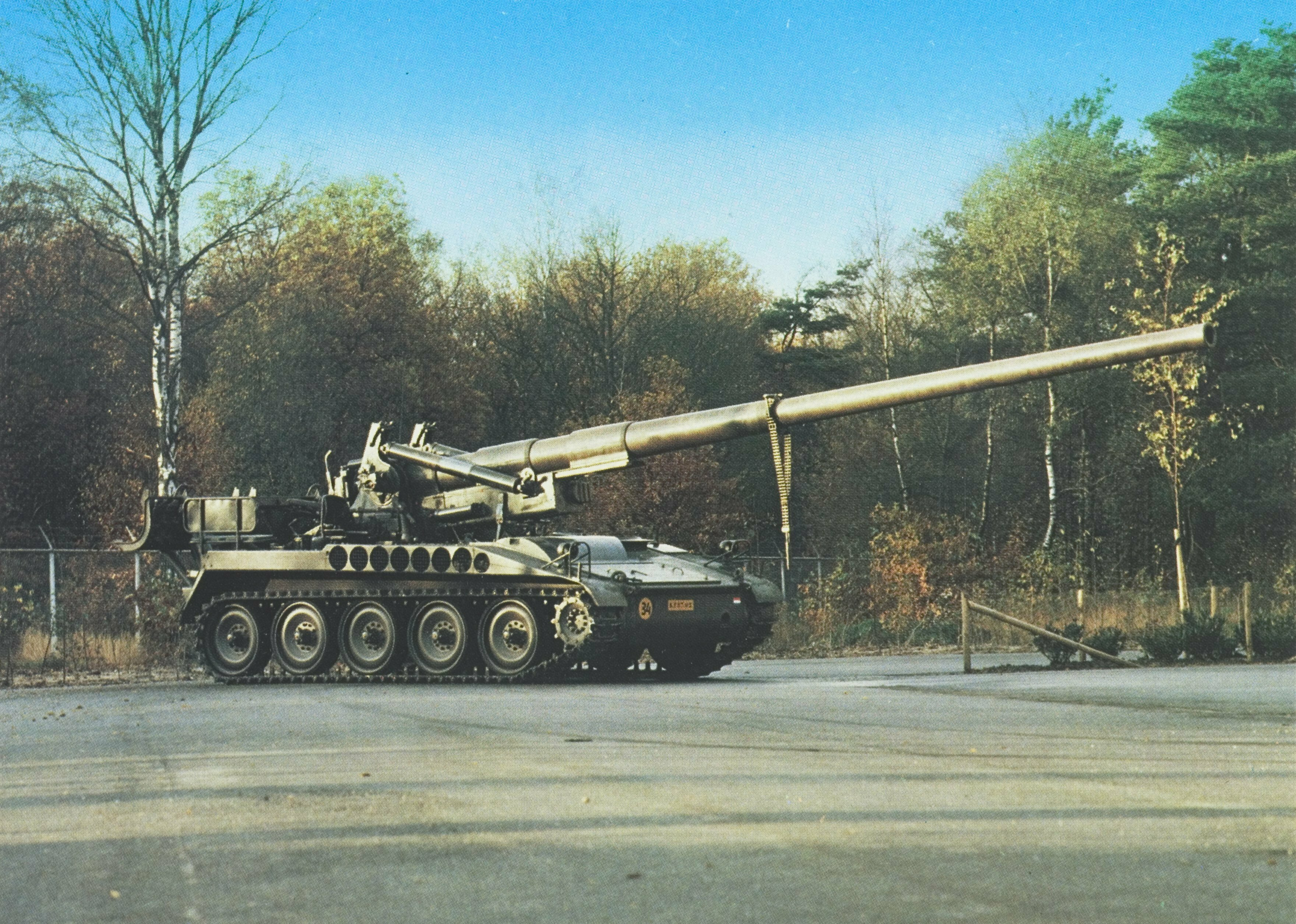
- M107 self-propelled gun in Dutch service.
- Type: Self-propelled artillery
- Place of origin: United States

Service history
- In service: United States (1962–1978)
- Used by: See Users
- Wars: Vietnam War; Yom Kippur War; Cambodian–Vietnamese War; Iran–Iraq War; 1982 Lebanon War; South Lebanon conflict (1985–2000)

Production history
- Manufacturer: FMC Corp., Bowen-McLaughlin-York, General Motors (transmission)

Specifications
- Mass: Combat: 28.3 t (27.9 long tons; 31.2 short tons)
- Length: Hull: 6.46 m (21 ft 2 in); Overall: 11.30 m (37 ft 1 in)
- Barrel length: L/60
- Width: 3.15 m (10 ft 4 in)
- Height: 3.47 m (11 ft 5 in)
- Crew: 13 (vehicle capacity 5)
- Caliber: 175 mm (6.9 in)
- Elevation: −5° to +65° deg.
- Traverse: 60°
- Rate of fire: Rapid: 1 rpm Regular: 1 round every two minutes
- Maximum firing range: 40 km (25 mi)
- Main armament: 1 × 175 mm M113 or M113A1 Gun
- Engine: General Motors 8V71T; 8 cylinder, 2 cycle, vee, supercharged diesel 405 hp
- Suspension: torsion bar
- Ground clearance: 44 cm (1 ft 5 in)
- Operational range: 720 km (450 mi)
- Maximum speed: 80 km/h (50 mph)

The M107 175 mm (6.9 in) self-propelled gun was used by the U.S. Army and U.S. Marine Corps from the early 1960s to the late 1970s. It was part of a family of self-propelled artillery that included the M110. It was intended to provide long-range fire support in an air-transportable system. It was exported to several other countries including Germany, South Korea, Spain, Greece, Iran, Israel, Italy, the Netherlands, the United Kingdom, and Turkey. The M107's combat history in U.S. service was limited to the Vietnam War; it also saw extensive combat use in Israeli service. The M107 shared many components with, and in many cases was replaced by, later versions of the M110 203 mm (8.0 in) howitzer. Although withdrawn from U.S. service in the late 1970s, it continues to see military service as of 2024.

== Design and production history ==
During the 1950s, the standard U.S. Army motorized 203 mm (8.0 in) artillery piece was the M55, based on the chassis and the turret of the M53 155 mm self-propelled gun, which used some components from the M48 tank. The weight of the M55, at 44 t (43 long tons; 49 short tons), prohibited air transportation and its gasoline engines limited its range to approximately 260 km (160 mi), and presented a severe fire hazard in combat.

This led the U.S. Army to issue a requirement for a new series of self-propelled artillery systems: the new weapons were to be lighter, to be transportable by air, and would continue the practice of deriving several vehicles from the same chassis, to simplify maintenance and training. The Pacific Car and Foundry (Paccar) company developed several prototypes. The 175 mm (6.9 in) diesel engine driven T235 self-propelled gun and 203 mm (8.0 in) T236 self-propelled howitzer, aside from the different armament, were essentially the same vehicle. They were introduced into U.S. Army service as the M107 and M110 in 1962 and 1963, respectively.

Paccar received the M107 and M110 design contracts and initial manufacturing bids from Detroit Arsenal. This was based on patented key features of the M55: the pneumatic equilibrator, which improved barrel balance, enabling the gun to be elevated more easily (this was linked to a hydraulically controlled pendulum); an improved ratchet mechanism to improve aiming; a new design of hydraulic recoil mechanism; and hydraulically controlled chassis suspension bracing when the gun was firing. Two other firms also produced the M107: FMC, between 1965 and 1980, and Bowen-McLaughlin-York.

The M107 and M110 use the same drive train components as the M578 light recovery vehicle. In addition to its use in performing maintenance on the M107 and M110, and for recovery of damaged or inoperable vehicles, this vehicle has seen wide employment in various engineering roles.

Later on many of the 175 mm (6.9 in) M107s were rebuilt into the 203 mm (8.0 in) M110A2 configuration.

== Chassis ==
Both the M107 and M110 are based on a common chassis, which features five road wheels on either side of the chassis, idler arms attached to torsion bars, tracks driven from the front by a 450 hp (340 kW) General Motors turbo supercharged diesel with the turbocharger connected to the supercharger by a steel pencil sized "quill" shaft. The engine and transmission are mounted in the front right, with the driver to its left. The engine had an attached hydraulic pump used to traverse the turret with a manual backup hand crank.

The hydraulic pump was sometimes improperly used to dig in the rear spade, resulting in damage to the hydraulic spade cylinders after the first round was fired. The manual backup was used to lay the gun, since the hydraulic control was too coarse. The primary purpose of the hydraulic pump was putting the barrel into battery, ramming ammunition and charges, raising or lowering the rear spade, rapid coarse deflection adjustment by the gunner and rapid coarse elevation adjustments by the assistant gunner.

=== Defensive capabilities ===
The M107/M110 chassis only provides protection to the driver, with 13 mm (0.51 in) of aluminum armor sufficient to block only small arms fire and shell splinters. Later on, Kevlar shields were often provided to M107 units for additional protection, but due to the unwieldiness of their use, these were often kept stowed on the sides of the vehicle or even left behind before deployment in the field.

== Key recognition features ==
- Long thin barrel without a fume extractor or muzzle brake.
- Gun is in an unprotected mount towards the rear of the hull with a large spade at the rear that is raised for traveling.
- Chassis is same as M110 203 mm (8.0 in) self-propelled howitzer with five large road wheels on each side, a drive sprocket front wheel and has no track-return rollers.

== Operations and maintenance ==
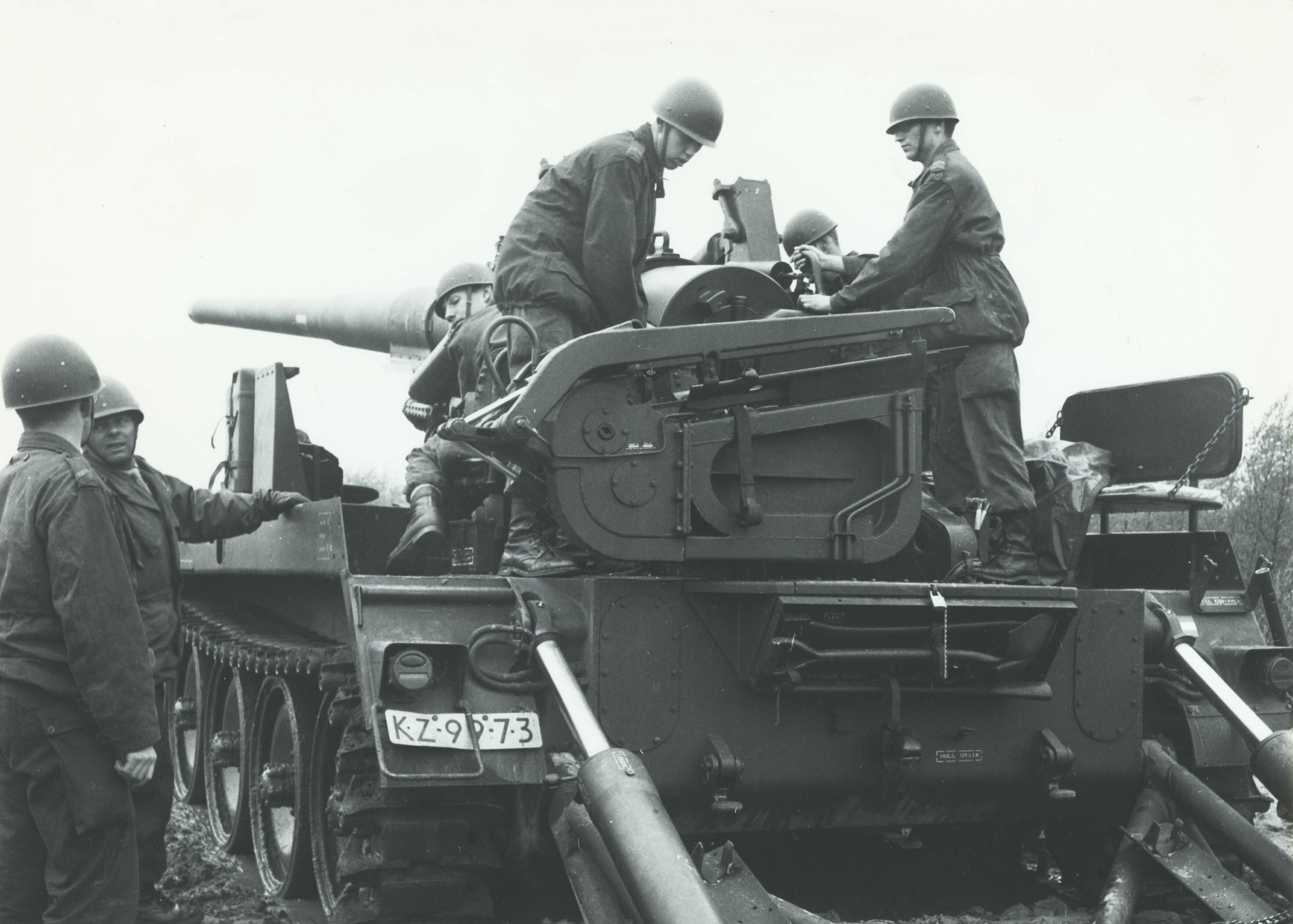
Dutch artillerymen prepare to fire the M107 howitzer.

The M107 has a larger open working space than the closed space of tank-like self-propelled artillery such as the M109 howitzer. This allows for faster reload times and its high maneuvering speed and fast reload time allows the M107 to practice shoot-and-scoot, redeploying before the firing position can be zeroed in on.

One drawback of the M107 in combat was that laying the gun involves skilled minute movements of the entire vehicle. The gunner uses hand signals to the driver, who views them in the left rear view mirror and moves the vehicle left or right by tapping on the steering bar. The other cannoneers (aka "Gun Bunnies") set the collimator and aiming stakes under the direction of the gunner.

Only two rounds are carried with its gun tractor on "loading trays". These rounds can be fired by the onboard crew of five (Section chief, driver, gunner, assistant gunner, Number one cannoneer) out of a total crew of thirteen. The rest of the ammunition and crew follow in the M548 Ammunition Carrier. If the gun was facing hostile artillery, the gun would fire and relocate where these crewmen would reload the M107 at the new location to avoid enemy counter-battery fire.

Each member of the M107 crew has specific duties when the vehicle is firing.

The Section chief operates the hydraulic load and ram, verification with "Gunner's Quadrant", as well as operating the rear spade and left spade unlock. The driver operates the positions spade and the barrel travel lock. The gunner controls deflection (the horizontal direction in which the gun is pointing). The Assistant gunner controls elevation. The Number one cannoneer opens and closes the breech, verifies ramming of the round with ram rod and powder load red on the rag (which means he can see the red igniter patch to verify that the powder is not put in backwards), loads the primer, hooks up the lanyard (pig tail), pulls lanyard on command, and unlocks the right spade lock. Cannoneers two through nine set up the collimator (US Army Tm 9-2300-216-10), aiming stakes, bore sight (For Direct Fire missions only), communications, prepare additional ammunition (including fuzing) and powder zones, provide security, drive the M548, operate the ring-mounted M2 .50 caliber machine gun, set up camouflage nets, dig a burn pit, and conduct the resupply of ammunition.

Early barrels were limited to 300 firings with the maximum zone 3 propellant, but later examples extended this to between 700 and 1,200 firings with extensive bore scoping by the supporting U.S. Army Ordnance Company.

"Weapons of the Field Artillery" (1966).

Retubing the barrel was necessary when the barrel had exhausted its service life, fractures were detected, or when converting the M107 to an M110. In U.S. Army Service, the lowest level of retube was done at the Artillery Battalion's maintenance shop. Retubing could also be done by Ordnance Depot Support Units or at fixed depots such as Anniston Army Depot, Picatinny Arsenal, or the Miesau Army Depot in Germany. When retubing was done at the battalion level, the M578 Light Recovery Vehicle was used. The barrels could not be replaced using a single M578 due to weight and the need for precise placement of the barrel into the cradle to prevent damaging the barrel brass runners. Two cranes were used, one on either end of the barrel. Retubing could also be used to convert the 175 mm (6.9 in) M107 to 203 mm (8.0 in) M110. This retubing was usually accomplished by the supporting U.S. Army Ordnance Company or a fixed depot as it requires an overhead electric rail winch and chassis modifications for the E2 barrel.

A single M578 was used to lift the engine or transmission from the hull once a month to clean the engine and transmission compartment, which was covered by two aluminum deck plates.

== Combat history ==
=== Vietnam War ===
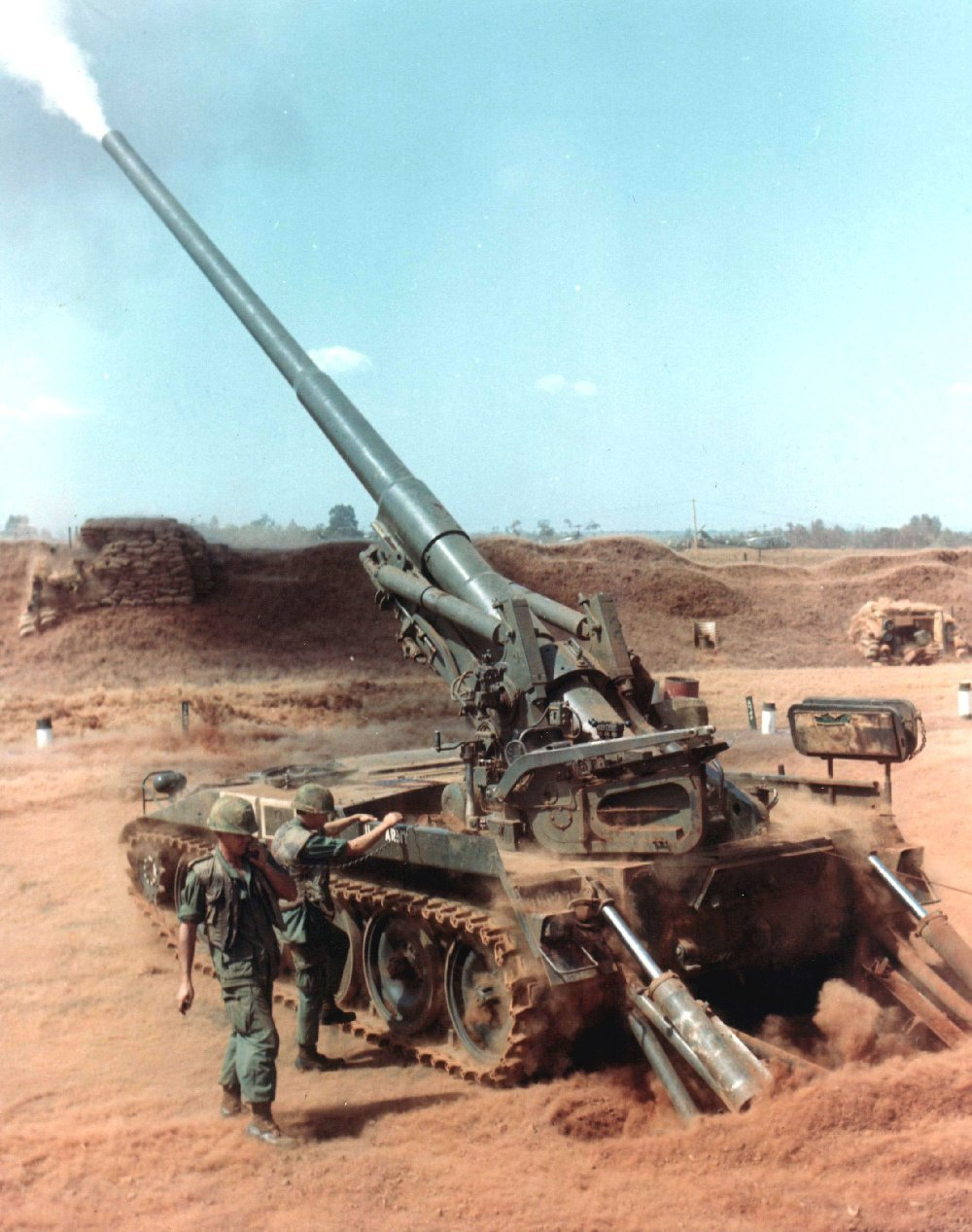
An M107 fires in support of US troops near the Cambodian border as part of Operation San Angelo in 1968.

The M107's combat experience with the US military was almost entirely limited to the Vietnam War. The Vietnamese words Sấm Sét ("Lightning") and Vua Chiến Trường ("King of the Battlefield") were often painted on the guns to commemorate its sheer firepower. There, it proved its effectiveness by having one of the longest ranges of any mobile artillery-piece operated during that theater of combat in the Cold War, outranging the Soviet 130 mm M46 heavy field guns employed by the People's Army of Vietnam (PAVN). Maximum range with M437A2 or M437A1 projectile is approximately 32.8 km (20.4 mi). This long-range advantage, along with its ability to rapidly move from its previous position, made it an effective weapon for destroying PAVN and Viet Cong command-and-control sites, communications facilities and supply-columns, while evading counter-battery fire from its Soviet counterparts in service with North Vietnam. This was proven in 1968 at the Battle of Khe Sanh, where American forces came under a long and intense siege by PAVN troops and were constantly bombarded by accompanying artillery fire.

The M107 also had its disadvantages. It was noted for its relative inaccuracy at longer ranges. The gun was assigned to corps-level artillery units and a number of M107/M110 composite-formed units were created, allowing the option of responding with the longer-ranged M107 or the more-accurate M110. In addition, as noted above, the gun barrel on the M107 required frequent changing on early versions of the weapon. Individual batteries did not have the necessary equipment and parts for changing the barrel, so higher-level maintenance support was required, taking two hours in addition to the transportation time. The M107 had an extremely low rate of fire of two rounds per minute. Due to the enormous size of the shells, the ammunition storage inside the vehicle only contained two rounds. Additional ammunition was supplied by the M548 ammunition transporter vehicles.

The M107 suffered losses during the Vietnam War, with a considerable number of them destroyed by PAVN troops. The PAVN also captured several M107s, mainly from ARVN forces. Four M107s were captured during the First Battle of Quảng Trị in April 1972 and another 12 were taken during the Central Highlands offensive in 1975 towards the end of the Vietnam War. These captured M107s were used by the PAVN during their last offensives against South Vietnam between March and April 1975. With these M107s, the PAVN established a strategic-artillery battalion after the war.

During the Vietnamese invasion of Cambodia against Pol Pot's Khmer Rouge government in neighbouring Cambodia, Vietnamese M107s participated in the many battles along the border of the two countries. Today, Vietnam's M107s are operated as second-line artillery pieces in times of war and are currently in reserve storage of the PAVN's Artillery Corps, together with other American artillery pieces captured from American or South Vietnamese forces during the Vietnam War, such as M101 howitzers 105 mm (4.1 in) and M114 howitzers 155 mm (6.1 in).

=== Israel ===
The M107 was also used by the Israel Defense Forces in the various Arab–Israeli conflicts from the Yom Kippur War on. During the Yom Kippur War it was one of the few weapons able to destroy Egyptian and Syrian anti-aircraft missile positions. Of the 15 SA-2 batteries lost by Egypt on the east bank of the Suez Canal, 13 were destroyed by M107s. When the IDF crossed the Suez Canal in Operation Gazelle, M107 SP guns were among the first to cross together with tanks and APCs. M107s also had sufficient range to hit the Syrian capital of Damascus. 108 more were received between 1973 and 1982 and they were also fielded during the Operation Peace for Galilee.

When these guns were outranged by rocket fire from Tyre, they were upgraded with the addition of extended range, full-bore ammunition and new powder supplied by Gerald Bull's Space Research Corporation. This allowed operations over 50 km (31 mi) with increased accuracy. The IDF acquired over 200 vehicles. In IDF service, the M107 is known as the Romach (spear or lance).

=== Other ===
M107s were extensively used by the Iranian Army during the Iran–Iraq War.

The M107 was retired from the U.S. Army in the late 1970s when the 175 mm (6.9 in) gun was changed to the extended length 203 mm (8.0 in) tube making the new unit an M110A2.

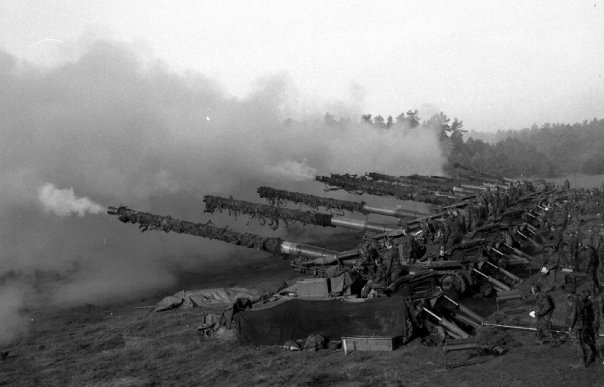
British M107

== Users ==
- Cyprus: Cypriot National Guard 12 M107
- Greece: Hellenic Army 36, 24 converted to M-110A2
- Iran: Imperial and Islamic Republic of Iran Army.
- Vietnam: PAVN captured several M107s during the Vietnam War. Currently are in reserve storage of PAVN Artillery Corps.

=== Former users ===
- Israel: Israel Defense Forces. 210 in service and in store.
- Italy
- Netherlands
- Spain: Spanish Army. 12, converted to M110A2 in the early 1990s.
- South Korea: Republic of Korea Army. 24, out of service since 2008.
- Turkey: Turkish Army.
- West Germany
- United Kingdom: Royal Artillery.
- United States: United States Army and United States Marine Corps.

== See also ==
- G-numbers (SNL G295)
- List of U.S. military vehicles by model number
