= EA-1763 =

Names
- Other names N-[2-[methyl(propoxy)phosphoryl]sulfanylethyl]-N-propan-2-ylpropan-2-amine

Identifiers
CAS Number	52364-45-1
3D model (JSmol)	Interactive image
PubChem CID	89671424
- InChI: InChI=1S/C12H28NO2PS/c1-7-9-15-16(6,14)17-10-8-13(11(2)3)12(4)5/h11-12H,7-10H2,1-6H3 Key: WPCWBOZLTXVEHU-UHFFFAOYSA-N
- SMILES: CCCOP(=O)(C)SCCN(C(C)C)C(C)C

Properties
Chemical formula	C_{12}H_{28}NO_{2}PS
Molar mass	281.39 g·mol^{−1}
Boiling point	316.5 °C (601.7 °F; 589.6 K)
- Except where otherwise noted, data are given for materials in their standard state (at 25 °C [77 °F], 100 kPa). Infobox references

EA-1763, O-PPVX, V1 or propyl S-2-diisopropylaminoethylmethylphosphonothiolate is a military-grade neurotoxic organophosphonate nerve agent related to VX as it is the propyl analogue of VX. It is part of the V-series.

== Chemical characteristics ==
Little information about EA-1763's physicochemical properties has been reported. V1 is a more viscous and less dense liquid than VX. It is colorless, odorless and tasteless in its pure form. When impure or in the crude form, it has a characteristic viscous amber color, giving it an appearance similar to motor oil. The appearance of the impure form varies between several shades of amber, from a viscous liquid of a transparent pale yellow color to a pasty liquid of a semi-transparent and cloudy dirty amber color. The smell varies from engine oil to an offensive brew of organosulfur compounds and organoamines.

Its larger alkane chain pushes its melting point above that of VX. The estimated solubility of V1 in water is 4 times lower compared to VX (6.8 g/L of water at 25 °C). V1 has high solubility in organic solvents and other non-polar compounds. The stability of V1 is roughly the same as that of VX in either environment. Higher insolubility and lower volatility can slow down the process. A vapor pressure at least 3 times lower than VX is speculated.

The longer alkane chain tends to stabilize the induction of electrons from P to O, making P less electrophilic. It is expected that the persistence of V1 is slightly higher than that of VX since the hydrolysis rate of ethyl paraoxon is 1.6 times higher than the one of n-propyl paraoxon in a neutral medium.

The lower volatility and minimal persistence difference makes VX preferable to V1.

== Preparation ==
It is prepared by the same route as VX using propanol instead of ethanol.
