= Newport Chemical Depot =

Chemical storage and destruction facility

Coordinates: 39°51′2.36″N 87°26′16.94″W

The Newport Chemical Depot was a 6,990-acre (28.3 km^{2}) former United States Army installation near Newport, Indiana, in west-central Indiana, about 32 miles (51 km) north of Terre Haute. Originally established during World War II as the Wabash River Ordnance Works, it was built in 1942–1943 by DuPont to produce the military explosive RDX. The plant was mothballed after the war, reactivated for RDX production during the Korean War, and later operated under the name Newport Army Ammunition Plant.

From 1943 to 1946, the site also produced heavy water as part of the Manhattan Project's P-9 Project; production resumed in 1952 for the U.S. nuclear weapons program and ended in 1957. The installation was later used for chemical-weapons activities involving VX nerve agent. Destruction of the VX stored at the depot began in May 2005, using chemical neutralization, and operations to destroy the stored stockpile were completed on August 8, 2008. The depot was deactivated in 2010 following a recommendation for closure by the 2005 Base Realignment and Closure Commission, and the property was subsequently redeveloped as the Vermillion Rise Mega Park.

== History ==
=== Wabash River Ordnance Works ===
Newport was founded during World War II to produce the military high explosive RDX. The site is 6,990 acres (28.3 km^{2}), located in west central Indiana, near the Wabash River, two miles south of Newport, Indiana, and thirty-two miles north of Terre Haute. It was built during 1942–1943 by DuPont, the original operating contractor of the site, and was originally known as the Wabash River Ordnance Works. The site was selected for the availability of labor, its proximity to a railroad line, electric power and water, and its isolated location; furthermore, the location had to be more than 200 miles (320 km) away from any coastal waters or international borders.

Given the immediate need for RDX, the plant was designed to employ the older Woolwich method for manufacturing the explosive. As a result, the plant manufactured lower amounts of RDX compared to the Holston Ordnance Works, which used the more updated Bachmann process.

The government originally acquired 21,986 acres (88.97 km^{2}) to build the plant. Although most of the land was used for farming, there were 66 clusters of buildings, six cemeteries, and one church. The cemeteries, one apparently dating to 1810, were still maintained as of 1998. Construction started January 12, 1942, and production started July 20, 1942.

The plant was mothballed in 1946, but its RDX production was reactivated in 1951 for the Korean War. Production of RDX was suspended again in 1957.

=== Heavy water plant ===
In 1943–1946, the Newport Army Ammunition Plant added a heavy water plant as an element of the Manhattan Project's P-9 Project for construction of nuclear weapons. Heavy water production was suspended in 1946 when the plant was mothballed, but resumed in 1952 to produce heavy water for the U.S. nuclear weapons program. Heavy water production ended in 1957.

=== Production and stockpiling of chemical weapons ===
The Army first built a VX facility at the site in 1959 when it was known as the Newport Chemical Plant. In 1964, the Wabash River Ordnance Works and the Newport Army Chemical Plant were effectively combined and renamed the Newport Army Ammunition Plant.

Beginning in 1961, Newport became a site for chemical weapons manufacturing, producing the entire U.S. stockpile of VX nerve agent at the time. It was also used to store and eventually neutralize 1,269 short tons (1,151 metric tons) of the agent when the U.S. chemical weapons program was shut down. The stored VX amounted to 4.1% of the U.S. stockpile of chemical weapons in 1997 when the Chemical Weapons Convention came into effect.

== Chemical weapons disposal ==
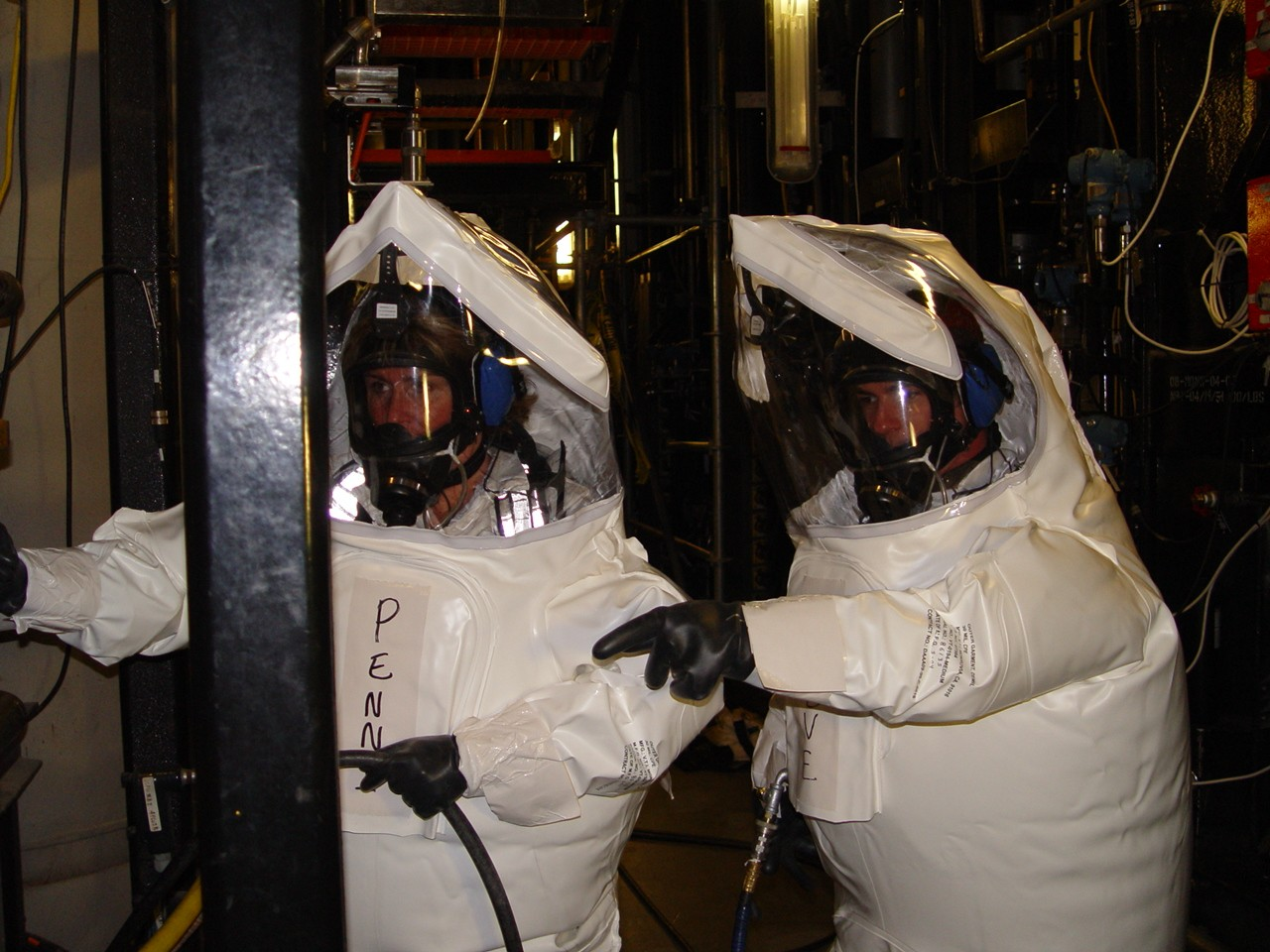
Two workers in demilitarization protective ensemble (DPE) performed maintenance work in an area of the Newport Chemical Agent Disposal Facility (NECDF) where chemical agent may have been present.

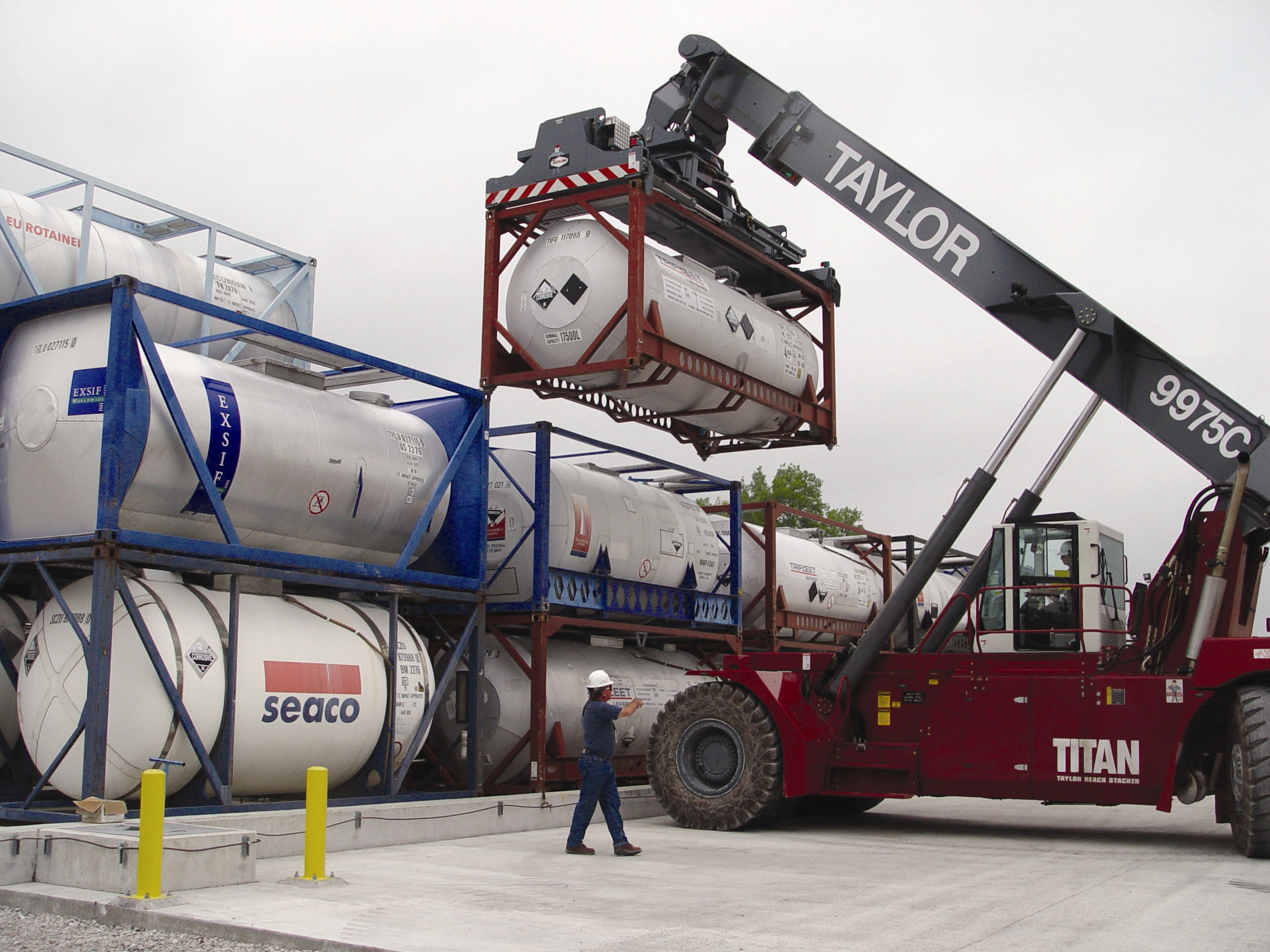
A Newport disposal site employee helped guide a stacker operator as he maneuvered an intermodal (ISO) container filled with hydrolysate.

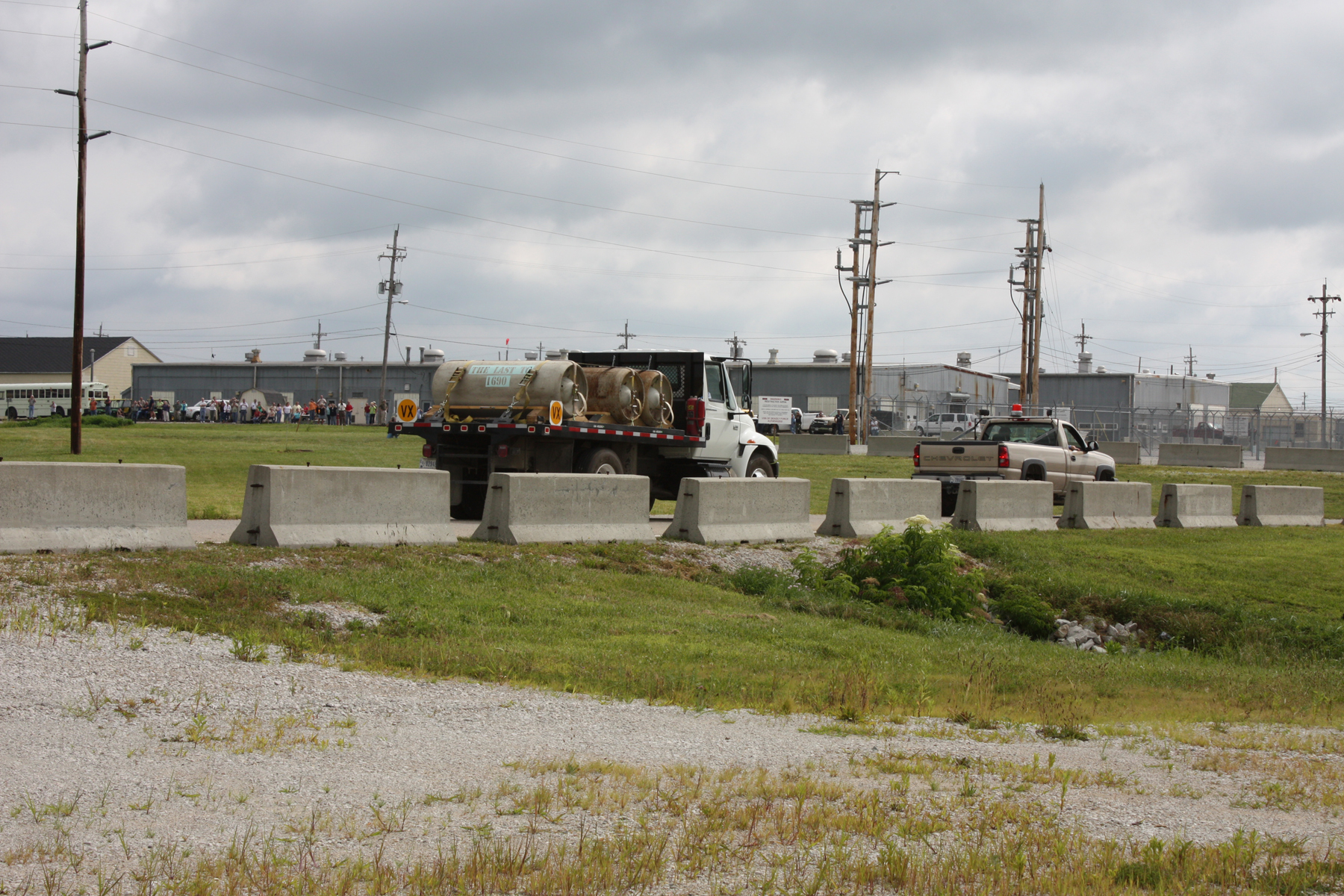
A convoy travels from the storage igloos to the Newport Chemical Agent Disposal Facility, where the VX was neutralized.

The U.S. Army Chemical Materials Agency designed the Newport Chemical Agent Disposal Facility (NECDF) for the sole purpose of destroying the VX chemical agent stored at the Newport Chemical Depot. Construction of the NECDF was completed in June 2003. The Army began VX agent destruction operations in May 2005, and completed operations in August 2008. Destruction was performed on behalf of the U.S. Army Chemical Materials Agency by Parsons Infrastructure & Technology, Inc. and more than 500 civilian employees worked at the facility. NECDF's permit was officially closed in January 2010. The site was the largest employer in Vermillion County between 1941 and its closing, having employed 1,000 workers at its peak.

=== Process ===
The Army employed neutralization for the destruction of the VX chemical agent. The agent was neutralized in steel reactors by thoroughly mixing it with heated sodium hydroxide and water. Control room operators directed and monitored the entire process remotely, using a state-of-the-art control system. Once agent neutralization was verified at the on-site laboratory, the caustic wastewater was placed into on-site intermodal storage containers awaiting transport for final treatment to Veolia Environmental Services in Port Arthur, Texas. This process is a different method than incineration which has been the primary manner of chemical agent destruction at other installations.

=== Delays ===
The start of operations was delayed several years due to problems in the arrangements of the disposal of the wastewater, which was anticipated to contain trace amounts of VX and 4 byproducts (less than 20 parts per million), problems that had not been completely solved at the start of destruction. Permafix and DuPont did not accept the wastewater for treatment, so it was stored on-site until the Army found another disposal option. Waste was eventually shipped to Port Arthur, Texas where it was processed and incinerated by the company Veolia Environmental Services. A lawsuit delayed the implementation of the shipments, but the suit was ultimately dismissed by a federal judge. The Organisation for the Prohibition of Chemical Weapons certified that the stockpile was 100 percent destroyed in September 2009.

=== Incidents ===
A few incidents have occurred during the destruction process, including a 30-gallon spill of VX during processing on June 10, 2005. Further incidents involved spills of the hydrolysate end product. None of these incidents resulted in any injuries.

== Base closure and redevelopment ==
A 2005 BRAC commission report recommended the depot's closure and the Army held a Deactivation Ceremony in June 2010, signifying that all activities required for closure of the NECD had been successfully completed. In preparation for closure, the Newport Chemical Depot Reuse Authority (NeCDRA) was created to complete a reuse master plan for the NECD. NeCDRA and its consultant team worked with the local community to create a plan and implementation strategy for the conversion of the depot to civilian use. NECD's closure led to the loss of over 675 jobs and rural Vermillion County's largest employer.

NeCDRA sought a civilian reuse plan that would replace lost jobs, maintain environmental quality, and be economically viable and obtained partnerships with Duke Energy and Garmong Construction. The depot has since been transformed into Vermillion Rise Mega Park, a 7,100-acre office and industrial park also containing a 2,806-acre habitat for the endangered Indiana bat. As of October 2020, the park hosted six companies and 130 jobs in addition to leasing land for agricultural purposes, supporting related industries. Additionally, NeCDRA has also obtained local infrastructure improvements, such as a $2.4 million waterline project, a $3 million shell building project, and a $12 million 230-69 kV electrical substation.

== Timeline of VX production, storage, and destruction ==
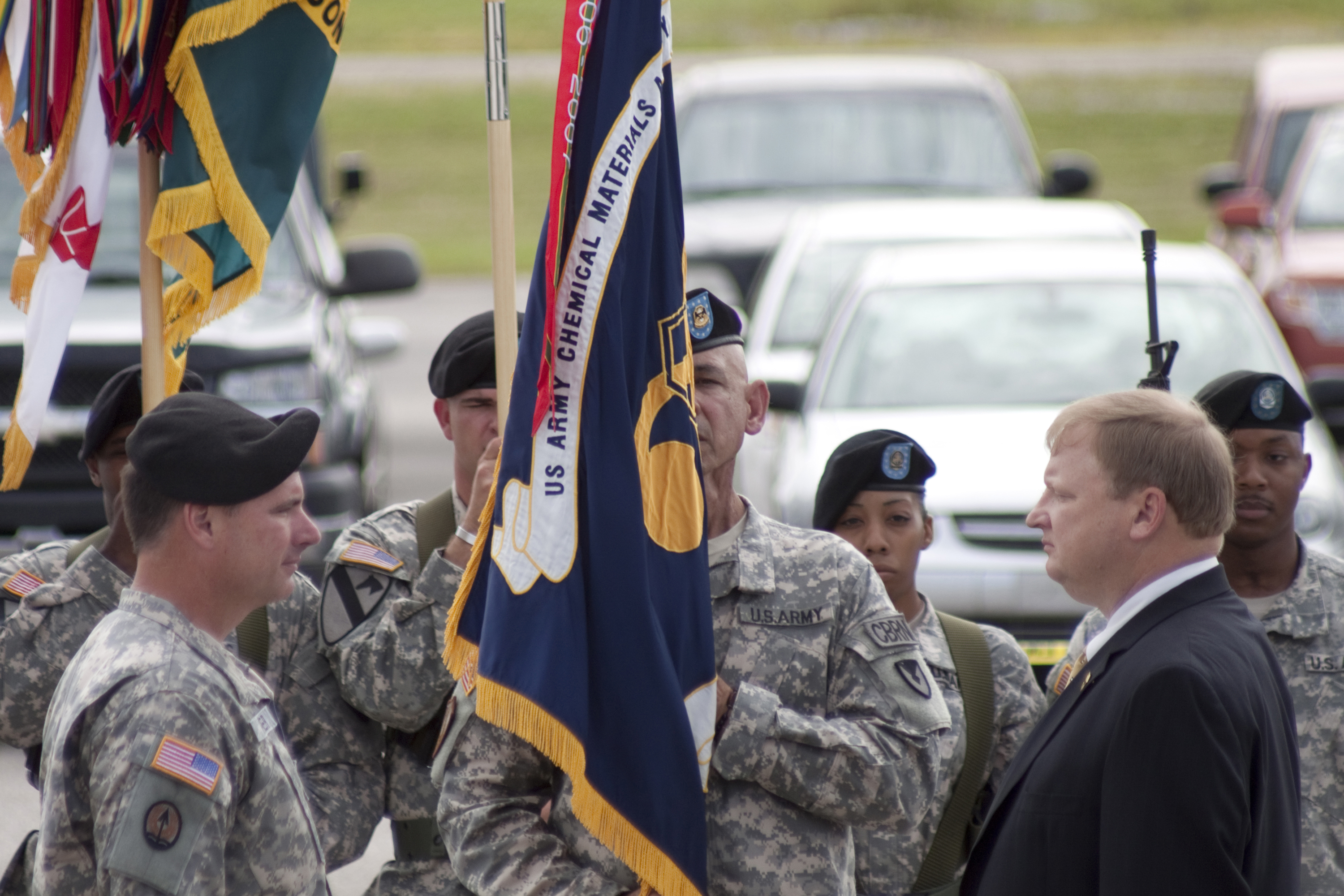
The Newport Chemical Depot (NCD) deactivation ceremony, June 17, 2010.

| Year | Event |
|---|---|
| 1962–1968 | The period of VX production at the Newport Chemical Depot (NCD) is across this span of years. |
| 1969 | President Richard Nixon unilaterally decrees halt to production and transport of chemical weapons, leaving the final two batches of VX at the NCD. |
| 1999 | Parsons Infrastructure & Technology is awarded the contract for the disposal of VX at the NCD. |
| 2001 | 1st Battalion, 502d Infantry of the 101st Airborne Division (Air Assault) arrives to secure the NCD shortly after the 9/11 attacks. The next month, the 1/148 Inf of the Ohio Army National Guard relieved the 101st Airborne. |
| 2002–2003 | 1/194 Field Artillery of the Iowa Army National Guard arrives to protect the depot. |
| 2003–2004 | 2/150 Field Artillery of Indiana Army National Guard arrives to protect the depot |
| 2005 | On May 5, operations began for the neutralization/destruction of the VX at the depot. |
| 2008 | On August 8, all operations to neutralize/destroy all VX stored at the depot were completed. |
| 2010 | On June 17, the depot conducted a deactivation ceremony and announced that it would officially vacate the site on July 18, 2010. |

== See also ==
- United States and weapons of mass destruction
