= QL sulfide =

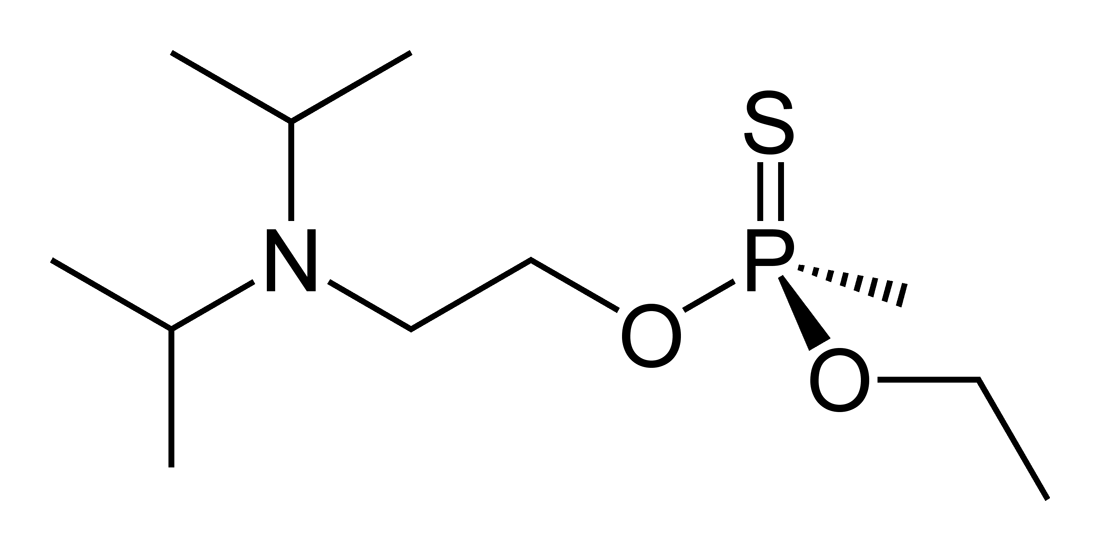

Names
- Preferred IUPAC name N-[2-[ethoxy(methyl)phosphinothioyl]oxyethyl]-N-propan-2-ylpropan-2-amine
- Other names QL sulfide 2-[ethoxy(methyl)thiophosphoryl]oxyethyl-diisopropyl-amine o-[2-(Diisopropylamino)ethyl] o-ethyl methylphosphonothioate

Identifiers
3D model (JSmol)	Interactive image
ChemSpider	499933
PubChem CID	575013
- InChI: InChI=1S/C11H26NO2PS/c1-7-13-15(6,16)14-9-8-12(10(2)3)11(4)5/h10-11H,7-9H2,1-6H3 Key: GDVKPNORZICDJU-UHFFFAOYSA-N
- SMILES: CCOP(=S)(C)OCCN(C(C)C)C(C)C

Properties
Chemical formula	C_{11}H_{26}NO_{2}PS
Molar mass	267.37 g·mol^{−1}
- Except where otherwise noted, data are given for materials in their standard state (at 25 °C [77 °F], 100 kPa). verify (what is ?) Infobox references

QL sulfide (CV), also known as EA-2276, is an isomer of the nerve agent VX. It is a sulfide of the chemical QL, or isopropyl aminoethylmethyl phosphonite.

== Synthesis ==
QL sulfide is manufactured by reacting QL with sulfur.

== Uses in chemical warfare ==
QL sulfide is an isomer of VX and readily converts to it.

The toxicity of QL sulfide is unknown but the fact that it easily isomerizes into VX makes it particularly dangerous.

It is the intermediate in the last step of VX production and binary VX deployment.
