= M110 howitzer =

203 mm Self-propelled artillery

8" M110 self-propelled howitzer
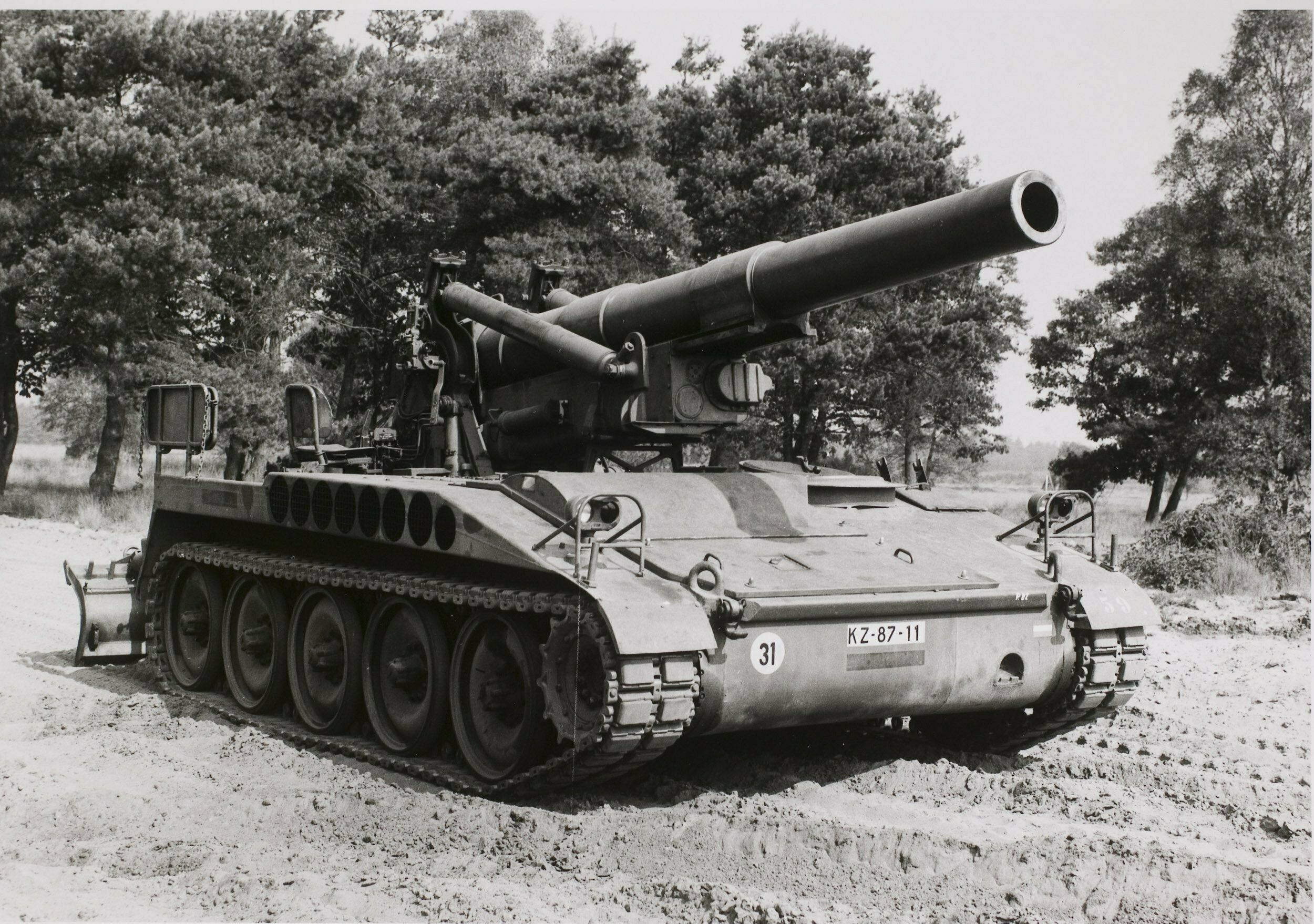
- M110 203 mm self-propelled howitzer of the Royal Netherlands Army
- Type: Self-propelled artillery
- Place of origin: United States

Service history
- Wars: Vietnam War; Yom Kippur War; Iran–Iraq War; 1982 Lebanon War; Kurdish–Turkish conflict (1978–present); Gulf War; 2025 India–Pakistan border skirmishes; Russo-Ukrainian War

Production history
- Manufacturer: General Motors (transmission)

Specifications
- Mass: 31.2 short tons (28.3 t; 27.9 long tons)
- Length: 35 ft 5 in (10.8 m)
- Barrel length: 5.1 m (16 ft 9 in) L/25
- Width: 10 ft 2 in (3.1 m)
- Height: 10 ft 2 in (3.1 m)
- Crew: 13 (driver, 2 gunners, 2 loaders, (8 support crew–other vehicle))
- Caliber: 203 mm (8.0 in)
- Rate of fire: Rapid: 3 per two minutes Regular: 1 round every two minutes
- Effective firing range: 16.8–25 km (10.4–15.5 mi); RAP 30 km (19 mi)
- Armor: .51 in (13 mm)
- Main armament: 8 in (203 mm) M201A1 howitzer
- Secondary armament: none
- Engine: Detroit Diesel 8V71T, 8-cylinder, 2-stroke, turbocharged diesel 405 hp (302 kW)
- Suspension: Torsion bar
- Maximum speed: 30 mph (54.7 km/h)

The 8-inch (203 mm) M110 self-propelled howitzer is an American self-propelled artillery system consisting of an M115 203 mm howitzer installed on a purpose-built chassis. Before its retirement from US service, it was the largest available self-propelled howitzer in the United States Army's inventory; it continues in service with the armed forces of other countries, to which it was exported. Missions include general support, counter-battery fire, and suppression of enemy air defense systems.

== Description ==
According to the operator's manual, the M110's typical rate of fire was three rounds per two minutes when operated at maximum speed, and one round per two minutes with sustained fire. The M110 featured a hydraulically operated rammer to automatically chamber the 200 lb (91 kg)+ projectile. These rammers were prone to breakdown and generally slowed operation of the gun because the rammers required crews to completely lower the massive barrel before using it. Well trained and motivated crews could achieve two to four rounds per minute for short periods by using the manual rammer, essentially a heavy steel pole with a hard rubber pad on one end. Using the manual rammer was physically demanding, but crews were not required to lower the barrels as much as with the hydraulic rammer.

The M110's range varied from 10.4 mi (16.8 km) to approximately 16 mi (25 km) when firing standard projectiles, and up to 19 mi (30 km) when firing rocket-assisted projectiles.

== History ==
"Weapons of the Field Artillery" (1966).

The M110 howitzer first entered service with the U.S. Army in 1963 and was used in the Vietnam War by the United States Army. Later versions were used in the Gulf War - Operation Desert Shield and Operation Desert Storm by Tango Battery 5th Battalion 11th Marines, and the British Army's 32nd Regiment Royal Artillery.

In 1977 the upgraded M110A1 entered service, featuring a longer M201 series barrel which gave it an increased range. The final version, the M110A2, added a double muzzle brake. The M110A2s were made from refitted M110s or M107 175 mm self-propelled guns. The 2nd Battalion 18th Field Artillery (U.S. Army), which inactivated in 1994 at Fort Sill, Oklahoma, and the 5th Battalion 18th Field Artillery served in Desert Storm with the M110A2, as did the 142nd Field Artillery Brigade (Arkansas Army National Guard) and 1st Battalion 181st Field Artillery (Tennessee Army National Guard). Most of the U.S. Army and Marine Corps relied on M109 series 155-millimeter howitzer systems during this conflict, sending remaining M110s to reserve or National Guard units. These units then took possession of M109s as they returned from combat operations. M110s were still in service with the 3rd Battalion 92nd Field Artillery (US Army Reserve) and running fire missions at Camp Atterbury as late as the summer of 1994.

The howitzer has been retired from U.S. Army service, replaced by the M270 multiple launch rocket system.

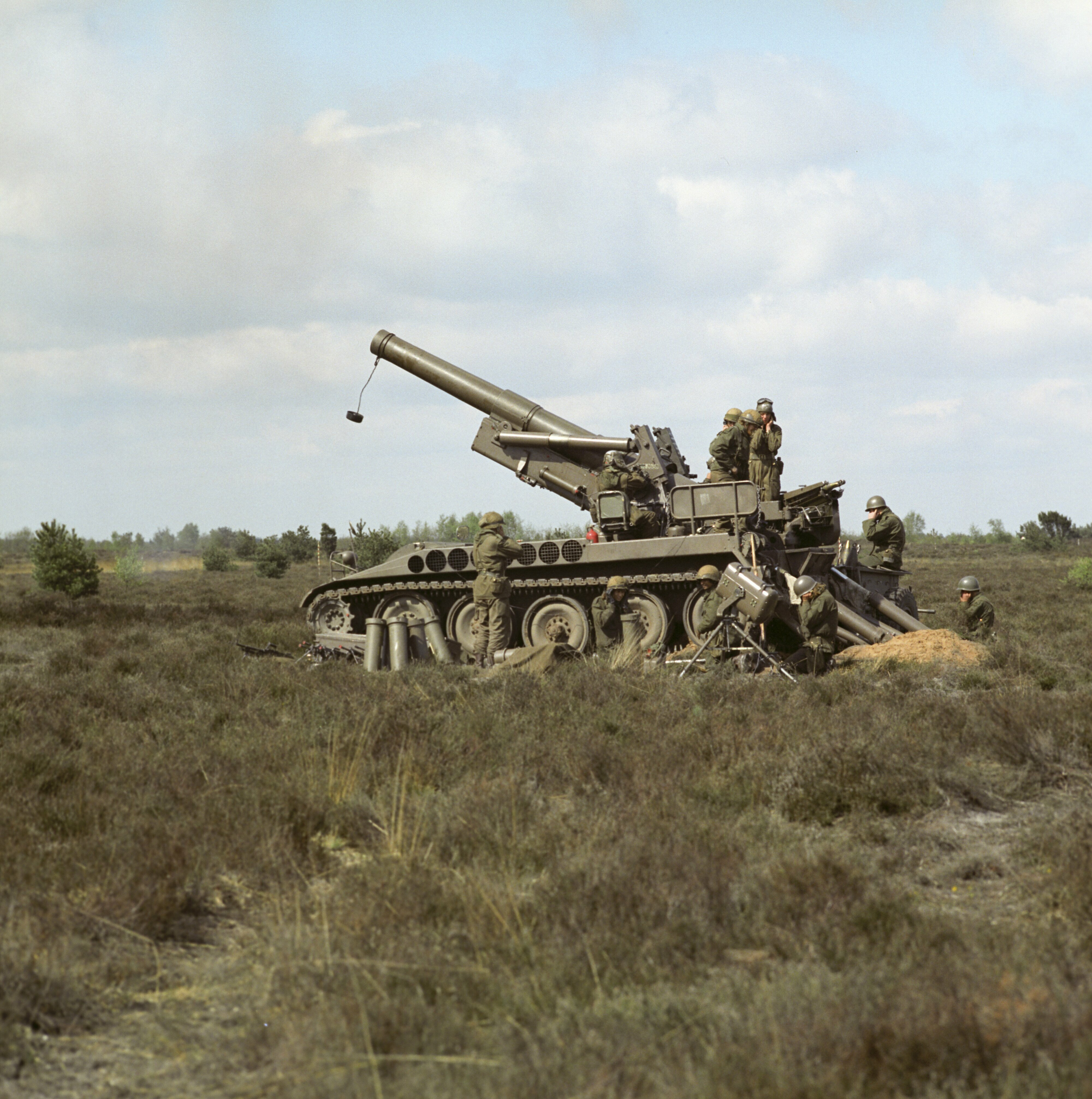
Dutch artillerymen with their M110 in firing position, 1972

At the end of the Cold War under U.S. Division Plan 86, all armored and mechanized infantry divisions included a battalion of heavy artillery that included two batteries of M110A2 SP howitzers with six guns each for a total of 12 guns, plus one battery of nine M270s.

Israel used M110s along with M107s during the Yom Kippur War against Egyptian and Syrian forces. Later, in 1982, Israel used M110 systems against the Palestine Liberation Organization and their Lebanese allies with deadly effect during the Siege of Beirut as part of Operation Peace for Galilee.

Iran used its M110s during its offensives against Iraq in the Iran–Iraq War.

The Turkish Armed Forces have used M110A2 systems against the Kurdistan Workers' Party since the 1990s, as well as in the Turkish military intervention in Syria, mainly against the People's Protection Units.

In the 1990-1991 Gulf War, the M110 had an unusual role. The GBU-28 (Guided Bomb Unit‐28) is a 4,000–5,000-pound (1,800–2,300 kg) class laser-guided "bunker busting" bomb produced originally by the Watervliet Arsenal, Watervliet, New York, built from modified M110 howitzers' barrels and dropped by F-111 aircraft.

In early October 2025, it was reported that Greece was considering selling at least 60 M110A2 guns along with 150,000 M110-compatible artillery shells of various types (M106 HEs, M650 HERAs, M404 ICMs, M509A1 DPICMs), which then would be transferred via the Czech Republic. It was passed through a Parliamentary Standing Committee on Armaments session, with the Council of General Staff Chiefs deeming them as Non-Essential Military Equipment, to be provided to Ukraine "as-is". The Government Council for National Security which has the final say, was expected to convene for a final decision.

In April 2026, Ukraine received an undisclosed number of systems which were put in service with the 52nd Separate Artillery Brigade of the Armed Forces of Ukraine.

== Projectiles ==
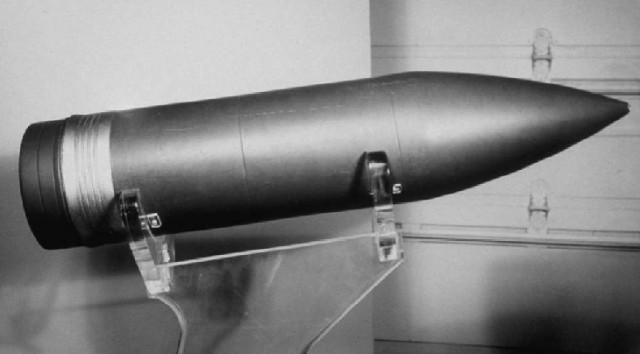
A 203 millimetre W33 nuclear artillery shell on display

- M14 dummy
- M106 HE
- M650 HE rocket assist projectile (RAP)
- M509 ICM
- M404 ICM anti-personnel (airburst)
- M426 agent GB Sarin
- M422A1 Artillery Fired Atomic Projectile
- M424 High Altitude Spotting Round for the M422 projectile
- XM753 Atomic RA (rocket assisted)

== Operators ==
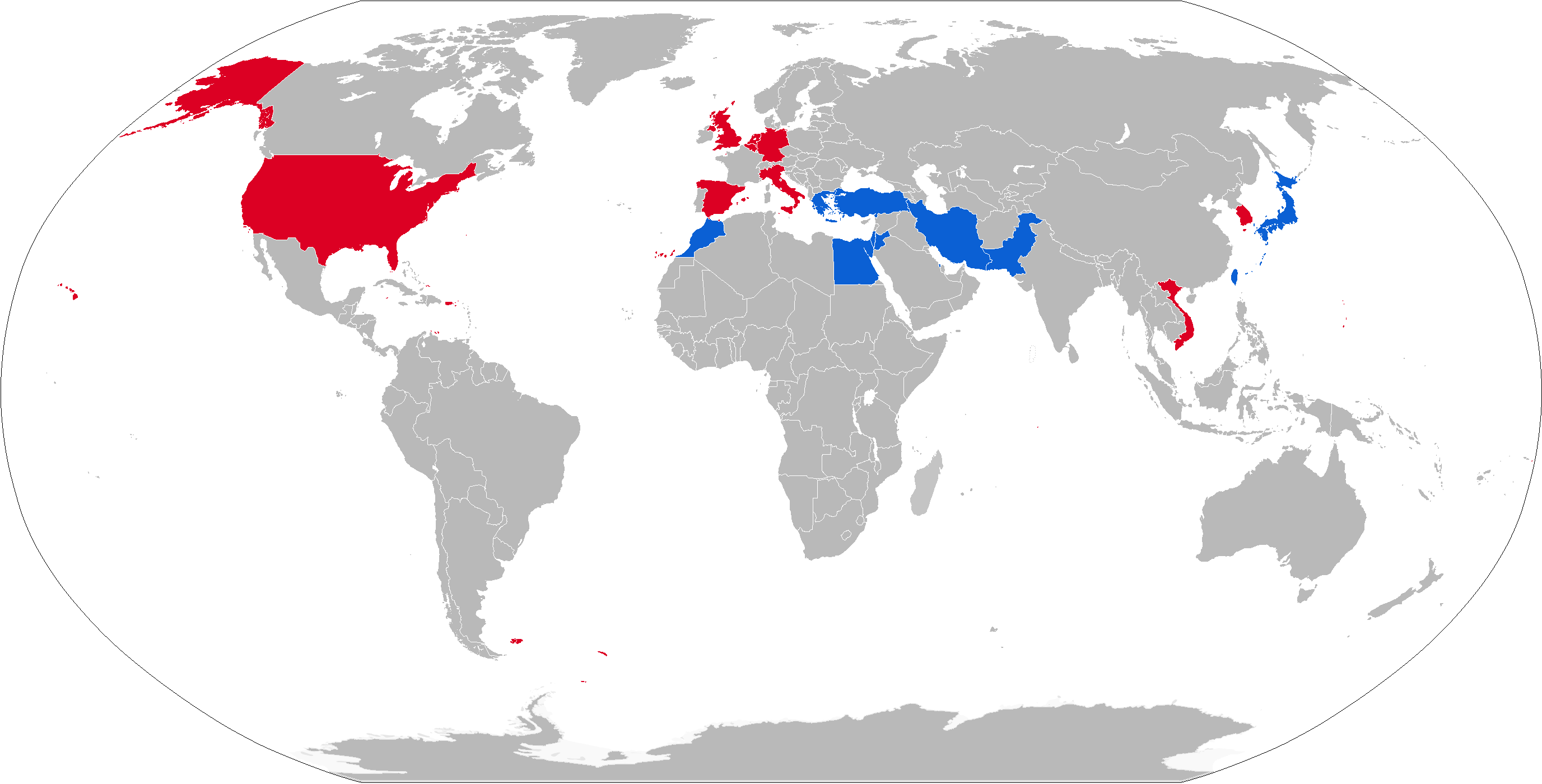
Map with M110 operators in blue and former operators in red

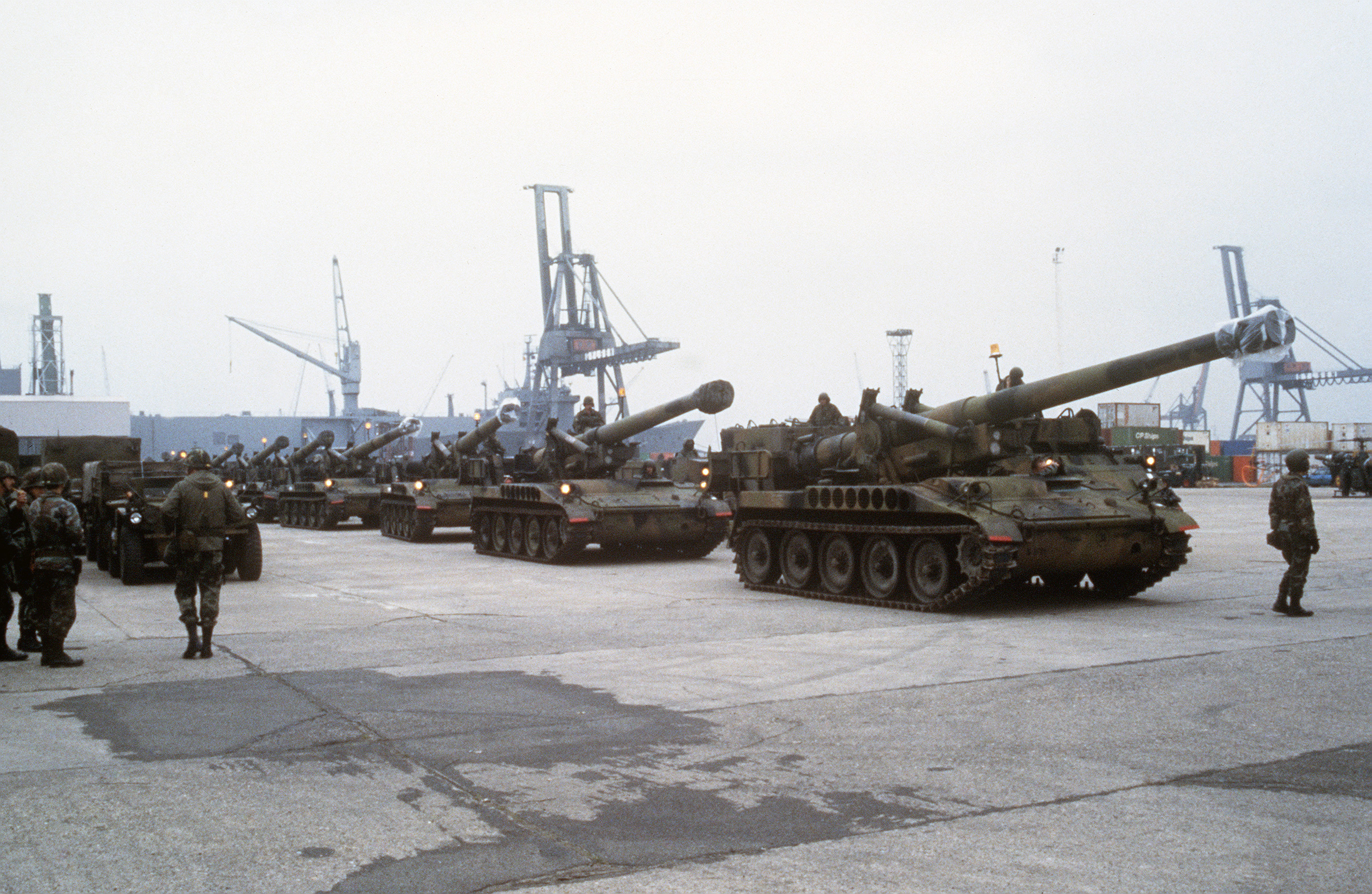
U.S. Army M110A2 howitzers in a staging area prior to transport, Port of Antwerp, 1984

=== Current ===
- Bahrain: Royal Bahraini Army 13 M110A2 from Netherlands delivered in 1994, 25 M110A2 from US delivered in 1996.
- Cyprus: Cypriot National Guard 8 M110A2.
- Greece: Hellenic Army 145 M110A2.
- Egypt: Egyptian Army Received 144 M110A2 as aid in 1996.
- Iran: Iran Army 30 M110.
- Jordan: Jordanian Armed Forces 120 M110A2.
- Morocco: Moroccan Army 60 M110A2.
- Pakistan: Pakistan Army 140 in service as of 2021.
- Taiwan: Republic of China Army 70 M110A2 as of 2023.
- Turkey: Turkish Army currently phasing out 219 as M110A2 in favor of T-155 Fırtına.
- Ukraine: In service with the 52nd Separate Artillery Brigade.

=== Former ===
- Belgium: Belgian Army 11 M110A2 between 1972 and 1993 used by the 20th Artillery Regiment (Belgian Forces in Germany).
- Germany: German Army M110A2 until 1993.
- Israel: Israeli Army 36 M110, retired in 1990s.
- Italy: Italian Army used M110A2s, phased out by 1998.
- Japan: Japan Ground Self-Defense Force 91 M110A2. As of 2023, approximately 10 M110A2s were active, owned by 104th Artillery Battalion of 4th Artillery Group (Mechanized) in Hokkaido. They were retired in March 2024 and the battalion was disbanded.
- South Korea: Republic of Korea Army Operated M110 since 1961. Retired in the late 2000s after being replaced by K9 Thunder.
- South Vietnam: Army of the Republic of Vietnam.
- Netherlands: Royal Netherlands Army M110A1 and M110A2, replaced by the M109 in the 1990s
- Spain: Spanish Army as 64 M110A2, deployed in divisional fire support regiments until 2009.
- United Kingdom: British Army as M110A2 firing high explosive and nuclear shells only. (The FV433 Abbot SPG, the M109A2, and the M110A1 were replaced by the AS-90 in the early-mid-1990s.) Used in Operation Granby/Gulf War.
- United States: Used by United States Army and United States Marine Corps, M110A2s retired in 1994.

== See also ==
- List of U.S. military vehicles by model number
- 2S7 Pion – Soviet L/55.3 203 mm self-propelled cannon
- 2S4 Tyulpan – Soviet 240 mm self-propelled mortar
- List of crew-served weapons of the US Armed Forces
- M55 – 203 mm self-propelled gun, predecessor to the M110
- M107 – a 175 mm self-propelled gun on the same chassis
- Sholef – Israeli 155 mm self-propelled howitzer
- T92 Howitzer Motor Carriage – a 240 mm howitzer M1 fitted on a M26 Pershing chassis
