= QL (chemical) =

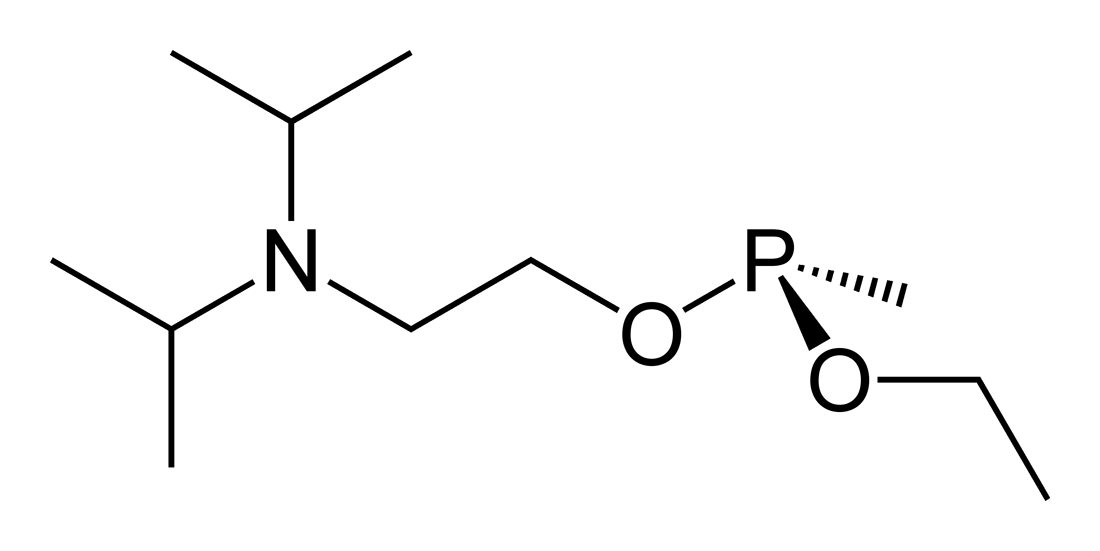

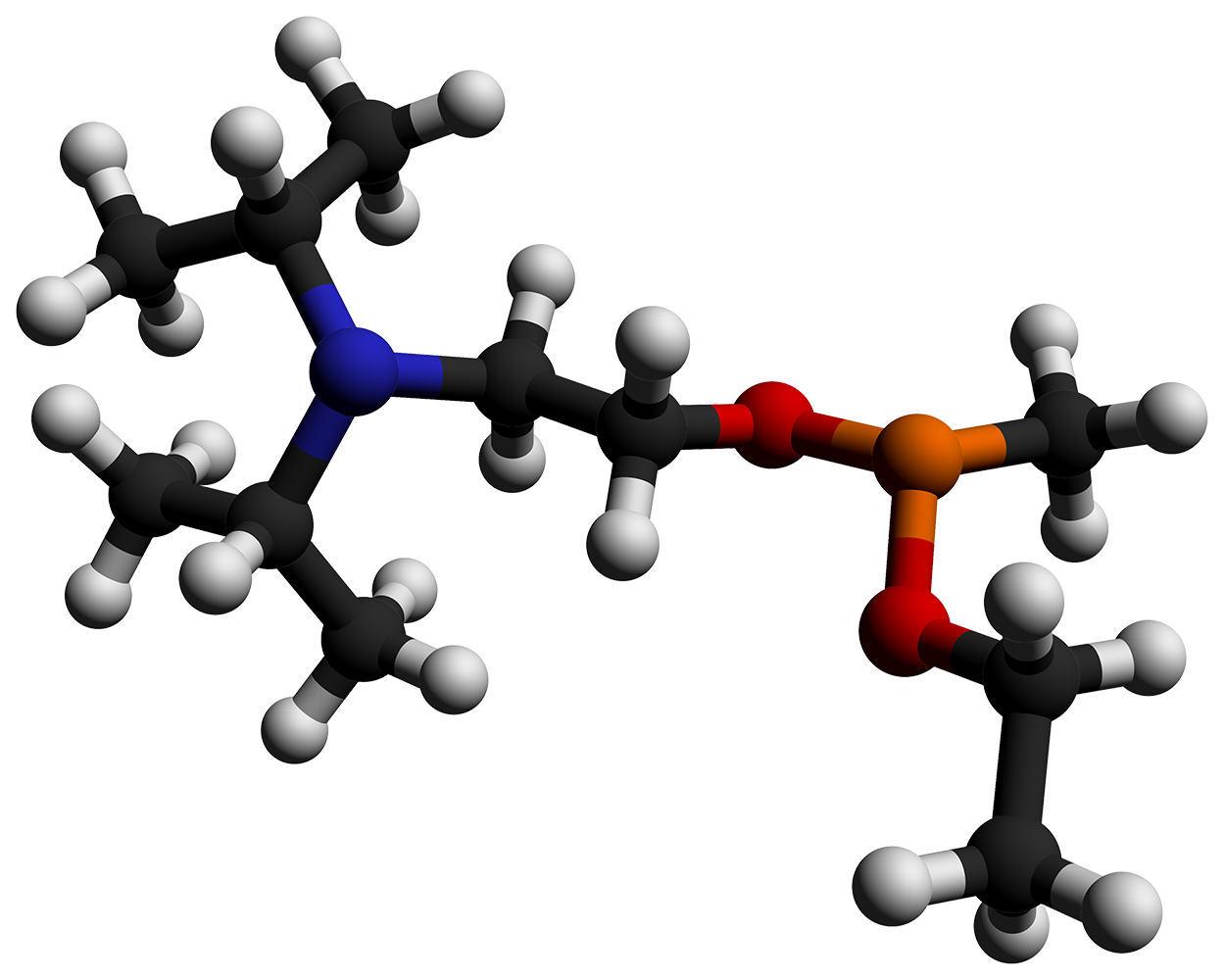

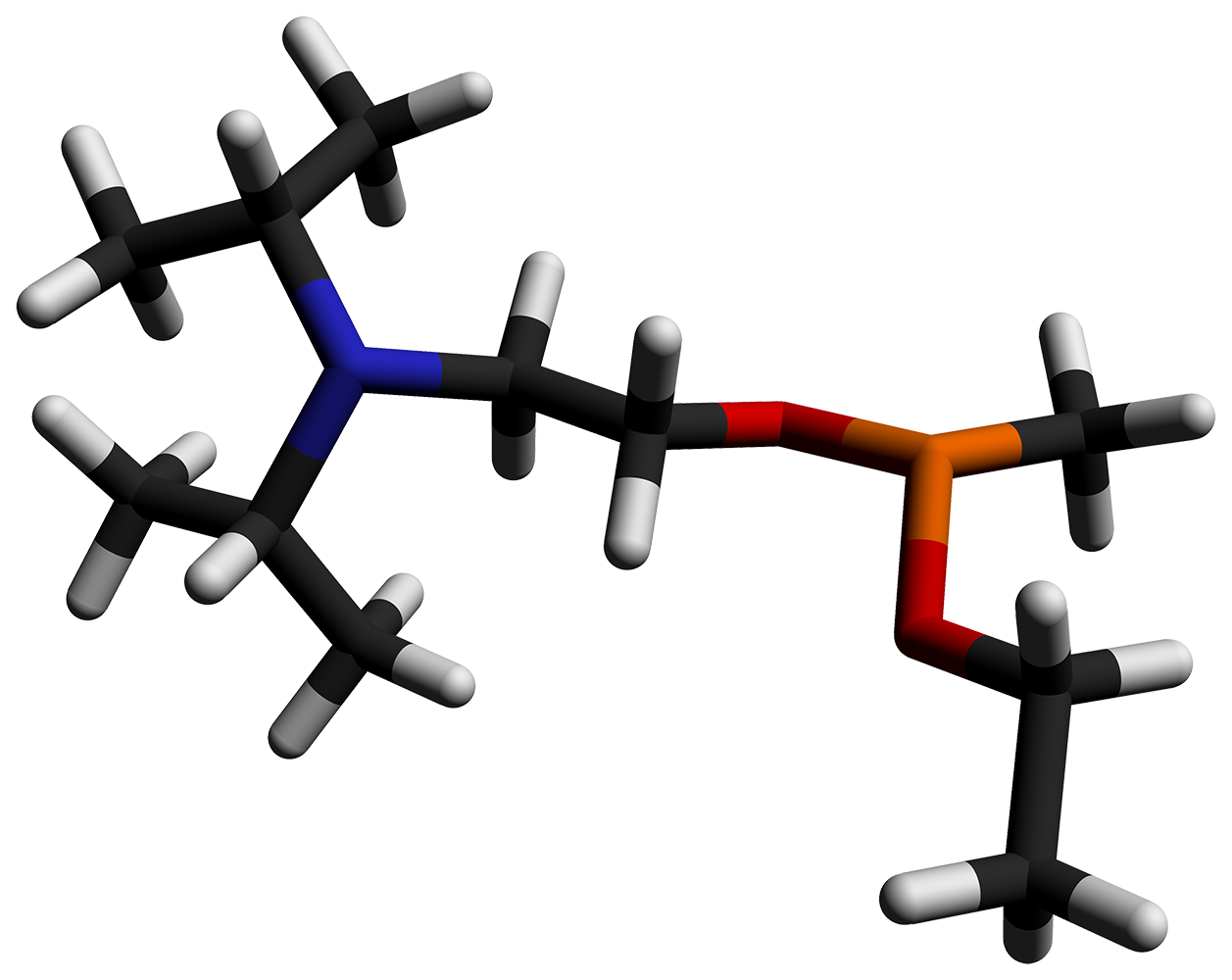

Names
- Preferred IUPAC name 2-[Di(propan-2-yl)amino]ethyl ethyl methylphosphonite
- Other names 2-(Diisopropylamino)ethyl ethyl methylphosphonite N-[2-(Ethoxy(methyl)phosphanyl)oxyethyl]-N-isopropyl-propan-2-amine; Isopropyl aminoethylmethyl phosphonite O-(2-Diisopropylaminoethyl) O'-ethyl methylphosphonite

Identifiers
CAS Number	57856-11-8
3D model (JSmol)	Interactive image
Abbreviations	QL
ChemSpider	148925
PubChem CID	170325
UNII	8154M6X68L
CompTox Dashboard (EPA)	DTXSID70866655
- InChI: InChI=1S/C11H26NO2P/c1-7-13-15(6)14-9-8-12(10(2)3)11(4)5/h10-11H,7-9H2,1-6H3 Key: OIQVKKOBTVZIFE-UHFFFAOYSA-N; InChI=1/C11H26NO2P/c1-7-13-15(6)14-9-8-12(10(2)3)11(4)5/h10-11H,7-9H2,1-6H3 Key: OIQVKKOBTVZIFE-UHFFFAOYAN
- SMILES: O(P(OCCN(C(C)C)C(C)C)C)CC

Properties
Chemical formula	C_{11}H_{26}NO_{2}P
Molar mass	235.308 g·mol^{−1}
Appearance	Colorless liquid
Odor	Strong fishy odor
Boiling point	230 °C (446 °F; 503 K)
Solubility in water	Slightly soluble in water
- Except where otherwise noted, data are given for materials in their standard state (at 25 °C [77 °F], 100 kPa). verify (what is ?) Infobox references

Isopropyl aminoethylmethyl phosphonite (NATO designation QL), also known as O-(2-diisopropylaminoethyl) O′-ethyl methylphosphonite, is a precursor chemical to the nerve agent VX and VR-56. It is a colorless liquid with a strong fishy odor, and is slightly soluble in water.

== Synthesis ==
QL is manufactured by the transesterification of diethyl methylphosphonite with 2-(diisopropylamino)ethanol.

== Uses in chemical warfare ==
QL is a component in binary chemical weapons, mainly VX nerve agent. It, along with methylphosphonyl difluoride (DF), was developed during the 1980s in order to replace an aging stockpile of unitary chemical weapons. QL is listed as a Schedule 1 chemical by the Chemical Weapons Convention.

== Toxicity ==
QL itself is a relatively non-toxic chemical. However, when reacting with sulfur, the corresponding sulfide of QL isomerizes into the highly toxic VX molecule.
