= EA-2192 =

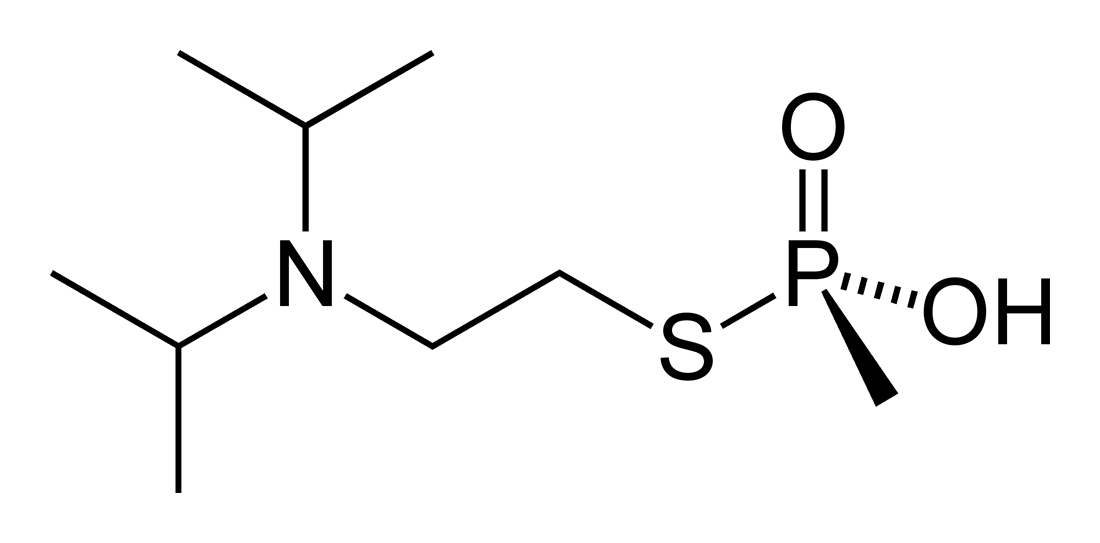

Names
- Preferred IUPAC name S-{2-[Di(propan-2-yl)amino]ethyl} methylphosphonothioate
- Other names Diisopropylaminoethyl methyl thiolophosphonate

Identifiers
CAS Number	73207-98-4
3D model (JSmol)	Interactive image
ChemSpider	46845
PubChem CID	51760
UNII	5J7SBT85UY
CompTox Dashboard (EPA)	DTXSID00223454
- InChI: InChI=1S/C9H22NO2PS/c1-8(2)10(9(3)4)6-7-14-13(5,11)12/h8-9H,6-7H2,1-5H3,(H,11,12) Key: UOXJNGFFPMOZDM-UHFFFAOYSA-N
- SMILES: CC(C)N(CCSP(=O)(C)O)C(C)C

Properties
Chemical formula	C_{9}H_{22}NO_{2}PS
Molar mass	239.31 g·mol^{−1}
Appearance	White solid
Solubility in water	Very soluble

Hazards
- Occupational safety and health (OHS/OSH)
Main hazards	Extremely toxic
- Lethal dose or concentration (LD, LC)
LD_{50} (median dose)	630 μg/kg (Rat, oral); 18 μg/kg (Rat, iv); 50 μg/kg (Mouse, iv)
- Except where otherwise noted, data are given for materials in their standard state (at 25 °C [77 °F], 100 kPa). Infobox references

EA-2192 is an extremely toxic degradation product of VX, a very potent nerve agent. It is a white solid that is very soluble and stable in water.

EA-2192 is an extremely potent acetylcholinesterase inhibitor. It is almost as toxic as VX itself, but it is inferior in dermal penetration.

EA-2192 instantly ages acetylcholinesterase as it is the dealkylated form of VX and can also not be reversed with common oxime reactivators.

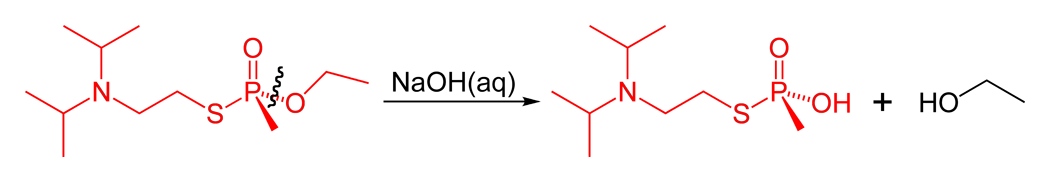
EA-2192 from VX

== See also ==
- Nerve agent
