= M426 8-inch shell =

Chemical artillery shell

The M426 8-inch shell was a 203 mm (8.0 in) chemical artillery shell designed for use by the U.S. Army. It was designed to be used with approximately 14.5 lb (6.6 kg) of GB or VX (nerve agent).
