= Chinese VX =

Nerve agent

Names
- Preferred IUPAC name O-Butyl S-[2-(diethylamino)ethyl] methylphosphonothioate
- Other names CVX; EA-6043

Identifiers
CAS Number	468712-10-9
3D model (JSmol)	Interactive image
ChemSpider	486553
PubChem CID	559704
CompTox Dashboard (EPA)	DTXSID001336412
- InChI: InChI=1S/C11H26NO2PS/c1-5-8-10-14-15(4,13)16-11-9-12(6-2)7-3/h5-11H2,1-4H3 Key: BTVFLPKWKJBKNN-UHFFFAOYSA-N
- SMILES: CCCCOP(=O)(C)SCCN(CC)CC

Properties
Chemical formula	C_{11}H_{26}NO_{2}PS
Molar mass	267.37 g·mol^{−1}
- Except where otherwise noted, data are given for materials in their standard state (at 25 °C [77 °F], 100 kPa). Infobox references

Chinese VX (CVX), also known as EA-6043, is an organophosphate nerve agent of the V-series. It is a structural isomer of both VX and Russian VX.

== See also ==
- VX (nerve agent)
- VR (nerve agent)
