= VX (nerve agent) =

Chemical compound and chemical warfare nerve agent

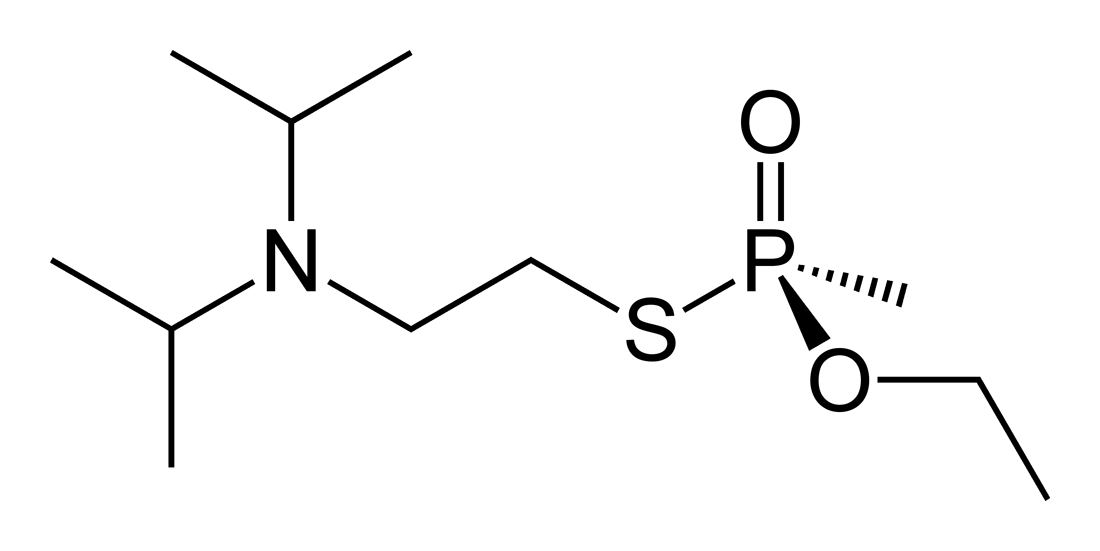
- Stereo structural formula VX ((S)-phosphinate) S_{P}-(−)-VX enantiomer

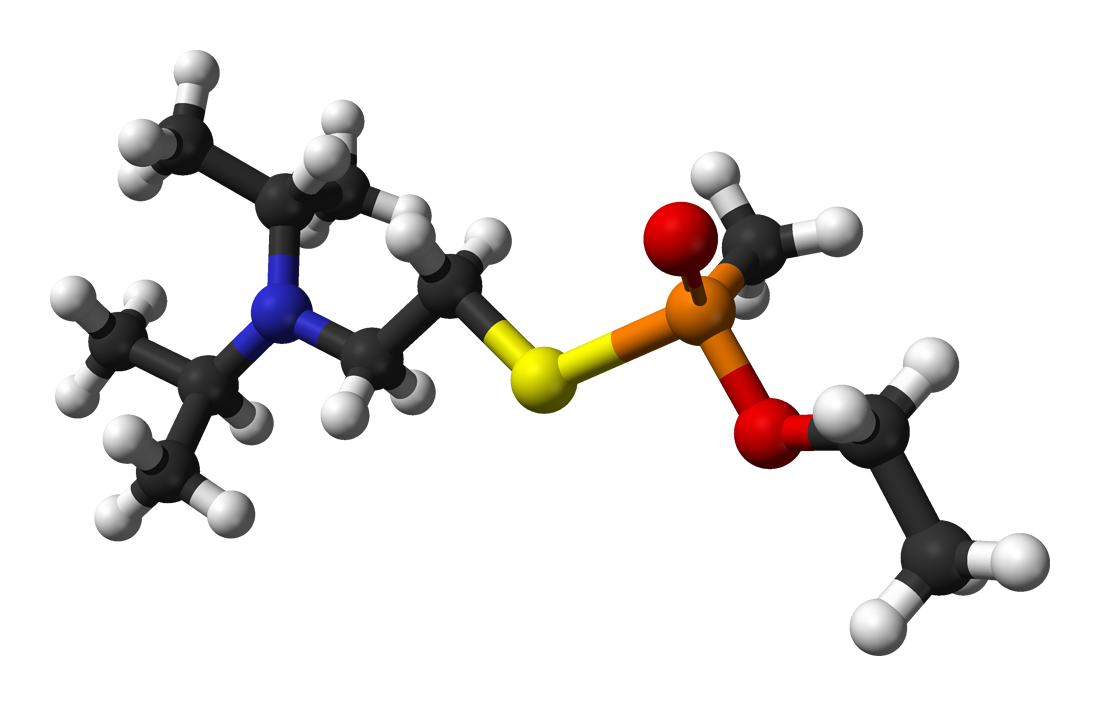
- Ball and stick model of VX ((R)-phosphinate)

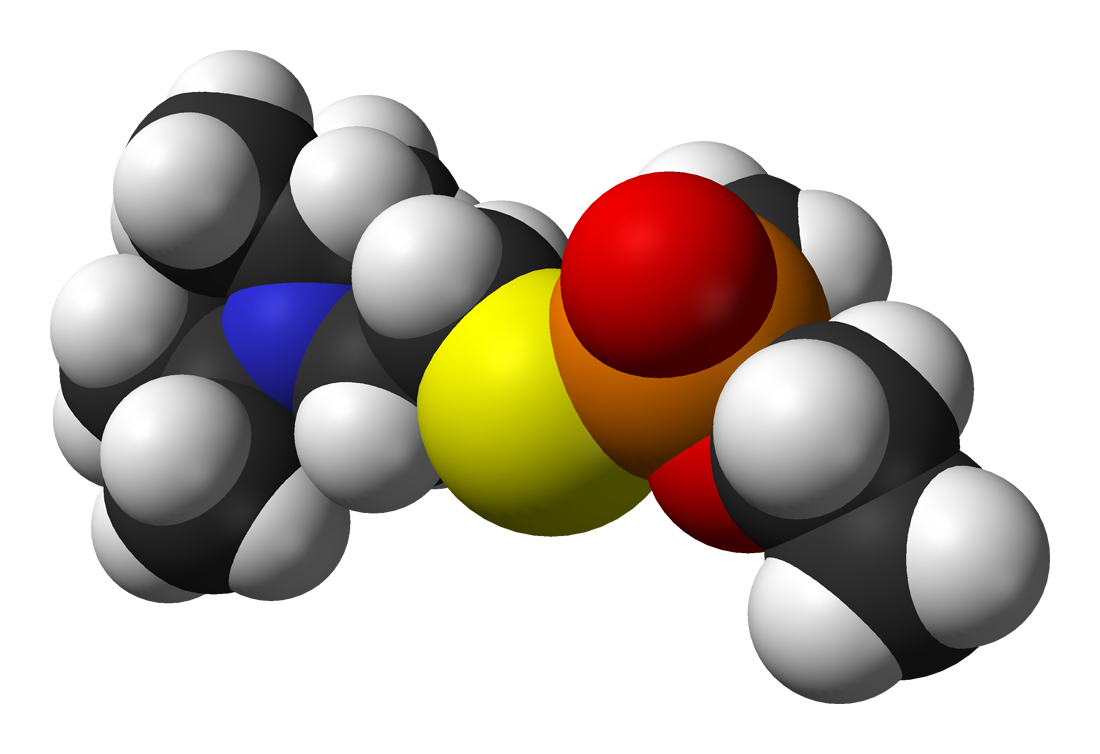

Names
- Preferred IUPAC name S-{2-[Di(propan-2-yl)amino]ethyl} O-ethyl methylphosphonothioate
- Other names [2-(Diisopropylamino)ethyl]-O-ethyl methylphosphonothioate Ethyl {[2-(diisopropylamino)ethyl]sulfanyl}(methyl)phosphinate Ethyl N-2-diisopropylaminoethyl methylphosphonothiolate

Identifiers
CAS Number	50782-69-9
3D model (JSmol)	Interactive image; Interactive image
ChEBI	CHEBI:136185
ChEMBL	ChEMBL483105
ChemSpider	36386
MeSH	VX
PubChem CID	39793
UNII	9A4381183B
CompTox Dashboard (EPA)	DTXSID80866161
- InChI: InChI=1S/C11H26NO2PS/c1-7-14-15(6,13)16-9-8-12(10(2)3)11(4)5/h10-11H,7-9H2,1-6H3 Key: JJIUCEJQJXNMHV-UHFFFAOYSA-N; InChI=1/C11H26NO2PS/c1-7-14-15(6,13)16-9-8-12(10(2)3)11(4)5/h10-11H,7-9H2,1-6H3 Key: JJIUCEJQJXNMHV-UHFFFAOYAV
- SMILES: CCOP(C)(=O)SCCN(C(C)C)C(C)C; O=P(OCC)(SCCN(C(C)C)C(C)C)C

Properties
Chemical formula	C_{11}H_{26}NO_{2}PS
Molar mass	267.37 g·mol^{−1}
Appearance	amber liquid
Odor	odorless
Density	1.0083 g cm^{−3}
Melting point	−51 °C (−60 °F; 222 K)
Boiling point	300 °C (572 °F; 573 K)
log P	2.047
Vapor pressure	0.09 Pa

Hazards
NFPA 704 (fire diamond)	4 1 1
Flash point	159 °C (318 °F; 432 K)
- Lethal dose or concentration (LD, LC)
LD_{50} (median dose)	7 μg/kg (intravenous, rat)
- Except where otherwise noted, data are given for materials in their standard state (at 25 °C [77 °F], 100 kPa). verify (what is ?) Infobox references

VX is an extremely toxic synthetic chemical compound in the organophosphorus class, specifically, a thiophosphonate. In the class of nerve agents, it was developed for military use in chemical warfare after translation of earlier discoveries of organophosphate toxicity in pesticide research. In its pure form, VX is an oily, relatively non-volatile liquid that is amber-like in colour. Because of its low volatility, VX persists in environments where it is dispersed.

The substance is lethal in very small quantities: fatalities occur with exposure to tens of milligrams of VX via inhalation or absorption through skin. It is more potent than sarin, another nerve agent with a similar mechanism of action. On such exposure, these agents severely disrupt the body's signaling between the nervous and muscular systems, leading to a prolonged neuromuscular blockade, flaccid paralysis of all the muscles in the body including the diaphragm, and death by asphyxiation.

VX, short for "venomous agent X", is one of the best known of the V nerve agents and originated from pesticide development work at Imperial Chemical Industries (ICI). It was developed further at Porton Down in England during the early 1950s, based on research first done by Gerhard Schrader, a chemist working for IG Farben in Germany during the 1930s. It is now one of a broader V-series of agents which are classified as nerve agents. VX has been allegedly used in warfare and has been used in several assassinations.

As it is dangerous due to its persistence rather than as a vapor hazard, VX is considered an area denial weapon. As a chemical weapon, it is categorized as a weapon of mass destruction by the United Nations and is banned by the Chemical Weapons Convention of 1993, where production and stockpiling of VX exceeding 100 grams (3.53 oz) per year is outlawed. The only exception is for "research, medical or pharmaceutical purposes outside a single small-scale facility in aggregate quantities not exceeding 10 kg (22 lb) per year per facility".

During the Cold War, the United States chemical weapons program concentrated on large-scale VX production, producing at least 4,400 tons, alongside sarin and mustard gas. The Soviet chemical weapons program declared production of 15,557 tons of the similar VR nerve agent, also called "Russian VX". There are unconfirmed reports VX was used by Cuban forces in the Angolan Civil War, and by Iraqi forces in the Iran–Iraq War. The first confirmed attacks and killing using VX were strings of assassination attempts by Aum Shinrikyo, a Japanese doomsday cult, in 1994 and 1995. Three men were hospitalized and one died four days later. In 2017, Kim Jong Nam was assassinated using VX in Kuala Lumpur International Airport, and died within fifteen minutes of exposure.

== Physical properties ==
VX is an odorless and tasteless chiral organophosphorous chemical with a molecular weight of 267.37 g/mol. Under standard conditions it is an amber-coloured liquid with a boiling point of 298 °C (568 °F), and a freezing point of −51 °C (−60 °F). Its density is similar to that of water. It has a log P value of 2.047, meaning it is relatively hydrophobic with about 100-fold more partitioning into octanol, over water. Its low vapor pressure of 0.09 pascals (1.3×10^{−5} psi) gives it a low volatility, resulting in a high persistence in the environment.

When weaponized, it can be dispersed as a liquid, aerosol or as a mixture with a clay or talc thickening agent.

== Mechanism of action ==
VX is an acetylcholinesterase inhibitor. It blocks the function of the enzyme acetylcholinesterase (AChE). Normally, when a motor neuron is stimulated, it releases the neurotransmitter acetylcholine (ACh) into the space between the neuron and an adjacent muscle cell, the synaptic cleft. When acetylcholine binds to nicotinic receptors at the neuromuscular junction, it stimulates muscle contraction. To avoid a state of constant muscle contraction, the acetylcholine is then broken down (hydrolysed) into the inactive substances acetic acid and choline by AChE. VX blocks the action of AChE, resulting in an accumulation of acetylcholine in the space between the neuron and muscle cell. On a molecular level, this leads to the ongoing stimulation and eventual fatigue of all affected muscarinic and nicotinic ACh receptors. This results in initial violent contractions, followed by sustained supercontraction restricted to the fluid (sarcoplasm) of the subjunctional endplate and prolonged, depolarizing neuromuscular blockade. The prolonged blockade results in flaccid paralysis of all the muscles in the body, and it is such sustained paralysis of the diaphragm muscle that causes death by asphyxiation. Accumulation of acetylcholine in the brain also causes neuronal excitotoxicity, due to activation of nicotinic receptors and glutamate release.

The extreme toxicity of VX is partly due to the fact that the inhibitor was designed to be an excellent structural mimic for the transition state of the natural substrate (acetylcholine) of acetylcholinesterase. VX has a very high "on-rate" to react with the target enzyme and form a stable P-O-C bond (phosphorylation). However, compared with other highly toxic nerve agents like soman or sarin, VX undergoes relatively slow "aging". Aging is a time-dependent side reaction (loss of an alkoxyl group) that occurs on nerve agents after phosphorylation and renders the nerve agent-acetylcholinesterase complex highly resistant to regeneration by any known antidote. Slower aging by VX suggests it should be possible to develop more effective antidotes and treatments.

The reaction products of acetylcholinesterase with VX before and after the "aging" reaction were solved in near atomic resolution by X-ray crystallography to aid in antidote development. The X-ray structures revealed the specific parts of the VX molecule that interact with key residues and sub-sites of the target enzyme. The structural kinetic of phosphorylation followed by aging also showed an unexpected conformational change in the catalytic triad suggestive of an "induced fit" between the VX molecule and acetylcholinesterase.

== Chemistry ==
=== Synthesis ===
VX is chiral at its phosphorus atom. The individual enantiomers are identified as S_{P}-(−)-VX, and R_{P}-(+)-VX (where the "P" subscript highlights that the chirality is at phosphorus).

VX is produced via the transester process, which gives a racemic mixture of the two enantiomers. This entails a series of steps whereby phosphorus trichloride is methylated to produce methyl phosphonous dichloride. The resulting material is reacted with ethanol to form a diester. This is then transesterified with N,N-diisopropylaminoethanol to produce QL, a mixed phosphonite. Finally, this immediate precursor is reacted with sulfur to form VX.

VX can also be delivered in binary chemical weapons which mix in-flight to form the agent prior to release. Binary VX is referred to as VX2, and is created by mixing QL with sulfur as is done in the Bigeye aerial chemical bomb. It may also be produced by mixing with sulfur compounds, as with the liquid dimethyl polysulfide mixture (known as NM) in the canceled XM736 8-inch projectile program.

=== Solvolysis ===
Like other organophosphorus nerve agents, VX may be destroyed by reaction with strong nucleophiles. The reaction of VX with concentrated aqueous sodium hydroxide results in two competing solvolysis reactions: cleavage of either the P–O or P–S esters. Although the P–S cleavage is the dominant pathway, the product of P–O bond cleavage is the toxic phosphonic thioester EA-2192 and both reactions are slow. In contrast, reaction with the hydroperoxide anion (hydroperoxidolysis) leads to exclusive cleavage of the P–S bond and a more rapid overall reaction.

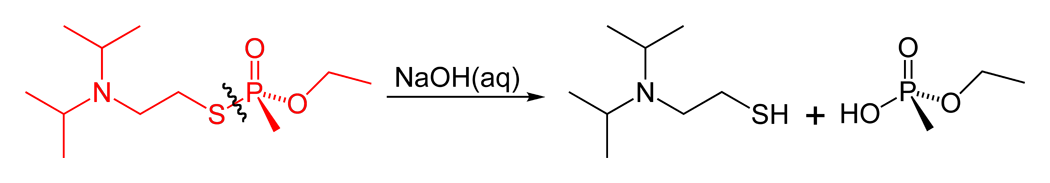
P–S cleavage (non-toxic products)

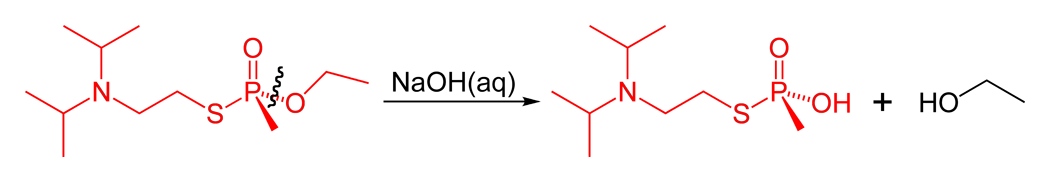
P-O cleavage (EA-2192 product is still toxic)

=== Symptoms of exposure ===
Early symptoms of skin contact include local sweating and muscular twitching at the area of exposure, followed by nausea or vomiting. Early symptoms of exposure to VX vapor include rhinorrhea (runny nose) and tightness in the chest with shortness of breath (bronchial constriction). Miosis (pinpointing of the pupils) may be an early sign of agent exposure but is not usually used as the only indicator of exposure.

=== Toxicology ===
VX is extremely toxic. The potentially fatal dose is only slightly higher than the dose having any effect at all, and the effects of a fatal dose are so rapid that there is little time for treatment. The median lethal dose (LD_{50}), the exposure required to kill half of a tested population, as estimated for 70 kg human males via exposure to the skin is reported to be 5 to 10 mg.

=== Treatment ===
When treating VX exposure, primary consideration is given to removal of the liquid agent from the skin, before removal of the individual to an uncontaminated area or atmosphere. After this, the victim is decontaminated by washing the contaminated areas with household bleach and flushing with clean water, followed by removal of contaminated clothing and further skin decontamination. When possible, decontamination is completed before the casualty is taken for further medical treatment.

An individual known to have been exposed to a nerve agent, or who exhibits definite signs or symptoms of nerve-agent exposure is generally given the antidotes atropine and pralidoxime (2-PAM), and in the case of convulsions an injected sedative or antiepileptic such as diazepam. In several nations the nerve agent antidotes are issued for military personnel in the form of an autoinjector such as the United States military Mark I NAAK.

Atropine blocks a subset of acetylcholine receptors known as muscarinic acetylcholine receptors (mAchRs), so that the buildup of acetylcholine produced by loss of the acetylcholinesterase function has a reduced effect on their target receptor. 2-PAM reactivates the acetylcholinesterase enzyme (AChE), thus reversing the effects of VX. VX and other organophosphates block AChE activity by binding to and covalently inactivating the enzyme via transfer of the phosphonate moiety from VX to the active site of AChE; this inactivates AChE and produces an inactive by-product from the remaining portion of the VX molecule. Pralidoxime (2-PAM) removes this phosphate group.

=== Diagnostic tests ===
Ethyl methylphosphonic acid. R1 = ethyl, R2 = hydrogen, R3 = methyl.

Controlled studies in humans have shown that minimally toxic doses cause 70–75% depression of erythrocyte cholinesterase within several hours of exposure. The serum level of ethyl methylphosphonic acid (EMPA), a VX hydrolysis product, was measured to confirm exposure in one poisoning victim. There also exist procedures for determination of VX hydrolysis products in urine and of VX adducts to albumin in blood.

== History ==
=== Discovery ===
The chemists Ranajit Ghosh and J. F. Newman discovered the V-series nerve agents at the British firm ICI in 1952, patenting diethyl S-2-diethylaminoethyl phosphonothioate (agent VG) in November 1952. Further commercial research on similar compounds ceased in 1955 when its lethality to humans was discovered. The U.S. started production of large amounts of VX in 1961 at Newport Chemical Depot.

The discovery occurred when the chemists were investigating a class of organophosphate compounds (organophosphate esters of substituted aminoethanethiols). Like Gerhard Schrader, an earlier investigator of organophosphates, Ghosh found that they were quite effective pesticides. In 1954, ICI put one of them on the market under the trade name Amiton. It was subsequently withdrawn, as it was too toxic for safe use. The toxicity did not go unnoticed, and samples of it were sent to the British government research facility at Porton Down in Wiltshire for evaluation. After the evaluation was complete, several members of this class of compounds became a new group of nerve agents, the V agents. The best-known of these is probably VX, assigned the UK Rainbow Code Purple Possum, with the Russian V-Agent (VR) coming a close second (Amiton is largely forgotten as VG). The name is a contraction of the words "venomous agent X".

Beginning in 1959, the United States Army began volunteer testing of VX in humans. Dr. Van M. Sim underwent an intravenous infusion of VX to evaluate its effects and to establish a baseline for future experimentation. After approximately 3.5 hours following initial administration of the agent, Sim suddenly became pale and delirious. The experiment was immediately terminated to preserve his life. In their conclusion, the researchers estimated that 2.12 μg/kg of VX delivered intravenously over the course of several hours would be the maximum tolerable dosage and that any more would risk death in a human subject.

=== Use as a weapon ===
In 1988, a United Nations inquiry established that Cuba was responsible for deploying VX against Angolan insurgents during the Angolan Civil War. UN toxicologists obtained trace elements of VX from soil, water, and plant samples taken from areas where Cuban troops had recently carried out counter-insurgency operations. Patients demonstrating symptoms of exposure to nerve agents first began appearing in Angolan hospitals around 1984.

There was evidence of a combination of chemical agents having been used by Iraq against the Kurds in the Halabja chemical attack in 1988 under Saddam Hussein, including VX. Hussein later testified to UNSCOM that Iraq had researched VX but had failed to weaponize the agent due to production failure. After U.S. and allied forces invaded Iraq, no VX agent or production facilities were found. However, UNSCOM laboratories detected traces of VX on warhead remnants.

In December 1994 and January 1995, Masami Tsuchiya of Aum Shinrikyo synthesized 100 to 200 grams (3.5 to 7.1 oz) of VX which was used to attack three people. Two people were injured, and one 28-year-old man died, who was the first victim of VX ever documented in the world at that time. The VX victim, whom Shoko Asahara had suspected as a spy, was attacked at 7:00 am on December 12, 1994, on the street in Osaka by Tomomitsu Niimi and another AUM member, who sprinkled the nerve agent on his neck. He chased them for about 90 metres (100 yd) before collapsing, dying ten days later without ever coming out of a deep coma. Doctors in the hospital suspected at the time he had been poisoned with an organophosphate pesticide, but the cause of death was pinned down only after cult members arrested for the Tokyo subway sarin attack confessed to the killing. Metabolites of VX such as ethyl methylphosphonate, methylphosphonic acid and diisopropyl-2-(methylthio)ethylamine were later found in samples of the victim's blood seven months after his murder. Unlike the cases for sarin gas (the Matsumoto incident and the attack on the Tokyo subway), VX was not used for mass murder.

Confirmed VX attacks executed by Aum Shinrikyo
Date	Agent	Location	Fatalities	Injuries	Comments
Late 1994	VX	Various	0–20	unknown	VX was allegedly used to assassinate up to 20 dissident Aum members.
28 November and 2 December 1994	VX	Tokyo	0	1	Two attempts to murder a man assisting dissident Aum members, man hospitalized for 45 days.
12 December 1994	VX	Osaka	1	0	Posing as joggers, Aum members sprayed Tadahito Hamaguchi, a man who the cult believed was spying on them, with VX from a syringe. He was pronounced dead four days later.
4 January 1995	VX	Tokyo	0	1	Attempted assassination of Hiroyuki Nagaoka, head of the 'Aum Shinrikyo Victim's Group' – Nagaoka was hospitalized for several weeks.
February 1995	VX	Tokyo	0	0	Attempted assassination of Ryuho Okawa, leader of the Institute for Research into Human Happiness, who had criticized the group – Okawa suffered no ill effects.

On February 13, 2017, Kim Jong-nam, half-brother of North Korean leader Kim Jong-un, died after an assault at Kuala Lumpur International Airport in Malaysia. According to the authorities he was murdered by poisoning with VX which was found on his face. The authorities further reported that one of the women suspected of applying the nerve agent experienced some physical symptoms of VX-poisoning. The director of a non-proliferation research program of the Middlebury Institute of International Studies at Monterey stated that VX fumes would have killed the suspected attackers even if they had been wearing gloves, suggesting that the VX was applied as two non-lethal components that would mix to form VX only on the victim's face.

=== Worldwide stockpiles ===
Some countries known to possess VX are the United States (prior to 2022), Russia, North Korea, and Syria. A Sudanese pharmaceutical facility, the Al-Shifa pharmaceutical factory, was bombed by the U.S. in 1998 acting on information that it produced VX and that the origin of the agent was associated with both Iraq and Al Qaeda. The U.S. had obtained soil samples identified as containing O-ethyl hydrogen methylphosphonothioate (EMPTA), a chemical used in the production of VX which may also have commercial applications. Chemical weapons experts later suggested that the widely used fonofos organophosphate insecticide could have been mistaken for EMPTA. Cuba obtained VX during the 1980s and deployed it during its military intervention in Angola.

In 1969, the U.S. government cancelled its chemical weapons programs, banned the production of VX in the United States, and began the destruction of its stockpiles of agents by a variety of methods. Early disposal included the U.S. Army's CHASE (Cut Holes And Sink 'Em) program, in which old ships were filled with chemical weapons stockpiles and then scuttled. CHASE 8 was conducted on June 15, 1967, in which the steamship Cpl. Eric G. Gibson was filled with 7,380 VX rockets and scuttled in 2,200 m (7,200 ft) of water off the coast of Atlantic City, New Jersey. Incineration was used for VX stockpile destruction starting in 1990 with Johnston Atoll Chemical Agent Disposal System in the North Pacific with other incineration plants following at Deseret Chemical Depot, Pine Bluff Arsenal, Umatilla Chemical Depot and Anniston Army Depot with the last of the VX inventory at these facilities destroyed on December 24, 2008. After 2008 the United States' only remaining stockpile of chemical weapons was located at the Blue Grass Army Depot in Kentucky, which housed the last stockpiles of sarin (GB), mustard gas (H) and VX. The Blue Grass stockpile consisted of 101,764 warheads and canisters containing a total of 523 tons of chemical agents loaded onto M55 (rocket), M104 155 mm caliber howitzer and M426 8-inch shell artillery shells. Efforts to destroy these agents began in 2019, with the goal of eliminating the United States entire stockpile of chemical weapons by September 30, 2023. The Centers for Disease Control and Prevention announced in September 2022 that the last of the United States' stockpile of VX gas had been destroyed, confirming that the last VX rocket was dismantled and destroyed on April 19, 2022.

==== Stockpile elimination ====
Worldwide, VX disposal has continued since 1997 under the mandate of the Chemical Weapons Convention. When the convention entered force, the parties declared worldwide stockpiles of 19,586 tonnes (21,590 short tons) of VX. As of December 2015, 98% of the stockpiles had been destroyed.

In fiscal year 2008, the U.S. Department of Defense released a study finding that the United States had dumped at least 112 tonnes (124 short tons) of VX into the Atlantic Ocean off the coasts of New York/New Jersey and Florida between 1969 and 1970. This material consisted of nearly 22,000 M55 rockets, 19 bulk containers holding 640 kg (1,400 lb) each, and one M23 chemical landmine.

The Newport Chemical Depot began VX stockpile elimination using chemical neutralization in 2005. VX was hydrolyzed to much less toxic byproducts by using concentrated caustic solution, and the resulting waste was then shipped off-site for further processing. Technical and political issues regarding this secondary byproduct resulted in delays, but the depot completed their VX stockpile destruction in August 2008.

The remaining VX stockpile in the U.S. was treated by the Blue Grass Chemical Agent-Destruction Pilot Plant in Kentucky, part of the Program Executive Office, Assembled Chemical Weapons Alternatives program. The program was established as an alternative to the incineration process successfully used by the Army Chemical Materials Agency, which completed its stockpile destruction activities in March 2012. The Blue Grass Pilot Plant has been plagued by repeated cost over-runs and schedule slippages since its inception.

In Russia, the U.S. provided support for these destruction activities with the Nunn-Lugar Global Cooperation Initiative. The Initiative has been able to convert a former chemical weapons depot at Shchuchye, Kurgan Oblast into a facility to destroy those chemical weapons. The new facility, which opened in May 2009, has been working on eliminating the nearly 5,400 tonnes (5,950 short tons) of nerve agents held at the former storage complex. However, this facility only held about 14% of Russian chemical weapons, which were stored at seven sites.

The last of the United States remaining stockpile of chemical agents was destroyed on July 7, 2023. The same day, President Biden issued a press statement that it was the final United States' chemical weapon, and all had been eliminated. The United States was the last of the eight countries that signed the Chemical Weapons Convention to destroy its entire stockpile, this was due to adhering to higher safety protocols than other countries, the government wanted to ensure the protection of both the public and the workers above all, which actually put the United States in violation of the treaty as the last of the stockpile was destroyed after the deadline; the United States' stockpile was the last stockpile of chemical weapons in the world. Although the destruction of the stockpiles does not make the world completely free of chemical weapons, there are nations that have used chemical weapons covertly in recent years like Syria deploying chlorine gas during the Syrian civil war, Russia has used chemical agents for assassinations and North Korea's leader Kim Jong Un used a VX-based nerve agent to kill his half brother Kim Jong-nam.

== See also ==
- Dugway sheep incident
- EA-1763
- EA-2192
- List of Rainbow Codes
- Novichok agent
- Binary (novel)
- Poisoning of Alexei Navalny – Attack on Russian politician
