= Han Duk-su =

North Korean activist (1907–2001)

- Portrait of Han Duk-su

Chairman of the Supreme People's Assembly
- In office 1972–1986
- Preceded by: Paek Nam-un

Personal details
- Born: February 18, 1907 Dongho-dong, Naenam-myeon, Gyeongsang County, North Gyeongsang Province, Korean Empire
- Died: February 21, 2001 (aged 94) Tokyo, Japan

- Han Duk-su
- Hangul: 한덕수
- Hanja: 韓德銖
- RR: Han Deoksu
- MR: Han Tŏksu

Han Duk-su (Korean: 한덕수; February 18, 1907 – February 21, 2001) was a North Korean activist who founded the General Association of Korean Residents in Japan (Chongryon) in 1955. His activism started when he moved to Atami in 1933 and advocated for the rights of Zainichi Koreans who were forced to work on the Tanna Tunnel in Japan. However, he was arrested for this a year later, being sentenced to two years in prison.

== Early life ==
Han Duk-su was born on February 18, 1907 in the Korean Empire as the eldest son of Han Gi Man and Jang Nae Gok. After attending Keisung High School for four years, Han left Korea to study in Japan in 1927, wishing to become a vocalist, but was unable to pass the entrance exam for a music school. Two years later, he instead entered the Department of Social Sciences at Nihon University in Tokyo and worked as a newspaper deliveryman before dropping out. Afterwards, he turned his attention to the labor movement, and in 1931, he joined the Tokyo branch of the general trade union under the National Trade Union Council.

== Career ==
=== Imprisonments ===
In August 1933, Han moved to Atami and became a standing member of the Higashizu Labor Union. In September 1934, he was arrested and sentenced to two years in prison with a three-year stay of execution on the charge of having organized a labor dispute among his fellow Korean laborers, who had been under forced labor at the construction site of the Tanna Tunnel. Despite repeated arrests and imprisonments, Han still advocated for Korean rights before the country gained independence from the empire of Japan on August 15, 1945.

=== Formation of Chongryon ===
After September 1945, he served as a representative of a Kantō district association of Koreans and a member of the preparatory committee for Chongryon, which was founded in October 1945 and formed on May 25, 1955. After the end of the Pacific War, he led the formation of the Korean Association in the Kantō region and oversaw the formation of the League of Koreans in Japan (Chōren) in October 1945, serving as chairman of the Kanakawa Prefecture headquarters and central headquarters, and later serving as Director General. He was elected director of the general affairs bureau, and later director of the cultural and educational affairs bureau, of Chongryon, as well as the co-chairman of Chongryon in 1947.

=== Further activism ===
In December 1949, after Chōren was ordered to be disbanded by the Japanese government, Han was appointed as the head of the National Countermeasures Department of the Japanese Communist Party, and in 1951, he opened the Nine Wolseobang (九月書房) to sell publications donated by the propaganda department of North Korea's Workers' Party of Korea and use the proceeds to develop the Korean Zainichi movement.

Additionally, Han served the Fatherland Front Central Committee as its member since 1949, and as a member of its chairmen's group from 1957 until his death in February 2001. He strived to reorganize the Korean compatriots' movement in Japan following Kim Il Sung's Juche-oriented line after 1952, including re-publishment of the magazine Choson Sinbo and resumption of the work of the Korean News Agency based in Tokyo.

In 1952, Han established the Korean Studies Research Institute, using it to promote ideological and cultural struggle by publishing the periodical Joseon Problems Research. In May 1958, at the 4th General Convention of Chongryon, along with the exclusion of the non-mainstream faction, the chairmanship was disbanded and the single chairman/vice chairman system was introduced, and he was elected as chairman. Under this system, a large organizational system was built covering national education, culture, the arts, publishing, reporting, finance, and the economy. Additionally, he was appointed dean of Korea University in 1968, and although there was an uproar around 1970 when Vice-Chairman Kim Pyong-sik openly rebelled against him, he managed to resolve it and held the position of chairman of Chongryon until his death in 2001. He was elected as a central committee member at the founding convention of the Democratic Front for the Reunification of Korea held in Pyongyang in June 1949 and has consistently maintained a pro-North Korean stance ever since. At the second congress in December 1957, he was elected as a member of the standing committee and as one of the seven members of the chairmanship. In 1967, he was elected as a delegate to the 4th Supreme People's Assembly, and in 1972, he succeeded Paek Nam-un as Chairman of the Assembly and served until 1986.

== Later life ==
By the early 1990s, Chongryon employees were paid very modest salaries, barely getting by with their rental payments. Meanwhile, Han and his family were living a life of luxury, occupying a massive mansion in a neighborhood in Tokyo that was staffed with domestic workers, bodyguards, personal assistants, academic tutors for the children, chefs, and chauffeurs. His younger daughters had a limousine transport them between the residence and their school.

== Death ==
On February 21, 2001, Han Duk-su died in Tokyo, Japan from pneumonia. Afterwards, a funeral committee was appointed with So Man-sul as its chairman and Ho Jong-man as vice chairman.
