= Jong Tae-se =

North Korean footballer (born 1984)

Jong Tae-se 정대세 鄭大世 チョン・テセ
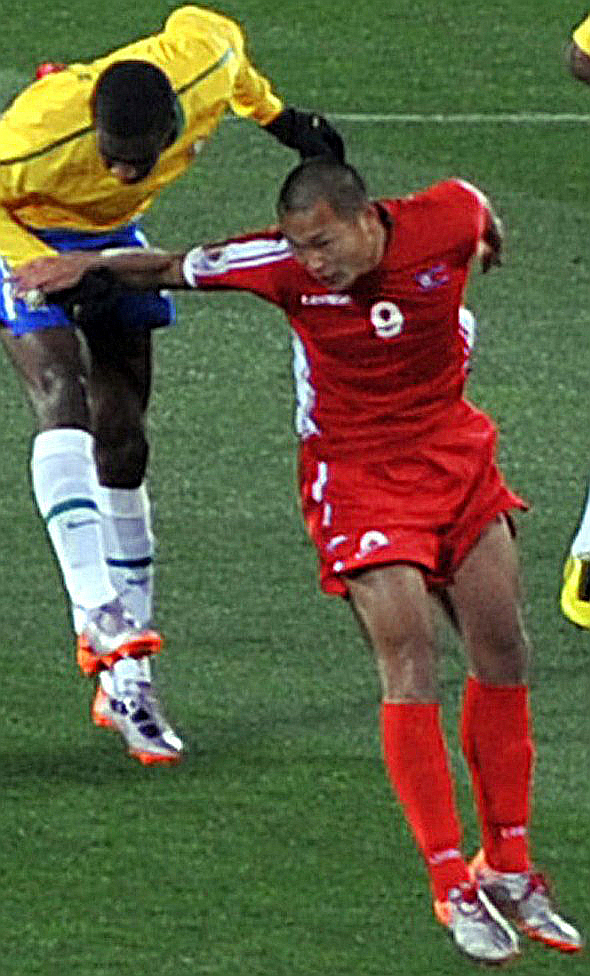
- Jong in action with North Korea against Brazil at the 2010 FIFA World Cup

Personal information
- Full name: Jong Tae-se (South Korea); Jong Tae Se (North Korea); Chong Tese (Japan)
- Date of birth: 2 March 1984 (age 42)
- Place of birth: Nagoya, Aichi, Japan
- Height: 1.81 m (5 ft 11 in)
- Position: Forward

Youth career
- 1997–1999: Toshun Korean Middle School
- 1999–2002: Aichi Korean High School

College career
Years	Team	Apps	(Gls)
2002–2005	Korea University		

Senior career*
Years	Team	Apps	(Gls)
2006–2010	Kawasaki Frontale	112	(46)
2010–2012	VfL Bochum	39	(14)
2012–2013	1. FC Köln	10	(0)
2013–2015	Suwon Bluewings	72	(23)
2015–2020	Shimizu S-Pulse	106	(45)
2020	→ Albirex Niigata (loan)	26	(9)
2021–2022	Machida Zelvia	67	(11)
Total		432	(148)

International career
2007–2011	North Korea	33	(15)
- * Club domestic league appearances and goals

- Jong Tae-se
- Hangul: 정대세
- Hanja: 鄭大世
- RR: Jeong Daese
- MR: Chŏng Taese

Jong Tae-se, also known as Chong Tese (鄭大世; チョン・テセ; Korean: 정대세; born 2 March 1984) is a former professional footballer who played as a forward. Born in Japan, he represented the North Korea national team internationally, notably appearing at the 2010 FIFA World Cup. He is one of few North Koreans who have played in the Japanese J-League and the German 2. Bundesliga.

== Early life and nationality ==
Jong was born in Nagoya, Japan to a father who has South Korean citizenship and a mother who has Joseon citizenship, and became a South Korean national based on the father's family register at the time of birth.

His mother sent him to attend a private school in Japan run by Chongryon, a group closely tied to the North Korean government – where he started football at its elementary school club. He later attended Korea University, a private university in Tokyo also funded by Chongryon. Consequently, Jong has said that he and his family identify themselves as North Koreans. Chongryon, functioning as North Korea's de facto embassy in Japan, issued a North Korean passport to him. This made him eligible, per FIFA and AFC rules, to play for North Korea and resulted in de facto dual nationality.

Jong is fluent in Korean and Japanese. He also knows how to speak Portuguese which he learned from his Brazilian teammates at Japan's Kawasaki Frontale, and German from playing in Germany.

Jong publicly emphasized the separation between sportsmanship and politics after the disputes before and during the match between North Korea and Japan on 15 November 2011.

== Club career ==
After joining Kawasaki Frontale in 2006, the striker quickly rose to become one of Kawasaki's best players and one of the best strikers in the J-League. Jong went for a trial with English club Blackburn Rovers in early 2010. After the 2010 World Cup, Jong joined German club VfL Bochum. After 1 1/2 seasons in the 2. Bundesliga, Jong transferred to 1. FC Köln in the Bundesliga in January 2012, following an injury to German international Lukas Podolski. However, his time at 1. FC Köln was marred by a lack of playing time.

On 3 January 2013, Jong announced that after he would start playing for the first-division South Korean K-League club, Suwon Samsung Bluewings. He had expressed interest in the move for several months before the announcement, while the Bluewings and Ulsan Hyundai FC had also both been negotiating with him. Jong joined the South Korean outfit on 10 January 2013 for a reported fee of €300,000 from 1. FC Köln. After deliberation by K League 1 and FIFA authorities, Jong was registered as a South Korean (domestic) player in the K-League and AFC Champions League competitions.

On 6 April, he scored his debut goal for Suwon in a 3–1 home win against Daegu FC. Two weeks later, 20 April, he scored a hat-trick in a 4–1 win at Daejeon Citizen.

On 8 July 2015, he was bought by Shimizu S-Pulse as an emergency signing as Shimizu were in the drop zone after total points calculation from both stages of the season. He was inserted into the starting lineup on 25 July, Matchday 4 of the 2nd stage, away to his former club Kawasaki Frontale which ended in a 3–2 defeat.

== International career ==
Jong's first international appearance was on 19 June 2007, during a 2008 East Asian Football Championship qualifier match against Mongolia and he scored his first international goal in that game. He went on to score a total of four goals which Korea DPR won the match 7–0. Jong also played at the 2008 East Asian Football Championship and scored two goals in three matches for Korea DPR, receiving top scorer honors along with Park Chu-young, Yeom Ki-hun and Koji Yamase.

Before the FIFA 2010 World Cup Jong was also the key figure in Korea DPR's 2010 FIFA World Cup qualification campaign, as they qualified for the World Cup South Africa for the first time in 44 years. Jong had made himself famous for sobbing uncontrollably when the North Korean national anthem was played before the kickoff of Korea DPR's first group stage match at the 2010 FIFA World Cup in South Africa, against Brazil. In that match he assisted Ji Yun-nam's goal in a 2–1 defeat.

Although nicknamed "the People's Rooney" by the English press, he likened his style of play to Didier Drogba.

== Career statistics ==
=== Club ===
As of 1 January 2021

Appearances and goals by club, season and competition
Club	Season	League			National cup		League cup		Continental		Total	
Club	Season	Division	Apps	Goals	Apps	Goals	Apps	Goals	Apps	Goals	Apps	Goals
Kawasaki Frontale	2006	J1 League	16	1	2	2	4	0	—		22	3
Kawasaki Frontale	2007	J1 League	24	12	4	3	5	2	7	2	40	19
Kawasaki Frontale	2008	J1 League	33	14	2	0	4	1	—		39	15
Kawasaki Frontale	2009	J1 League	29	14	4	3	5	2	9	2	47	21
Kawasaki Frontale	2010	J1 League	10	5	—		—		3	1	13	6
Kawasaki Frontale	Total		112	46	12	8	18	5	19	5	161	64
VfL Bochum	2010–11	2. Bundesliga	25	10	1	0	0	0	—		26	10
VfL Bochum	2011–12	2. Bundesliga	14	4	2	1	0	0	—		16	5
VfL Bochum	Total		39	14	3	1	0	0	0	0	42	15
1. FC Köln	2011–12	Bundesliga	5	0	0	0	0	0	—		5	0
1. FC Köln	2012–13	2. Bundesliga	5	0	1	0	0	0	—		6	0
1. FC Köln	Total		10	0	1	0	0	0	0	0	11	0
Suwon Samsung Bluewings	2013	K League 1	23	10	0	0	—		—		23	10
Suwon Samsung Bluewings	2014	K League 1	28	7	0	0	—		—		28	7
Suwon Samsung Bluewings	2015	K League 1	21	6	0	0	—		—		21	6
Suwon Samsung Bluewings	Total		72	23	0	0	0	0	0	0	72	23
Shimizu S-Pulse	2015	J1 League	13	4	0	0	—		—		13	4
Shimizu S-Pulse	2016	J2 League	37	26	1	1	—		—		38	27
Shimizu S-Pulse	2017	J1 League	23	10	1	0	2	0	—		26	10
Shimizu S-Pulse	2018	J1 League	18	3	2	0	6	3	—		26	6
Shimizu S-Pulse	2019	J1 League	13	2	1	0	5	0	—		19	2
Shimizu S-Pulse	2020	J1 League	2	0	2	0	0	0	—		4	0
Shimizu S-Pulse	Total		106	45	7	1	13	3	0	0	126	49
Albirex Niigata	2020	J2 League	26	9	0	0	—		—		26	9
Machida Zelvia	2021	J2 League	0	0	0	0	—		—		0	0
Career total			365	137	23	10	31	8	19	5	438	160

=== International ===
Appearances and goals by national team and year
National team	Year	Apps	Goals
North Korea	2007	3	8
North Korea	2008	10	3
North Korea	2009	7	1
North Korea	2010	5	3
North Korea	2011	8	0
Total		33	15

Scores and results list North Korea's goal tally first, score column indicates score after each Jong goal.

List of international goals scored by Jong Tae-se
No.	Date	Venue	Opponent	Score	Result	Competition
1	19 June 2007	Macau Stadium, Macau	Mongolia	2–0	7–0	2008 East Asian Football Championship qualification
2	19 June 2007	Macau Stadium, Macau	Mongolia	3–0	7–0	2008 East Asian Football Championship qualification
3	19 June 2007	Macau Stadium, Macau	Mongolia	4–0	7–0	2008 East Asian Football Championship qualification
4	19 June 2007	Macau Stadium, Macau	Mongolia	6–0	7–0	2008 East Asian Football Championship qualification
5	21 June 2007	Macau Stadium, Macau	Macau	2–0	7–1	2008 East Asian Football Championship qualification
6	21 June 2007	Macau Stadium, Macau	Macau	3–0	7–1	2008 East Asian Football Championship qualification
7	21 June 2007	Macau Stadium, Macau	Macau	5–0	7–1	2008 East Asian Football Championship qualification
8	21 June 2007	Macau Stadium, Macau	Macau	6–1	7–1	2008 East Asian Football Championship qualification
9	17 February 2008	Olympic Sports Center, Chongqing	Japan	1–0	1–1	2008 East Asian Football Championship
10	20 February 2008	Olympic Sports Center, Chongqing, China	South Korea	1–1	1–1	2008 East Asian Football Championship
11	15 October 2008	Azadi Stadium, Tehran, Iran	Iran	1–2	1–2	2010 FIFA World Cup qualification
12	27 August 2009	World Games Stadium, Kaohsiung, Taiwan	Chinese Taipei	1–0	2–1	2010 East Asian Football Championship qualification
13	25 May 2010	Cashpoint-Arena, Altach, Austria	Greece	1–1	2–2	Friendly
14	25 May 2010	Cashpoint-Arena, Altach, Austria	Greece	2–2	2–2	Friendly
15	6 June 2010	Makhulong Stadium, Thembisa, South Africa	Nigeria	1–2	1–3	Friendly
