= Japanese North Korean =

Japanese North Korean or North Korean Japanese may refer to:

- Japanese people in North Korea
- North Koreans in Japan
- Japan–North Korea relations
- Japanese language education in North Korea

== See also ==
- Chongryon, the North Korean-funded ethnic representative organisation for Koreans in Japan
- Zainichi Korean language, the dialect of Korean spoken in Japan
