= Chugai Travel =

Korean travel agency in Japan

Chugai Travel Co., Ltd. (中外旅行社, Chugai Ryokousha) is a travel agency based in Taitō, Tokyo, Japan. It is a Zainichi Korean Chongryon-affiliated company that caters international travels and especially international travels to North Korea. Its current CEO is Han Jeong-chi (한정치, 韓正治). It also has package deals for people with Japanese passports to tour North Korea. Although the package deals for groups were discontinued under the guidance of JATA (Japan Association of Travel Agents). Chugai Travel functions as the Japanese branch office of Air Koryo and the Korea International Travel Company.

== Relevancy in Japan ==
There are two main activities in Chugai Travel. First, it is the mainstay travel agency for Koreans living in Japan who have North Korean passports. It also caters its services to the Chousenseki residents (Koreans born and residing in Japan without any nationality affiliation). Second, it is the only travel agency in Japan directly connected to North Korea. It provides its package services to other agencies. Chugai Travel promotes the North Korean official tour brand called Koryo Tour (コリョツアー). So forth, Chugai Travel is the only travel agency mentioned in the Choson Sinbo 's Japanese language travel book, The Beauty of Chosun (朝鮮 魅力の旅).

== Relationship with North Korea ==
- It arranged an investment tour in the Rajin-Sonbong Economic Special Zone in 1996.
- It made a failed attempt to expand a government-orchestrated tour package of the Arirang Festival to American tourists in 1997.

== Air Routes to North Korea ==
Chugai Travel provides tourist packages through China and Russia.

- Through Beijing
  - Japan ~ Beijing (one night stay) ~ Pyongyang (On Air Koryo)
  - Japan ~ Beijing Capital International Airport (transferred at the same day) ~ Pyongyang (On Air Koryo)
- Through Shenyang
  - Kansai International Airport (All Nippon Airways) ~ Shenyang Taoxian International Airport ~ Pyongyang (On Air Koryo)
- Through Vladivostok
  - Niigata Airport ~（Vladivostok International Airport）~ Pyongyang (On Air Koryo)
