= Japan–North Korea Pyongyang Declaration =

2002 agreement between Japan and North Korea

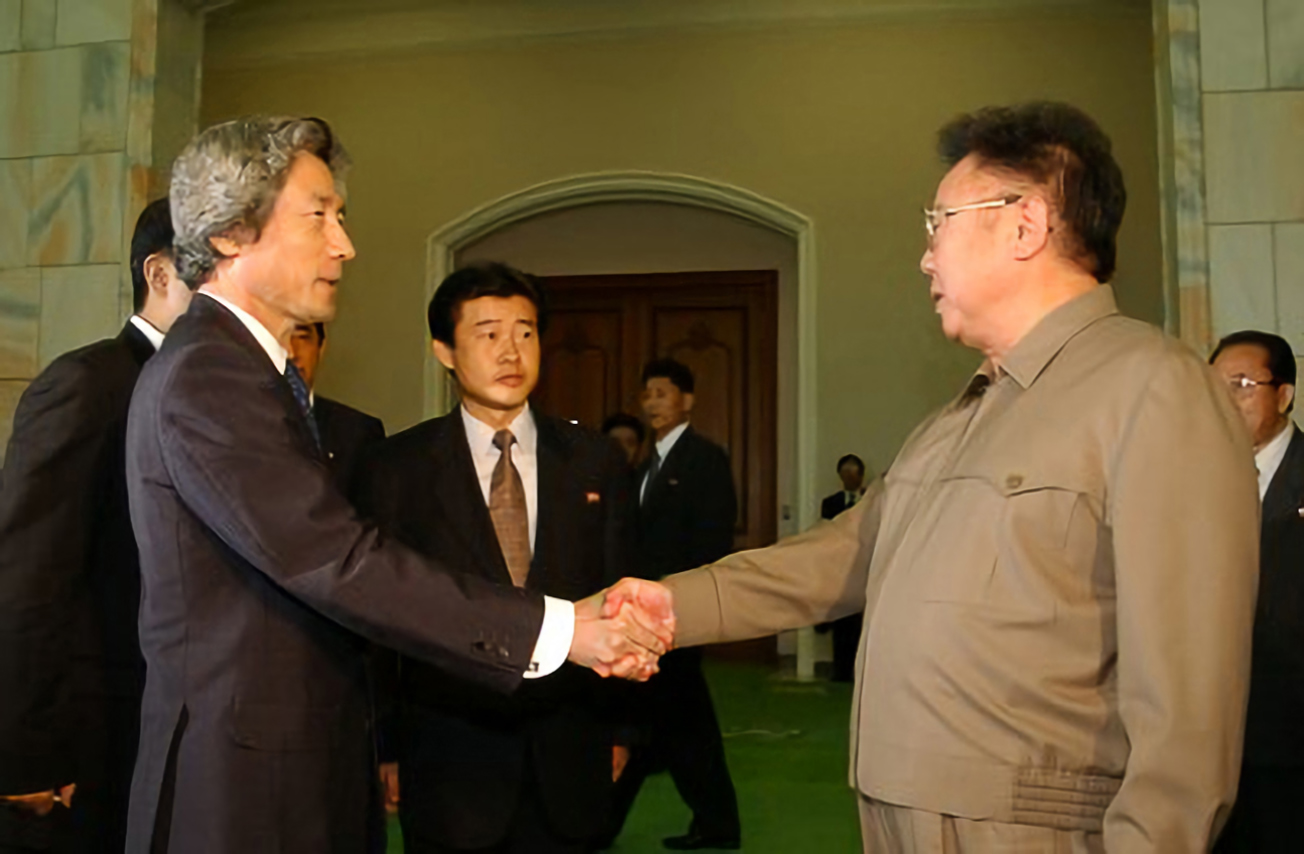
Prime Minister Junichiro Koizumi and Supreme leader Kim Jong-il in Pyongyang, 2002

The Japan–North Korea Pyongyang Declaration (Korean: 조일평양선언, Japanese: 日朝平壌宣言) was signed in 2002, and was the result of a systematic Japan–North Korea summit meeting. The aim of the declaration was to provide low-interest long-term loans to North Korea as well as economic assistance, including humanitarian aid, in accordance with the moratorium of nuclear missile development which has been in place since 1999. The Japanese government hoped to learn the fate of Japanese citizens by North Korea which, prior to the declaration, was unacknowledged.

The declaration resulted in a temporary restraint on nuclear programs from North Korea, the return of five Japanese kidnapping victims who were abducted in the 1970s and 1980s, and the pledge of economic assistance once the abductees were returned.

From 2017, there have been consistent follow-up summits due to breaches that required mediator assistance.

== History of Japan–North Korea Relations ==
The flags of Japan (left) and North Korea (right)

=== 1904–1905 ===
Japan's victory in the Russo-Japanese War led to the 1910 annexation of Korea.

=== 1945 ===
Japan's loss in World War II cost them all their colonial possessions, including Korea. Korea's control by the Allies caused the Korean War (1950–1953).

=== 1991–1992 ===
In 1991 and 1992, there were eight bilateral discussions regarding diplomatic relations between Japan and North Korea. Japan sought a resolution regarding abducted nationals being held in North Korea.

== Pyongyang Declaration ==
=== Economic assistance, loans, and nuclear missile development ===
Japanese Prime Minister Junichiro Koizumi visited North Korea in 2002. Prior to this summit, North Korea had never acknowledged kidnapping Japanese citizens. This visit resulted in a formal apology by Kim Jong-il and the return of known victims. The Japanese government made its first apology to the North Korean government and their predecessors for the turmoil and suffering endured by their citizens from 1910 until 1945.

The Japan–North Korea Pyongyang Declaration included a pledge of economic assistance by Japan for North Korea. This would only be introduced after bilateral diplomatic relations were normalized and abductees returned. Japan believed there were approximately thirteen Japanese citizens abducted by Kim Jong Il's government. Following the agreement, five of these abductees were acknowledged and returned. Through this pledge, North Korea agreed to extend its moratorium on missile testing.

== North Korea missile testing ==
=== 2005 ===
In 2005, Pyongyang announced production of nuclear weapons and Japan responded by voiding its pledge of food aid.

=== 2006 ===
In January 2006, North Korean leader Kim Jong-Il announced the indefinite suspension of all missile testing and nuclear programs. However, in July 2006, North Korea launched long-range missiles, leading to the United Nations and affiliates passing a worldwide resolution ordering the state to dismantle their nuclear program. The United States agreed to suspend its oil delivery alliance. The Japanese government further imposed sanctions including the unilateral ban of North Korean imports and the prohibition of the Man Gyong Bong 92 ferry from Japanese waters. This resulted in several meetings, the six-party talks, involving representatives from North Korea, South Korea, China, Russia, Japan, and the United States.

Following the July launch, in October representatives from North Korea announced their nuclear testing had been successful, leading the United Nations to impose further sanctions including suspension of economic aid from the American government.

=== 2007 ===
Following the six-party talks, the three initial meetings were unsuccessful in negotiations. In February, North Korea shut down its largest nuclear power station in exchange for an aid package from the United Nations valued at over US$400 million.

=== 2009 ===
There was another announcement of a secondary nuclear test by the North Korean government with an approximate earthquake magnitude of 4.5 in Kilju County. Later, American President Barack Obama declared that

North Korea is directly and recklessly challenging the international community.

The sanctions previously set by the United Nations were imposed with further additions following an emergency meeting. North Korea responded by ending the six-party talks.

=== 2012 ===
Diplomatic relations and meetings with incentives with the United States, Russia, Japan and China led to a moratorium by North Korea on all nuclear programming for further aid including food.

=== 2013 ===
North Korea carried out rocket-launch nuclear tests in February 2013, violating UN resolutions.

=== 2017 ===
Following a three-year hiatus, North Korea announced its sixth nuclear test. This led to six-party talks with North Korea's participation.

== Further developments ==
Diplomatic relations between North Korea and Japan are still non existent; sections of the Pyongyang Declaration have been upheld by the two parties. While the declaration referred to Japan and North Korea as "two countries", and described as an "important political document" by Junichiro Koizumi, he stated that Japan does not recognise North Korea even when they signed the declaration. The United States has introduced economic sanctions because of North Korea's ongoing nuclear program. In July 2006, North Korea contentiously fired ballistic missiles.

=== Stockholm Agreement ===
In May 2014, Japan and North Korea instigated the Stockholm Agreement. Kim Jong-un and the North Korean government dedicated a special investigation committee regarding remaining abductees.

Kim Jong-un has expanded missile testing and nuclear programs, stalling the diplomatic measures created under Kim Jong-il.

=== 2019 ===
In 2019, North Korea staged a series of short-range missile testing. This led to a January summit which resulted in Kim Jong-un canceling the Pyongyang Declaration. In March 2019, Japan declined to sign a UN motion condemning North Korea's human rights record. This motion was deemed an olive branch by Japan to North Korea for the sake of establishing an agreement regarding remaining abductees. Japanese Prime Minister Shinzo Abe stated in May 2019:

In order to resolve this abductions issue, we should not miss out any single opportunity and I, myself, have to meet face-to-face with Chairman Kim Jong Un, and meet with him without attaching any conditions. I intend to work to resolve this issue, with the determination that we will not miss out any single opportunity.

== See also ==
- 2006 North Korean missile test
- Japan–North Korea relations
