= Ikeguchi =

Ikeguchi (written: 池口) is a Japanese surname. Notable people with the surname include:

- Ekan Ikeguchi (born 1936), Shingon Buddhist priest
- Shuji Ikeguchi (池口 修次) (born 1949), Japanese politician
- Travis Ikeguchi, the suspect in the Killing of Laura Ann Carleton

== See also ==
- 6910 Ikeguchi, main-belt asteroid
