= Fumihiro Joyu =

Japanese doomsday cult spokesperson

Fumihiro Joyu (上祐 史浩, Jōyū Fumihiro; born 17 December 1962) is a former spokesperson and public relations manager of the Japanese doomsday cult Aum Shinrikyo, and served as the de facto chief of the organization from 1999 to 2007, when he split and formed a new group.

== Background ==
Fumihiro Joyu, originally from Kurume, Fukuoka in Kyūshū, graduated from Waseda University, one of Japan's most prestigious private colleges, with an M.A. degree in artificial intelligence.

== Spokesman for Aum Shinrikyo ==
After the 1995 sarin gas attack on the Tokyo subway, he was summoned to Japan after the arrests of senior followers and he resumed his position as Aum Shinrikyo's spokesperson. He was arrested and tried for "inciting others to make false statements during [1992] court hearings". Some observers linked Joyu's indictment to a supposed government attempt to "decapitate the cult". The arrest, lengthy trial, and subsequent acquittal of Japan's veteran attorney and human rights activist Yoshihiro Yasuda, then head of Shoko Asahara's legal team, a move which was harshly criticized by Human Rights Watch, is often cited in support of this hypothesis.

Joyu would often argue with reporters during press conferences. Especially after the sarin attack, he was sometimes referred to by Japanese as "Aa ieba Joyu", which is a pun on the expression "Aaieba koiu", meaning someone who is excessively contrarian and argumentative (literally "you say one thing and he says the opposite").

He was sentenced to three years in prison and was released in 1999. Later, Joyu apologized for denying Aum's responsibility for the subway attack, saying at that time he had believed that in defending Aum he did the right thing.

== Aleph (1999–2006) ==
Following his release on 29 December 1999, Joyu became the de facto head of the organisation. Under his leadership, Aum Shinrikyo has changed its name to Aleph, the first letter of the Hebrew alphabet. The group has admitted responsibility for the various incidents that involved some of its former senior members, including the Tokyo Subway gas attack, delivered apologies to the victims, and established a special compensations fund. Some of the controversial doctrines that previously attracted criticisms were removed. Most of the time, Joyu resided within Aum's religious facilities with occasional trips to the outside world. Police officials were quoted as advising him to refrain from public activities as they 'could not guarantee his safety'.

== The Circle of Rainbow Light (2007–present) ==
Leadership split into two opposing factions by the end of 2005, according to the Japanese media quoting the Public Security Intelligence Agency (PSIA), which has been monitoring Aleph since 1999. While the fundamentalist faction wishes to keep the organization as close to its pre-1995 ideal, Joyu and his reformer supporters advocate a milder course, aimed at softening social tensions and re-integration into society.

Opposing factions split in late summer 2006, with Joyu and his supporters (among them many former Aum leaders) residing in a separate building in Tokyo and calling themselves Hikari no Wa (The Circle of Rainbow Light). According to Joyu, many of the members have not taken sides yet, and keep staying with the opposing group. It was raided by PSIA agents on 10 May 2007.
