= Hikari no Wa =

New religious movement in Japan started in 2007

The Circle of Rainbow Light
- ひかりの輪
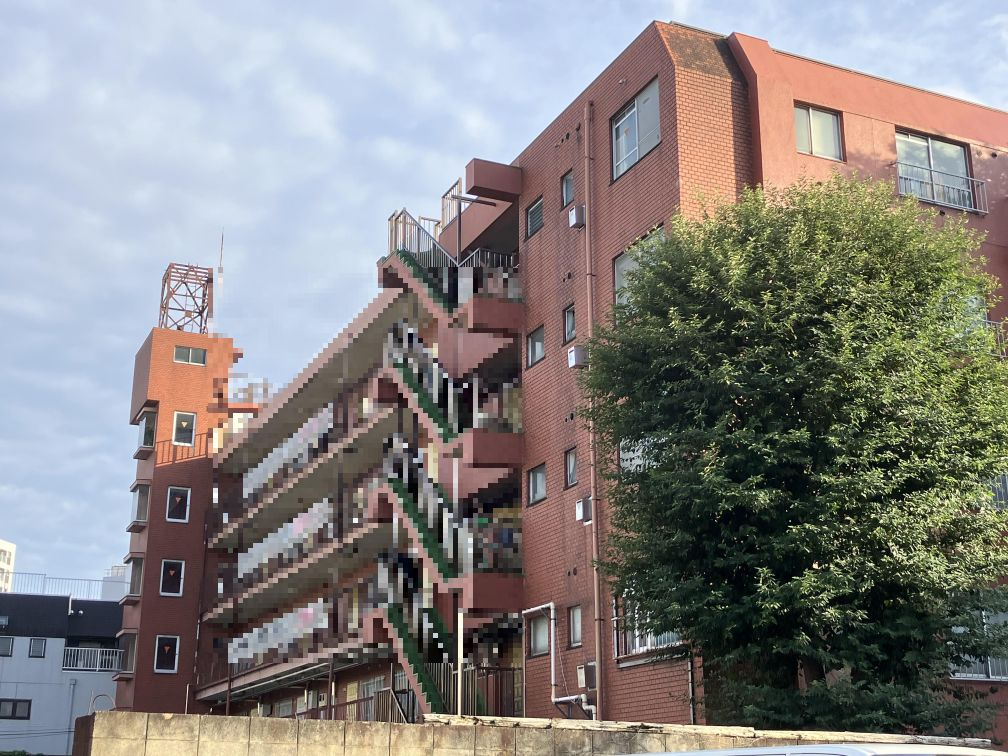
- GS Heim Karasuyama in Minamikarasuyama, where Hikari no Wa headquarters are located in
- Abbreviation: CoL
- Type: Japanese new religious movement
- Classification: Buddhist new religious movement
- Orientation: Dharmic
- Leader: Fumihiro Joyu
- Region: Japan
- Founder: Fumihiro Joyu
- Origin: 2007; Tokyo, Japan
- Separated from: Aleph (2007)
- Members: 106
- Other name: Circle of Light

Hikari no Wa or The Circle of Rainbow Light (Japanese: ひかりの輪, lit. "Circle of Light") is a Japanese new religious movement started in 2007. It was founded by Fumihiro Joyu (上祐史浩, Jōyū Fumihiro), the previous spokesperson and public relations manager of the Japanese Buddhist new religious group and doomsday cult Aum Shinrikyo. Hikari no Wa's stated goal is not to influence a particular faith, but instead to help people find a new way to think about religion in their daily lives.

== Symbol ==
The group is symbolized by the sun surrounded by a gold wheel with a rainbow circle in the design. The wheel symbolizes that Hikari no Wa is equal to other religions and the light in the design is a symbol of wisdom and spirituality.

== History ==
Many of the remaining followers of Aum Shinrikyo founder and convicted terrorist Shoko Asahara formed Aleph five years after the Tokyo subway sarin attack in 1995.

Hikari no Wa split from Aleph in 2007 and publicized the intention of "completely discarding the influence of Aum founder Shoko Asahara."

At its foundation, the group had 57 live-in followers and nine other executives with 106 lay members.

The group is said to organize gatherings and pilgrimages, visiting places deemed holy by different religions and distributing sermons on various aspects of Buddhism. The group's leader Joyu positions himself as an authority in the field of spirituality, who gained 'spiritual experience' which he is sharing with members of the group.

== Government surveillance status ==
The Japanese Public Security Intelligence Agency said the group would remain subject to surveillance under the law. Japan's Public Security Examination Commission considers Aleph and Hikari no Wa to be branches of a "dangerous religion" and announced in January 2015 that they would remain under surveillance for three more years.

The Japanese government ended surveillance of Hikari no Wa in 2017 due to a legal challenge, but continued to keep Aleph under watch. On February 28, 2019, the Tokyo High Court ruled that another extension of the group's surveillance would be allowed, reversing the earlier decision that caused monitoring to be discontinued in 2017. The court's decision was based on the fact that Hikari no Wa has members who were involved in Aum Shinrikyo and there is no evidence of a major change between the former group and the current group.
