= So Man-sul =

Zainichi Korean politician (1927–2012)

- Born: 17 April 1927; Gyeongju, Korea, Empire of Japan
- Died: 19 February 2012 (aged 84); Tokyo, Japan
- Known for: Chairman of Chongryon; Member of the Supreme People's Assembly of North Korea

Korean name
- Hangul: 서만술
- Hanja: 徐萬述
- RR: Seo Mansul
- MR: Sŏ Mansul

So Man-sul (Korean: 서만술; 17 April 1927 – 19 February 2012) was the chairman of the Central Standing Committee of the pro-Pyongyang General Association of Korean Residents in Japan (Chongryon), as well as a member of the Supreme People's Assembly of North Korea.

In May 2006, he met his counterpart of the pro-Seoul association Mindan, Ha Byung-ok. According to a joint statement signed on 17 May 2006, "Chongryon and Mindan affirmed each other that they would surely convert the long-standing antagonism and confrontation between the two organizations into reconciliation and concord in conformity with the trend of national history advancing toward national unity and reunification in the idea of 'By our nation itself', the main spirit of the 15 June joint declaration".

However, Mindan's regional chapters strongly opposed the statement, and Ha Byung-ok was expelled from Mindan for attempting reconciliation with Chongryon. The new Mindan leadership criticises the declaration as a North Korean scheme to use Mindan for its reunification purposes, and in November 2006 published an article citing its reasoning behind opposing the joint statement, which it called "against humanity and human rights". Pro-Chongryon media blamed this on "pressure from the Japanese government",

On 30 October 2006, he met in Tokyo with Paek Rak-chong, chairman of the South Side's Committee for Implementing the 15 June Joint Declaration (see Reunification of Korea).

In April 2007, Tokyo Metropolitan Police Department requested So and two other Chongryon officials to voluntarily attend the police station to give statements in connection with a 1970s abduction of a Japanese toddler by North Korean agents. Chongryon issued a public statement rejecting the request.

== Death ==
On 19 February 2012, he died of heart failure at his home in Tokyo's Edogawa ward, at the apparent age of 84. A funeral service was held in Tokyo's Korean Hall in the presence of funeral committee chairman Ho Jong-man and others.

== Sources ==
- Il Park (2010). Zainichi Korean Dictionary. Akashi Shoten. ISBN 978-4-7503-3300-7.
