= Shigetake Ogata =

Japanese lawyer (born 1934)

Shigetake Ogata (緒方重威, Ogata Shigetake, born 1934) is a former Japanese lawyer who served as head of the Public Security Intelligence Agency from 1993 to 1997.

He is a graduate of the law faculty of Waseda University and passed the Japanese bar exam at the age of 23. Before his time at PSIA, he was an accomplished prosecutor and headed the Sendai and Hiroshima high public prosecutor's offices.

Ogata was arrested and convicted of fraud in 2007 in connection with the sale of the headquarters of Chongryon, the de facto North Korean embassy in Japan. Ogata was found to have conspired with co-defendant Tadao Mitsui to have Chongryon transfer ownership of its building to a company managed by Ogata on the pretext of having found a buyer for the property. Ogata's conviction was upheld by the Supreme Court of Japan in 2014, although he received a suspended prison sentence and was never actually imprisoned. Ogata claimed that the purchase was intended to keep the building from being seized by creditors due to the threat of reprisal from North Korea.

== Publications ==
- 公安検察 私はなぜ、朝鮮総連ビル詐欺事件に関与したのか. Kodansha. 1 August 2009. ISBN 978-4062156127.
