= Public Security Intelligence Agency =

Japanese intelligence agency

- 公安調査庁; Kōanchōsa-chō

Agency overview
- Formed: July 21, 1952; 74 years ago
- Preceding agencies: Investigation Bureau (IB), Home Ministry (1946); Internal Affairs Bureau (IAB), 2nd Office (1948); Special Investigation Board (SIB), Attorney General's Office (1948-1949)
- Jurisdiction: Government of Japan
- Headquarters: Chiyoda, Tokyo, Japan
- Employees: +/- 1,830 officers (As of 2025)
- Annual budget: 16,672,037,000 Yen (As of 2024)
- Minister responsible: Minister of Justice
- Agency executive: Masaki Wada, Director-General
- Parent agency: Ministry of Justice
- Website: Official Site (in Japanese)

The Public Security Intelligence Agency (公安調査庁, Kōanchōsa-chō) is a Japanese intelligence agency under the Ministry of Justice, which collects and analyzes information from domestic and international sources on threats to national security and works to eliminate those threats based on the Subversive Activities Prevention Act and the Act Regarding the Control of Organizations Which Committed Indiscriminate Mass Murder.

Any investigation conducted by the agency needs to go through the Public Security Examination Commission (PSEC) in order to determine if there is a justification to investigate and clamp down on an organization's activities.

The PSIA's findings are released publicly through the annually-published Naigai Jousei no Kaiko to Tenbo (Situation in Public Security Inside and Outside Japan and Their Prospect) as well as regularly-published Kokusai Terrorism Youran (International Terrorism Report).

Since 2015, the PSIA has been eyed as the basis for the creation of a new foreign intelligence agency.

== History ==
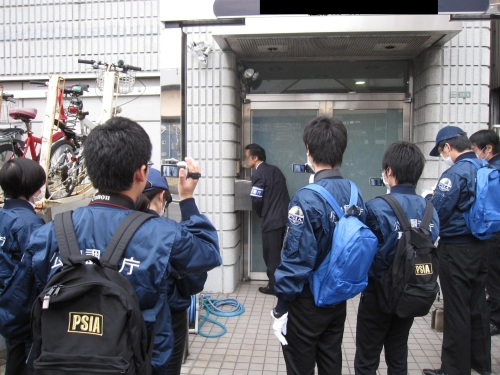
PSIA officers inspect a suspected Aum Shinrikyo building in 2012.

The Public Security Intelligence Agency was established with the enforcement of the Subversive Activities Prevention Law on July 21, 1952. The PSIA took over the role of the Special Investigation Board (SIB), which was established by the Allied Forces during the occupation. Most of the recruits came from the disbanded Tokumu Kikan (機関) and led by officials from the pre-occupation Ministry of Justice.

Initially focusing on threats from far left groups such as the Japanese Red Army (JRA) during the days of the Cold War, it began to conduct intelligence work on the Aum Shinrikyo after the Sarin gas attack on the Tokyo subway in 1995, with criticism that the PSIA did not monitor the group, especially with their attempt to acquire and stockpile biological weapons on Japanese soil. The PSIA had cooperated with the Tokyo Metropolitan Police Department Public Security Bureau in investigating Aum Shinrikyo for a number of years. When asked about their investigation on the cult, a PSIA report had said "There has been no change in its dangerous nature. Strict surveillance is essential."

The PSIA had investigated Aum Shinrikyo when it was revealed that the group had established software firms that could pose security risks to Japan.

Chongryon has been under PSIA surveillance for a long time, suspecting it of supposedly performing espionage activities in Japanese soil. The Japanese Ministry of Justice has sought ¥270 million to fund the PSIA on conducting intelligence against North Korea espionage activities. Its facilities were also raided by the PSIA while sentencing for its leaders were underway in 2004.

The PSIA had been supposed to be integrated with Cabinet Intelligence and Research Office (CIRO) in order to reorient the agency to a post–Cold War and to enhance its resources in the 1990s, but the proposal was not adopted.

An investigation into French Al-Qaeda terrorist Lionel Dumont had been the responsibility of the PSIA in 2004 based on rumors that he was supposed to establish a Japanese Al-Qaeda cell. The PSIA raided the headquarters of Fumihiro Joyu's Hikari no Wa on May 10, 2007. Despite insistence from Joyu that his group had ended ties with Aum Shinrikyo, PSIA officials have warned that his group has ties to Shoko Asahara after conducting raids.

In the wake of Kim Jong-il's death in 2011, the PSIA reported that they are undertaking intelligence work on North Korea by conducting intelligence work towards Chongryon, as they had remitted money and gifts to North Korea before sanctions were imposed.

In 2015, the PSIA offered university students a one-day immersion to work alongside veteran PSIA officers.

On July 14, 2016, the PSIA sent officers to Sapporo to investigate Aleph's Shiroshi Ward facility under the Act on the Control of Organizations Which Have Committed Acts of Indiscriminate Mass Murder.

In January 2017, Okinawa press reported that the PSIA has conducted investigation into pro-Okinawan independence and anti-United States Forces Japan (USJF) bases activist groups for potential links to China.

In December 2019, an anti-Aum Shinrikyo video was created by the agency in order to raise public awareness that the group is still a threat to public safety.

On April 9, 2023, the PSIA launched a division dedicated to economic security and protect sensitive technology from being taken out of Japanese soil. Investigation offices for economic security and cybersecurity under its second investigation department were established in April 2022.

On April 21, 2023, Hideji Suzuki, the former director of a Japan-China youth exchange association, suggested that the PSIA has a pro-Chinese mole that was behind his arrest in China for allegations of spying. MSS agents showed him photos that were likely taken from PSIA IDs.

=== Operations ===
While the PSIA is known to conduct its operations on domestic soil, there are suggestions that they have conducted limited clandestine and covert operations overseas.

In the 2000s, the PSIA was reported to have conducted undercover operations at the Chinese-North Korean border by distributing flyers to locals in obtaining information regarding Japanese nationals abducted by North Korea.

In 2003, it was reported that the PSIA had a mole inside Aum Shinrikyo by the name of Kazumi Kitagawa, who joined the cult after the sarin gas attack in the Tokyo Metro; she later tried to seek asylum in North Korea. She revealed to Aum about her work in the PSIA and her plans to cut ties with them after she accused a PSIA officer of raping her.

From 2005 to 2016, reports of Japanese nationals being arrested throughout China for taking photos of sensitive installations or conducting illegal activities undercover of legal occupations suggests that the PSIA has recruited expats working/living in China to conduct limited HUMINT operations. These allegations have never been officially confirmed.

According to a National Police Agency official, the PSIA has done a bad job in China if reports do prove that the expats arrested were covertly recruited by the agency.

== Organization ==
The PSIA is formed with the current organization:

- Internal Departments
  - General Affairs Department
    - Trial Office
    - Planning and Coordination Office
    - Information Management Office
    - Public Relations and Communications Office
    - Human Resources Section
    - Work Promotion Office
  - First Intelligence Department (domestic intelligence, headed by career police officer)
    - Section 1 (domestic security issues - Citizen group/s investigation, electoral information)
    - Section 2 (Kakurōkyō/Revolutionary Communist League, National Committee investigation)
    - Third Division (Japanese Communist Party investigation)
    - Fourth Division (right wing group/s investigation)
    - Fifth Division (other domestic pro-left group/s investigations such as Japan Revolutionary Communist League (Revolutionary Marxist Faction))
    - Aum Special Research Office
  - Second Intelligence Department (foreign intelligence, headed by career/non-career person)
    - Section 1 (Japanese Red Army and international terrorism investigation)
    - Section 2 (foreign intelligence investigation, including liaising with foreign agents stationed in Japan)
    - Third Division (North Korean investigation)
    - Fourth Division (China/Southeast Asia/Russia/Europe/United States investigation)
- Institute
  - Training Institute (located in Akishima)
- Regional Bureaus
  - Hokkaido (Hokkaido Bureau), Miyagi (Tohoku Bureau), Tokyo (Kanto Bureau), Aichi (Chubu Bureau), Osaka (Kinki Bureau), Hiroshima (Chugoku Bureau), Kagawa (Shikoku Bureau) and Fukuoka (Kyushu Bureau)
    - Public Security Intelligence Offices (Hokkaido, Iwate, Niigata, Saitama, Chiba, Kanagawa, Shizuoka, Nagano, Ishikawa, Kyoto, Hyogo, Okayama, Kumamoto and Okinawa.)

=== Foreign ties ===
The PSIA has ties to several foreign intelligence security agencies, including the CIA, FBI, MI6, Mossad, and Research and Analysis Wing (RAW), with several PSIA agents being invited to train with the CIA under its Intelligence Analysis Course.

In October 2018, Chen Wenqiang, head of the Chinese Ministry of State Security, visited the PSIA in order to collaborate on counterterrorism activities prior to the 2020 Tokyo Olympics.

== Known Director-Generals of the PSIA ==
- Shigetake Ogata – 1993 to 1997, head of Harvest investment group
- Toshiro Yanagi – 2006 to 2009

== Criticism ==
The PSIA has faced criticism in the past for being ineffective, in part because it has little ability to act without approval from the PSEC, an ad hoc body that meets only when required. According to Philip H.J. Davies and Kristian Gustafson, the PSIA operates similarly to the British Security Service (MI5) since officers have no rights to arrest anyone during a law enforcement operation nor force anyone to be involved in an investigation.

The criticism was especially made after public discovery that the agency did not move against Aum Shinrikyo. Due to the strict legal framework surrounding the agency it had not been given permission to monitor the organization directly until 2000, despite having requested permission from the PSEC in 1996.

== Bibliography ==
- Davies, Philip H.J.; Gustafson, Kristian, eds. (2013). Intelligence Elsewhere: Spies and Espionage Outside the Anglosphere. Georgetown University Press. ISBN 978-1589019560.
- Dover, Robert; Goodman, Michael S.; Hillebrand, Claudia, eds. (2014). Routledge Companion to Intelligence Studies. New York: Routledge. ISBN 978-1589019560.
- Samuels, Richard J. (2019). Special Duty: A History of the Japanese Intelligence Community. Cornell University Press. ISBN 978-1501741586.
- Wildes, Harry Emerson (1953). "The Postwar Japanese Police". The Journal of Criminal Law, Criminology, and Police Science. 43 (5): 655–671. doi:10.2307/1139663. JSTOR 1139663.
- Williams, Brad (2021). Japanese Foreign Intelligence and Grand Strategy: From the Cold War to the Abe Era. Georgetown University Press. ISBN 978-1647120634.
