= Ho Jong-man =

North Korean politician (born 1935)

Personal details
- Born: 22 February 1935 (age 91) Goseong County, Keishōnan Province, Korea, Empire of Japan

Korean name
- Hangul: 허종만
- Hanja: 許宗萬
- RR: Heo Jongman
- MR: Hŏ Chongman

Ho Jong-man (Korean: 허종만; born 22 February 1935 in Goseong County) is a North Korean politician who served as the third chairman of Chongryon, an association of North Korean residents in Japan. Formerly vice-chairman of the association since July 1993, he succeeded So Man-sul in May 2012 after his death. He is also a deputy of the Supreme People's Assembly.

In Japan, with which there are no diplomatic relations, he is the de facto ambassador from North Korea.

== Biography ==
Ho Jong-man was born on 22 February 1935 in South Gyeongsang Province, located in Goseong County (now in South Korea) during the Japanese occupation of Korea, and later moved to Japan with his family. In 1955, he was involved in the formation of the General Association of Korean Residents in Japan, also known as Chongryon, and served as chairman of the Kanagawa Prefecture headquarters. In 1959, he was elected chairman of Chongryon. He then served as director of the International Affairs Bureau of the Central Headquarters, and in September 1986, he became the deputy chairman of the Central Committee of the General Assembly. During that time, he worked at Chogin Credit Union, where he had control over personnel affairs. In July 1993, he was promoted to the position of deputy speaker, officially assuming real power. In Japan, with which there are no diplomatic relations, he is the de facto ambassador from North Korea.

On May 19, 2012, following So Man-sul's death in February of the same year, Ho took over as the third chairman of the General Federation of Korea. He later became a deputy member through the 2019 North Korean parliamentary election. He was elected in the 11th election of the Supreme People's Assembly of North Korea in August 2003, and re-elected in the 12th election of the Supreme People's Assembly in March 2009. In March 2014, he was re-elected in the 13th election of the Supreme People's Assembly, and in May, he was re-elected as chairman of the General Association of Korean Residents in Japan.

On 26 March 2015, his home was searched along with that of Vice Chairman Nam Seung-woo, as he was an associate of the president of a trading company who was arrested for illegally importing North Korean matsutake, which were subject to economic sanctions. On April 9, the Supreme People's Assembly was held in North Korea, but Nam attended from the General Association of Korean Residents in Japan.

In the 2019 North Korean parliamentary election, Ho was re-elected from the Gokdong constituency (Myonggan County, North Hamgyong Province).

== Awards and honors ==
In February 2013, Ho won the Hero of Labor, the Golden Shield Medal and the First Class National Flag Medal. In the 14 February 2020 edition of the Rodong Sinmun, it was announced that the Order of the National Flag 1st Class and the title of Hero of Labor had been awarded to the three generations of leaders for "greatly contributing to the achievement of the Juche revolution and the patriotic achievements of the General Association of Korean Residents in Japan with absolute loyalty."
