= General Association of Koreans in China =

Korean diaspora organization in China

- Type: NGO
- Region served: China
- Official language: Korean
- Chairwoman: Choe Un-bok
- Main organ: Congress

General Association of Koreans in China

Chinese name
- Traditional Chinese: 旅華朝鮮人總聯合會
- Simplified Chinese: 旅华朝鲜人总联合会
Transcriptions
Standard Mandarin
- Hanyu Pinyin: Lǚ-Huá cháoxiǎnrén zǒngliánhéhuì
- Wade–Giles: Lu-Hua Ch'ao-hsien-ren Tsung-lian he-hui

Japanese name
- Kanji: 在中朝鮮人総聯合会
Transcriptions
- Revised Hepburn: Zai-Chu Chōsenjin Sōrengōkai

North Korean name
- Chosŏn'gŭl: 재중조선인총연합회

The General Association of Koreans in China is a pro-DPRK group of ethnic Koreans in the People's Republic of China. The organization is led by Chairwoman Choe Un-bok and held its sixth congress in Shenyang, China, on August 10, 2016. At that time it had been seven years since their fifth congress.

There are regional and branch organizations of the GAKC, including one in the Yanbian Korean Autonomous Prefecture. The regional chairman there, Cha Sang-bo, is the vice-chairman of the General Association of Koreans in China.

They publish a magazine called Paektu-Halla.

The organization was apparently founded in 1991, based around a "Korean-Japanese headquarters" led by Chung Min Lee. It adopted its current name in 1998.

== See also ==
- Chongryon (General Association of Korean Residents in Japan)
