= Ekan Ikeguchi =

Ekan Ikeguchi (池口恵観; born November 15, 1936) is a Japanese Shingon Buddhist priest, currently the High Priest of Saifukuji in Kagoshima and Shojoshin-in on Mount Koya. He holds a doctorate in medicine from Yamaguchi University and is an expert in the goma fire ritual. He has spoken at Harvard University and performed a ritual at the World Trade Center site in October 2001.

In 1961 he was arrested for attempting a coup d'etat on the Japanese government.

Since becoming abbot of Saifukuji he installed a shrine to North Korean leader Kim Il Sung. He frequently travels to North Korea, explaining that it is his way of apologizing for the brutality of Korea under Japanese rule. On the death of Kim Jong Il, he said, "I am overcome with sadness to hear of the passing of His Majesty Great Leader Kim Jong Il."

In March 2013, he attempted to purchase the bankrupt headquarters of Chongryon for $48 million. He explained that the North Koreans asked him to maintain the building for Chongryon. He was unable to secure funds for the purchase, and in November 2014 Marunaka Holdings Co. purchased the property for ¥2.21 billion. Marunaka Holdings reportedly plans to ask Chongryon to vacate the property, despite protests from Pyongyang.
