= Chōsen-seki =

Legal status for Koreans in Japan

Japanese name
- Kanji: 朝鮮籍
- Hiragana: ちょうせんせき
Transcriptions
- Romanization: Chōsen-seki

Korean name
- Hangul: 조선적
- Hanja: 朝鮮籍
Transcriptions
- Revised Romanization: Joseonjeok
- McCune–Reischauer: Chosŏnjŏk

Chōsen-seki (朝鮮籍; lit. 'Korean (Joseon) domicile') is a legal status assigned by the Japanese government to ethnic Koreans in Japan who do not have Japanese nationality and who have not registered as South Korean nationals. The status arose following the end of World War II, when many Koreans lost Japanese nationality. Most people with this status technically have both North Korean nationality and South Korean nationality under those countries' respective nationality laws, but since they do not have South Korean documents, and Japan does not recognize North Korea as a state, they are treated in some respects as being stateless.

As of 2025 there were around 22,200 people with this status, compared to over 407,000 registered South Korean nationals in Japan.

== Background ==
Chōsen-seki is a convention made by the Japanese government to register Korean residents in Japan shortly after the Surrender of Japan as if they had been stateless. The Korean people originally had Japanese citizenship during the Japanese occupation of the Korean Peninsula. However, their Japanese citizenship was later revoked by Japanese government after Japan surrendered and gave up sovereignty over Korea, first practically in 1947 under Edict of Foreigner Registration (ja) of Allied Occupied Japan, then finally and formally, in 1952 through the San Francisco Treaty.

In 1947, Koreans were still technically of Japanese citizenship although Article 11 of the Edict of Foreigner Registration states that they are considered foreigners. Hence, the Koreans who then resided in Japan were registered as "of Chōsen" according to their geographical origin as substitution of nationality. Since the foundation of South Korea in 1948, those Koreans have been able to reprocess their foreigner registration in Japan as South Korean nationals willingly. Those who did not do so, either because of an affinity for North Korea or because they did not wish to choose a side, retained Chōsen-seki status.

== Legal treatment ==
=== In Japan ===
Japan delegates various issues of private civil law (such as family law) involving foreigners to the foreigners' home country. For example, Zainichi registered as South Korean have their wills determined by South Korean law. With regard to Chōsen-seki individuals, Japanese courts have generally applied South Korean law, but in some cases have applied North Korean law or Japanese law (in the latter case, treating the individual as stateless).

Some Chōsen-seki individuals report discrimination based on their status, as it is associated with North Korea.

=== In South Korea ===
Chōsen-seki individuals cannot obtain a South Korean passport unless they register as South Korean nationals. Historically, they could travel to South Korea with a special travel document issued in Japan, but this practice was curtailed in 2009 under the Lee Myung-bak government. The Moon Jae-in government relaxed travel restrictions for Chōsen-seki individuals in 2017, with Moon stating that "we will normalize visits to their homeland regardless of nationality as a humanitarian gesture."

On September 30, 2010, the Seoul High Court declared that an ethnic Korean from Japan with Chōsen-seki status was a "stateless overseas compatriot" and could be refused a travel document; on appeal in 2013, the Supreme Court did not use the term "stateless" but suggested that the individual was not a South Korean national.

=== In North Korea ===
North Korea has issued nationality certificates and North Korean passports to Chōsen-seki individuals for both visiting and repatriation purposes.

== See also ==
- Chongryon
- Mindan
- Koreans in Japan
- Japan–North Korea relations
- Koryo-Saram
- Certificate of Citizenship (Indonesia)
