= Choson Sinbo =

North Korea–aligned newspaper in Japan

Chosun Shinbo
- Type: Weekly newspaper
- Publisher: General Association of Korean Residents
- Launched: 1 June 1957
- Language: Korean and Japanese
- Country: Japan
- Website: chosonsinbo.com

Choson Sinbo

Japanese name
- Kanji: 朝鮮新報
- Kana: ちょうせんしんぽう
Transcriptions
- Revised Hepburn: Chōsen Shinpō

North Korean name
- Chosŏn'gŭl: 조선신보
- Hancha: 朝鮮新報
Transcriptions
- Revised Romanization: Joseon Sinbo
- McCune–Reischauer: Chosŏn Sinbo

The Choson Sinbo (朝鮮新報; Korean: 조선신보; or Chosun Shinbo), also known by the name of its English edition The People's Korea, is a North Korea-aligned newspaper based in Japan, published in both Korean and Japanese. The name literally means 'Korea Newspaper'. It is published by the General Association of Korean Residents, a pro-North Korea representative body for Zainichi Koreans, who also run The People's Korea (PK), an English language news site.

When reporting from North Korea, Choson Sinbo journalists enjoy more freedoms than other foreign reporters. They have managed to publish exclusive stories on projects in the country and scoops on Japan–North Korea relations.

== History ==
On November 4, 2020, NK News reported that the majority of Choson Sinbo's content was placed behind a paywall, which could result in legal troubles due to sanctions against North Korea.

== Notable staff ==
- Lee Hoesung wrote for the paper until 1969

== See also ==
- Rimjingang
