= Man Gyong Bong 92 =

1992–2013 North Korean ferry

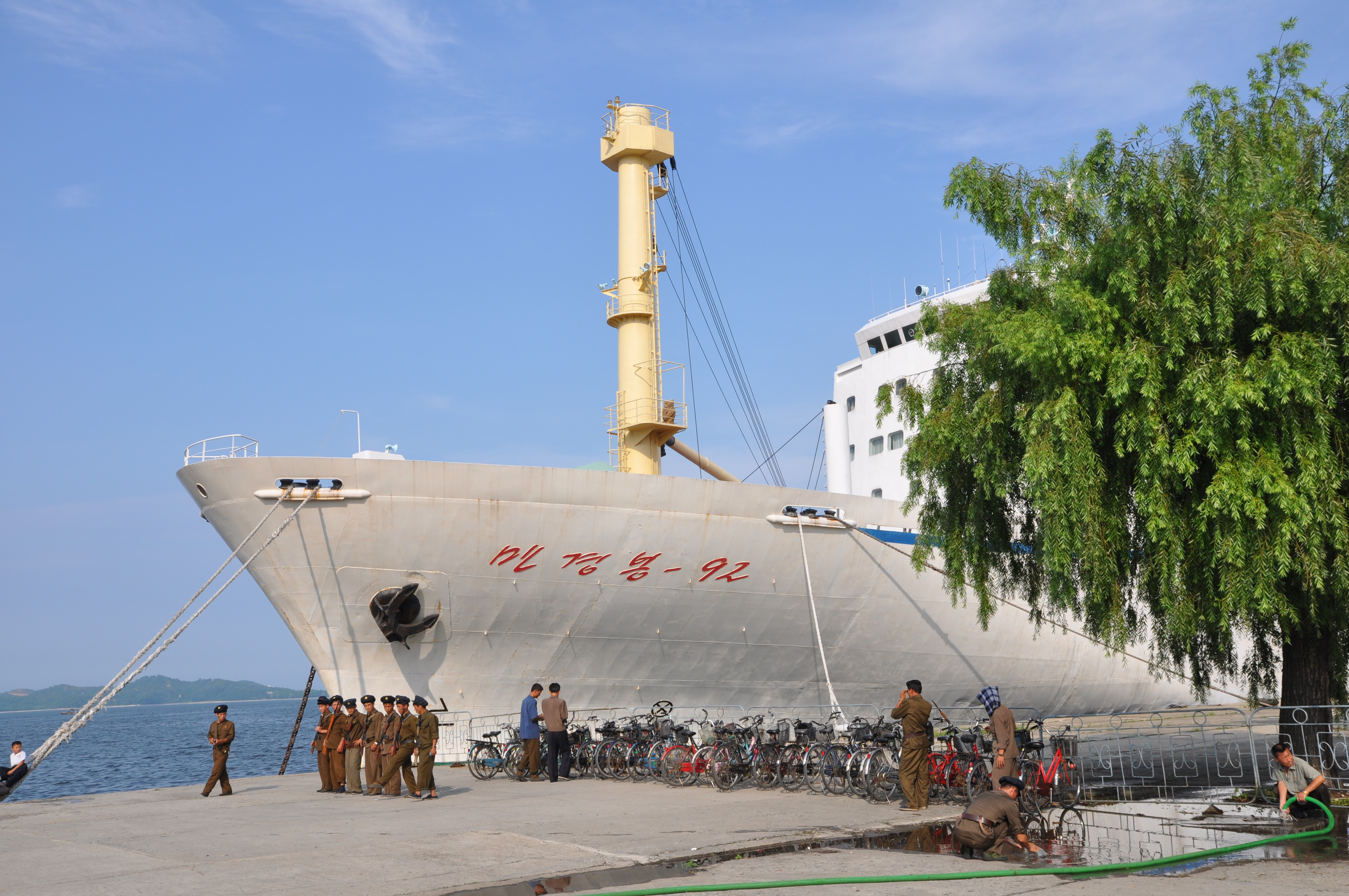
- Man Gyong Bong 92 at Wonsan in 2010

History
- Name: Man Gyong Bong 92
- Owner: Daizin Shipping Co.
- Port of registry: Wonsan, North Korea
- Route: Wonsan-Niigata (until 2006), Rason-Mount Kumgang (2011)
- Builder: Chongjin Shipyard
- Launched: 1992
- Out of service: 2013
- Identification: Call sign: HMZL; IMO number: 8890580; MMSI number: 445101000
- Status: Laid-up, anchored in Wonsan

General characteristics
- Type: Ro-Ro/passenger ship
- Tonnage: 9,672 GT; 2,014 DWT
- Length: 126.1 m (413 ft 9 in)
- Beam: 20.5 m (67 ft 3 in)
- Speed: 23 knots (43 km/h; 26 mph)
- Capacity: 350 passengers and 1,000 tons of cargo

Korean name
- Hangul: 만경봉 92호
- Hanja: 萬景峰 92號
- RR: Mangyeongbong 92ho
- MR: Man'gyŏngbong 92ho

Man Gyong Bong 92 is a cargo-passenger ferry, named after a hill near Pyongyang. The ferry was built in 1992 with funds from Chongryon, the pro-North Korean General Association of Korean Residents in Japan, and was used to transport passengers and cargo between North Korea and Japan. These voyages continued until 2006 when Japan banned North Korean ships from its waters. In 2011 the ship trialed a route between Rason and Mount Kumgang. In 2018, the ship carried a 140 person delegation, as well as an art troupe, for the 2018 Winter Olympics and docked in Mukho port.

== Background ==
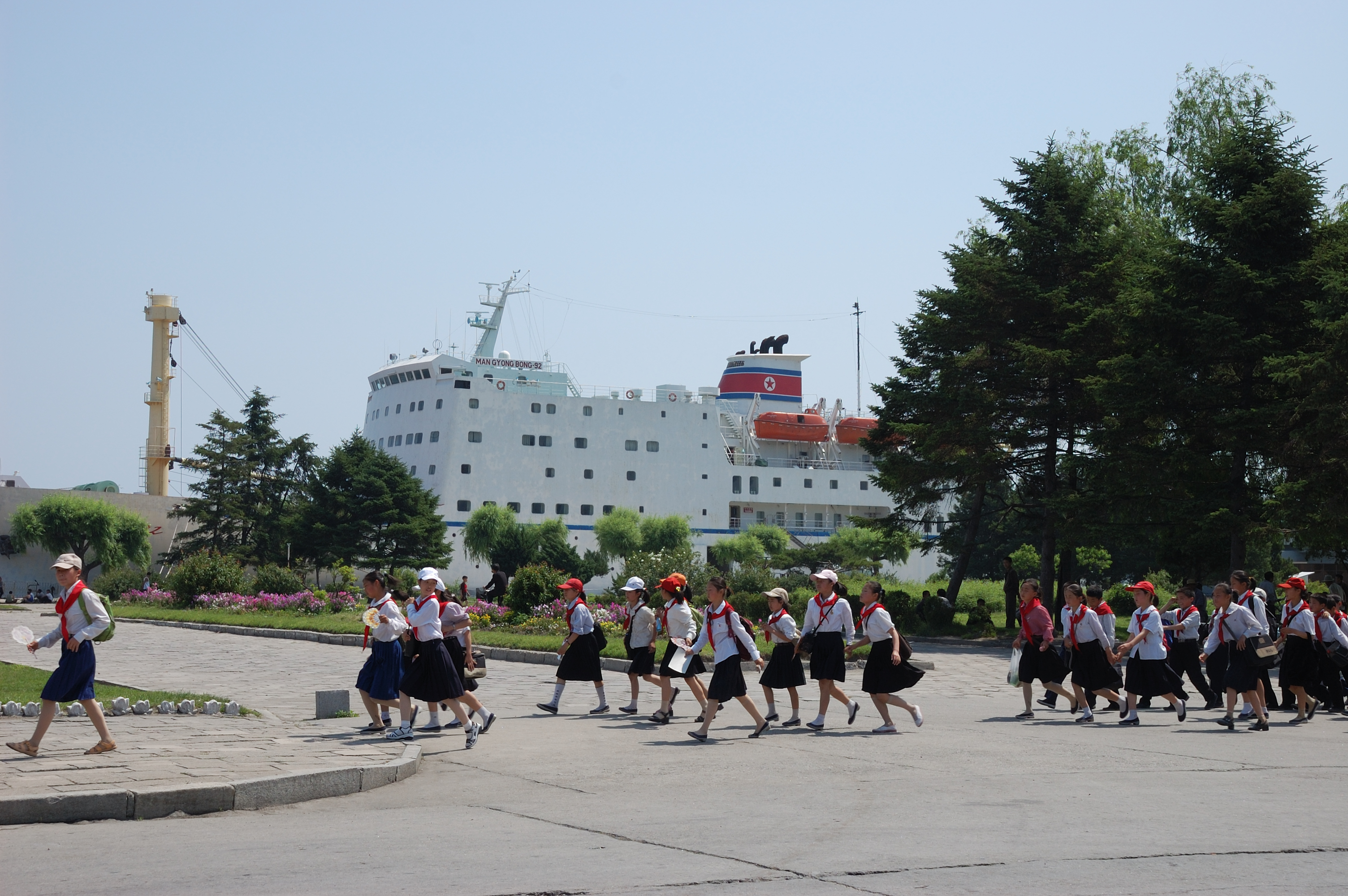
School children pass Man Gyong Bong 92 in North Korea.

The first Man Gyong Bong ship had its maiden voyage in September 1971, amidst Japan's easing restrictions on visits to North Korea by Zainichi Koreans. It was used to transport people between North Korea and Japan until it was replaced by the Man Gyong Bong 92 in 1992. The Man Gyong Bong 92 was constructed using a donation of 4 billion yen (approximately US $32 million) from the Japanese-based Chongryon (General Association of Korean Residents in Japan). The organisation gave the money to North Korea as a gift for Kim Il-sung's 80th birthday in 1992.

The ferry could carry 200 passengers and 1,000 tons of cargo. Before Japan banned all North Korean vessels from its waters in 2006, it made about one to two round trips per month between the Port of Niigata, Japan and Wonsan, North Korea, with a one-way trip lasting about 28 hours. Most of the passengers were North Korean Zainichi visiting relatives or students of a Chongryon school on a study trip. Cargo shipped from Japan was typically electronics, medical devices, and foreign-made manufactured goods. In August 1993, a first-class ticket on the Man Gyong Bong 92 would cost about US $1,500 each.

== Controversy with Japan ==
In September 2002, the North Korean government admitted to abducting several Japanese citizens throughout the late 1970s and early 1980s. This admission caused people to believe the first Man Gyong Bong, operating since 1971, was used to transport these abductees to North Korea. This assumption sparked further suspicion surrounding the ferry's successor, the Man Gyong Bong 92, that was still in operation.

The main allegation against the Man Gyong Bong 92 was that it allowed the smuggling of illegal items to and from Japan. Specifically, it was believed that drugs and weapons were being smuggled into Japan, and cash, missile parts, and other potentially dangerous technology were secretly being taken to North Korea.

These suspicions were supported by several confessions made in 2003 by former North Korean citizens and allies. In late January 2003, Kim Sang-gyu, a former senior official of Chongryon, admitted to running an espionage network in Japan for North Korea until 2000. He confessed to receiving his orders from Pyongyang through various high-ranking crew members aboard the Man Gyong Bong 92.

On May 20, 2003, a former North Korean missile scientist testified at a U.S. Senate hearing that the Man Gyong Bong 92 transported 90% of the missile parts used by North Korea. These components were suspected of having been obtained from typical Japanese electronics such as game consoles and digital cameras, which would also make them easier to smuggle out of the country.

In August 2003, the Yomiuri Shimbun reported that a North Korean defector confessed to smuggling drugs for North Korea into Japan through the Man Gyong Bong 92. He would deliver these drugs to a member of Chongryon, who would then deliver the drugs to the Japanese yakuza. This confession supported the U.S. State Department testimonies made in May of that year, that North Korea's methamphetamine market in Japan provided the government with a profit of up to US $7 billion.

These allegations were denied by both the North Korean government and the head of Chongryon's foreign affairs bureau, So Chung-on. While there was not enough evidence to support these allegations, that didn't stop Japanese suspicions. Since the abduction admission, Japan began a stricter enforcement of regulations on North Korean vessels, especially the Man Gyong Bong 92. In one instance, the threat of a thorough inspection supposedly caused the Man Gyong Bong 92 to remain in North Korea and to cancel its voyage, one that was to be the first to Japan in five months.

== Japanese ban ==
On July 5, 2006, North Korea launched seven missiles, one of which was a long-range Taepodong-2 missile capable of reaching Alaska. While all missiles landed in the Sea of Japan, Japan responded by banning the Man Gyong Bong 92 from Japanese waters for six months.

In early October 2006, this ban became permanent and was imposed on all North Korean vessels, following North Korea's nuclear tests.

== Implementation for tourism ==
With the Man Gyong Bong 92 no longer able to make its intended trip to Japan, North Korea refurbished the ferry to serve as a cruise ship. The Man Gyong Bong 92's new route traveled along the east coast of North Korea between Rason, in the northeast, and Mount Kumgang, near the South Korean border. The purpose of this cruise was to boost North Korea's tourism, the one industry that is exempt from United Nations economic sanctions. The tourists would meet in Yanji, China and drive three hours to Rason, North Korea. The Man Gyong Bong 92 would take them to Mount Kumgang, a scenic tourist destination complete with beaches and a golf resort. This area was jointly operated by North and South Korea until the fatal shooting of a South Korean tourist by a North Korean soldier in 2008, upon which all South Korean property was seized by the North.

The trial run of the cruise took place in late August 2011. Many of the approximately 200 passengers were travel agents, media, and North Korean officials, with some paying about US $470 for the 5-day trip on both land and sea. The trip south to Mount Kumgang took about 21 hours while the trip back took about 22 hours. In contrast to the lavish send-off the ship received in Rason, the passengers were cramped into bedrooms and were assigned either a wooden bunk bed or a mattress on the floor. Meals were also simple and served "cafeteria-style".

In February 2013, North Korea reported replacing the Man Gyong Bong 92 with a Singaporean cruise ship called the Royale Star. Satellite images subsequently placed the Man Gyong Bong 92 in Wonsan Harbor.

In September 2014, North Korea was expected to send a report to Japan that addressed the fate of the 1970s-1980s abductees. In August, though, the country made further requests for Japan to ease sanctions and provide further humanitarian aid in return for the report. These requests were suspected to be aimed at the allowance of the Man Gyong Bong 92 into Japanese waters.

In March 2015, Japan continued to apply sanctions against North Korea when no further reports were made regarding the abductees, leaving the Man Gyong Bong 92 anchored in Wonsan. In 2017, the ferry performed a trial run between Rason and Vladivostok, Russia.

== 2018 Winter Olympics ==
In February 2018, the ship docked at Mukho, South Korea, carrying a 140-person orchestra for the 2018 Winter Olympics. The ship also carried an art troupe and was the first North Korean ship to arrive in South Korea since 2002. This ship carried, among other people, a 150 person North Korean delegation for the 2018 Winter Olympics to the port of Mukho, under a special exemption from a 16 year ban on North Korean vessels. It was subsequently greeted by protesters opposing North Korea and Kim Jong-un, and protesters singing "Aegukga", the National Anthem of South Korea.

== Significance ==
As the primary connection between North Korea and Japan, the Man Gyong Bong 92 was extremely important to North Koreans living in Japan. For many, it offered the only contact with family members residing in North Korea. During the late 1950s and early 1960s, there was a mass repatriation of Zainichi from Japan to the seemingly rich and prosperous North Korea. While this movement began to die down soon afterwards, over 93,000 Koreans and about 6,000 Japanese moved to North Korea between 1959 and 1984, each of them forced to remain there due to North Korea's strict laws. As a result, this separation became a convenient way for North Korea to maintain the loyalty from repatriated citizens' family members in Japan. Nevertheless, both the first Man Gyong Bong and the Man Gyong Bong 92 offered a connection between families that were commonly separated from this movement.

The Man Gyong Bong 92 was also extremely important to Chongryon as it brought them money and gifts from the North Korean government. The presence of Chongryon and the Man Gyong Bong 92, though, was perceived as a threat towards the Japanese by having the "enemy" in their own backyard. In response, political moves, such as the creation of the NARKN, have taken place. Social changes have occurred as well where Koreans, particular students at Chongryon schools, are harassed. And suspicions of North Korean ploys, like those regarding the Man Gyong Bong 92 smugglings, would only increase the intensity of this behavior.

== Specifications ==
- Tonnage: 9,672 tons
- Length: 162.1 m
- Width: 20.5 m
- Speed: 23 knots
- Capacity: 200 passengers and 1,000 tons of cargo
