= Korea University (Japan) =

University in Kodaira, Tokyo

Coordinates: 35°43′26.3″N 139°26′54.5″E

- 朝鮮大学校 조선대학교
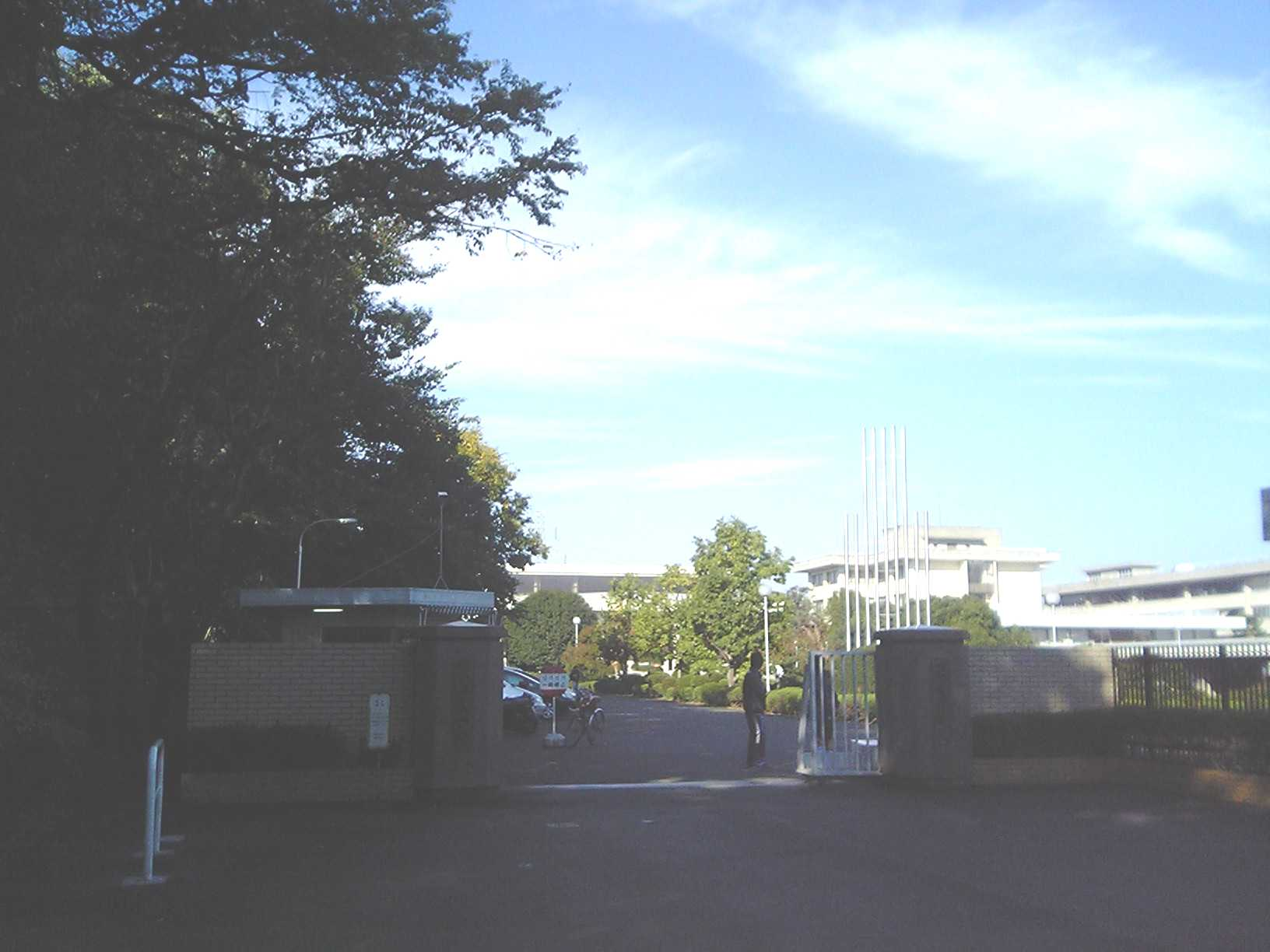
- Established: 10 April 1956
- Location: 1-700 Ogawa-machi, Kodaira, Tokyo, 187-8560, Japan
- Language: Korean
- Website: www.korea-u.ac.jp

Japanese name
- Kanji: 朝鮮大学校
- Hiragana: ちょうせんだいがっこう
Transcriptions
- Revised Hepburn: Chōsen daigakkō

North Korean name
- Chosŏn'gŭl: 조선대학교
- Hancha: 朝鮮大學校
Transcriptions
- Revised Romanization: Joseon daehakgyo
- McCune–Reischauer: Chosŏn taehakkyo

Korea University (朝鮮大学校; Korean: 조선대학교) is a university-level miscellaneous school located in Kodaira, Tokyo. It was established by the North Korea-affiliated organization Chongryon on 10 April 1956. Korean is the medium of instruction.

== Description ==
It operates eight four-year faculties:

- Political Economy
  - Political Economy
  - Jurisprudence
- Literature and History
  - Korean Language and Literature
  - History and Geography
- Business
- Foreign Languages
  - English
  - Japanese
- Science and Technology
  - Science with majors in Mathematics, Physics, Chemistry, and Biology
  - Electronics and Informatics
- Education
  - Education with majors in Language, Maths, Social Studies, and Science
  - Nursing
  - Music Education
  - Art Education
- Physical Education

The university also operates a two-year faculty with courses in accounting and social care, and a post-graduate school.

This school offers a university level education, but based on the Japanese School Education Law, it is not authorized as a “university” and consequently it is treated as a "miscellaneous school.”

== History ==
The school was first established by Chongryon on 10 April 1956. When Chongryon first sought approval to establish the school, it faced backlash from both the Japanese right-wing and South Korea. North Korea has influenced the school's textbooks and curriculum since its establishment.

The school has received funding directly from the government of North Korea every year since 1956. Between 1956 and 1958, the North Korean government paid ¥321.6 million to purchase the real estate for the school and set up its curriculum. In 2002, it received ¥132.42 million in funding at the direction of then North Korean leader Kim Jong Il.

After graduation, most students either go on to work for Chongryon or become teachers at Chongryon-affiliated schools. As of July 2001, the school's rector is Chang Byong Tae, a graduate of Kyoto University and a former researcher in solid-state chemistry with the French National Centre for Scientific Research.

Korea University and other Chongryon-affiliated schools have recently experienced greater difficulty in recruiting new students. This has been attributed to Japan's overall preference towards South Korea since its economic boom in the late 1980s. Correspondingly, ethnic Koreans in Japan have also increasingly aligned themselves with the South.

== Analysis ==
Between 2018 and 2019, Cha Eun-jeong, a South Korean anthropologist from Seoul National University, was allowed to visit the school a number of times. When she first visited the school, she did so without prior notice, and was turned away with the explanation that they "do not officially accept guests from the Southern side". (Note: 『우리는 공식적으로 남측 손님을 받지 않는다.』) However, she was eventually allowed to visit after explaining her intention to help bridge North–South relations.

Cha estimated that the school had around 500 students that all lived in the school dormitories. She noted that the school strongly emphasized Korean national identity and community, and that teachers and students were all encouraged to develop strong personal and emotional relationships with each other.

While she noted that portraits of Kim Il Sung and Kim Jong Il were displayed prominently in the school, she described the overall attitude of the students towards the South as being conciliatory, if not even positive. She attributed this to two reasons: firstly, the students were fourth-to-fifth generation descendants of the original Korean settlers, and thus increasingly removed from the North–South conflict. In addition, she theorized that they were following the overall Japanese zeitgeist of increasing preference towards South Korea.

== See also ==
- Chōsen gakkō – North Korean primary and secondary schools in Japan
