= Chongryon =

Organisation for ethnic Koreans in Japan

General Association of Korean Residents in Japan
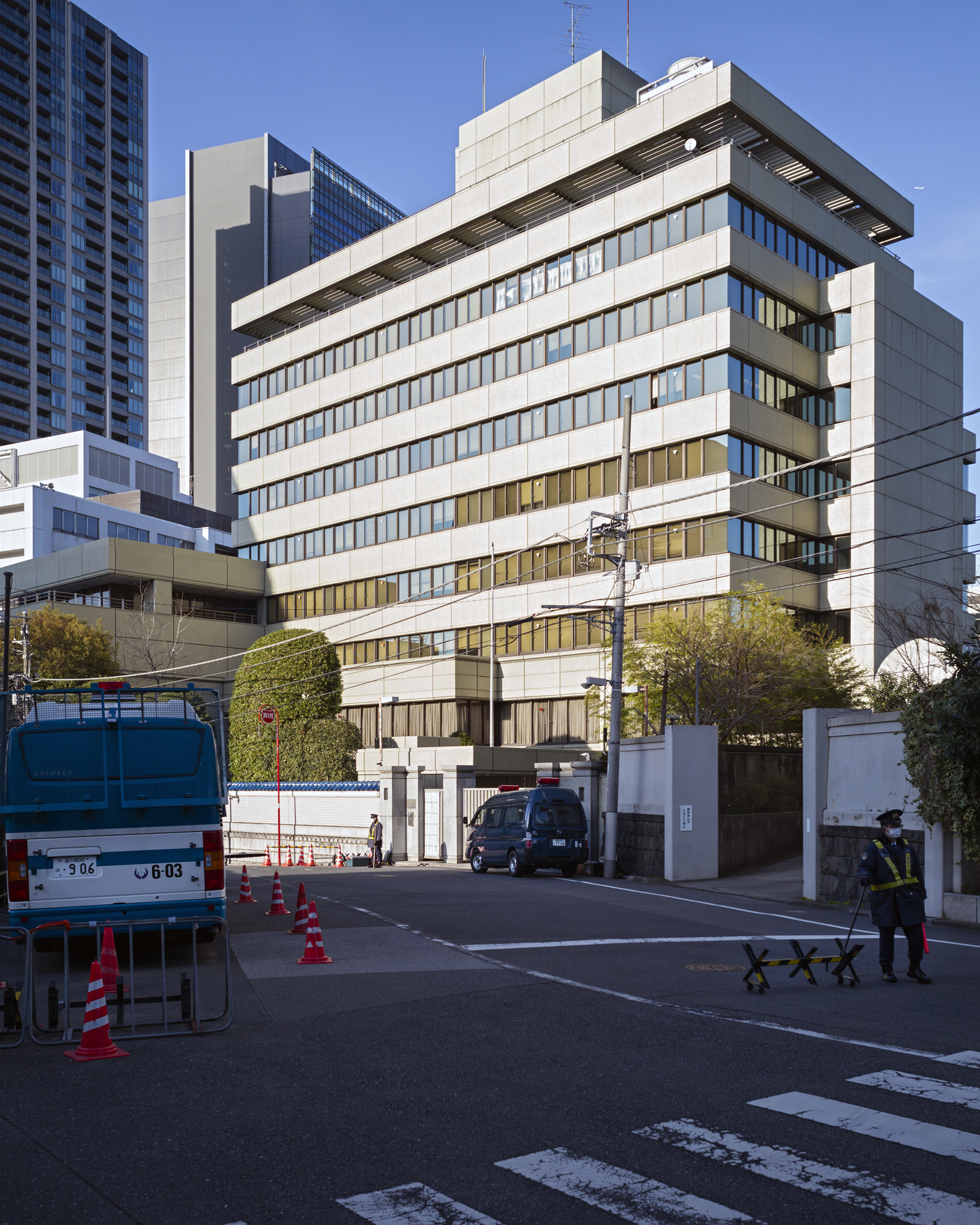
- Former headquarters of Chongryon, Chiyoda, Tokyo
- Abbreviation: Chongryon, Chōsen Sōren
- Predecessor: Minsen
- Formation: 25 May 1955; 71 years ago
- Type: NGO
- Location: Chiyoda, Tokyo, Japan
- Coordinates: 35.696972°N 139.7435°E
- Region served: Japan
- Official language: Korean, Japanese
- Chairman: Ho Jong-man
- First Vice-Chairman: Pak Ku-ho
- Vice-Chairman: Nam Sung-woo, Bai Jin-ku, Jo Il-yon, Song Kun-hak, So Chung-on, Kang Chu-ryon
- Key people: Han Duk-su, founder
- Main organ: General Assembly
- Parent organisation: United Front Department of the Workers' Party of Korea
- Website: www.chongryon.com

Japanese name
- Kanji: 在日本朝鮮人総聯合会 or 在日本朝鮮人総連合会
- Kana: ざいにほんちょうせんじんそうれんごうかい
Transcriptions
- Revised Hepburn: Zai-Nihon Chōsenjin Sōrengōkai

North Korean name
- Chosŏn'gŭl: 재일본조선인총련합회
- Hancha: 在日本朝鮮人總聯合會
Transcriptions
- Revised Romanization: Jaeilbon Joseonin Chongnyeonhaphoe
- McCune–Reischauer: Chaeilbon Chosŏnin Ch'ongnyŏnhaphoe

The General Association of Korean Residents in Japan, abbreviated as Chongryon (Korean: 총련; Hanja: 總聯; MR: Ch'ongnyŏn) or Chōsen Sōren (Japanese: 朝鮮総連), is one of two main organisations for Zainichi Koreans (Korean citizens or residents of Japan), the other being Mindan. It has close ties to North Korea and functions as North Korea's de facto embassy in Japan, as there are no diplomatic relations between the two countries. The organisation is headquartered in Chiyoda, Tokyo, and there are prefectural and regional head offices and branches throughout Japan.

Mindan, officially the Korean Residents Union in Japan, contrastingly consists of Zainichi Koreans who have adopted South Korean nationality. As of 2018, among 610,000 Korean residents in Japan who have not adopted Japanese nationality, 25 percent are affiliated with the Chongryon, and 65 percent are affiliated with Mindan. As of 2016, PSIA reported that Chongryon had 70,000 members.

Chongryon's strong links to North Korea, its allegiance to the North Korean ideology and its opposition to integration of Koreans into Japanese society have made it controversial in Japan. Acts which Chongryon officials are suspected of include notably the 1977–1983 abduction of Japanese nationals, illicit transfer of funds to North Korea, espionage, drug trafficking and the smuggling of electronics and missile parts. The Chongryon has been described by the Washington Post as a "very effective sanctions-busting enterprise". Its wide variety of businesses, including banks and pachinko parlors, are used to generate funds for the North Korean government.

Numerous organisations are affiliated with the Chongryon, including 18 mass propaganda bodies and 23 business enterprises, with one of its most important business sectors being pachinko. The organisation also operates about 60 Korean schools and a Korean university, as well as banks and other facilities in Japan. Chongryon schools teach a strong pro-North Korean ideology.

In recent years, the organization has run into severe financial trouble, with debts of over US$750 million, and was ordered by court in 2012 to dispose of most of its assets, including its Tokyo headquarters.

According to an interview with Mitsuhiro Suganuma, former head of the Public Security Intelligence Agency's Second Intelligence Department in 2014, Chongryon is under the control of the United Front Department of the Workers' Party of Korea's Liaison Department.

== Background and history ==
Long-term ethnic Korean residents in Japan primarily consist of those, and descendants of, ethnic Koreans who settled in Japan as:

- Migrants during Japan's rule over Korea (1910–1945)
- Conscripted labourers during the Second World War
- Post-World War II refugees, especially from Jeju island escaping the 1948 Jeju massacre.

A 1953 government survey revealed that 93% were from the southern half of the Korean peninsula.

From 1910 to 1945, ethnic Koreans were Japanese nationals. The end of the Second World War left the nationality status of Koreans in an ambiguous position, as no recognized functional government existed on the Korean Peninsula (the Provisional Government of the Republic of Korea, a government-in-exile, was only somewhat recognized internationally and was not a formal Korean government until South Korea's formation in 1948). Their nationality was provisionally registered under the name of Joseon (Chōsen in Japanese, 朝鮮, 조선), the old name of undivided Korea.

The 1948 declaration of independence by both South and North Korea made Joseon a defunct nation. Those with Joseon nationality were allowed to re-register their nationality to a South Korean one; however the same did not apply to North Korea due to the fact that Japan only recognises South Korea as the legitimate government of Korea, so supporters of the North retained their Joseon nationality.

Ethnic Koreans in Japan established the League of Koreans in Japan (재일본조선인연맹) in 1945, which followed a socialist ideology, and was banned in 1949 by the order of Allied occupation army. The United Democratic Front of Korea in Japan (재일조선민주전선) was established in 1951, which was banned due to suspected involvement in the 1952 May Day riots.

In 1952, the North Korean leader Kim Il Sung called on the socialist Zainichi Korean movement to be coordinated in close contact with the North Korean government, and to fight, not for a socialist revolution in Japan, but for the socialist reunification of the Korean peninsula.

Chongryon was established on 25 May 1955 by Han Duk-su, who was an activist for leftist labor movements in Japan.

In the late 1950s, Chongryon conducted a campaign to persuade Zainichi Koreans to migrate to North Korea in collaboration with Tokyo. Approximately 70,000 people moved to North Korea under this campaign during a two-year period from 1960 through 1961. The campaign was vehemently opposed by Mindan which organised hunger strikes and train obstructions. Some 87,000 Zainichi Koreans and about 6,000 Japanese spouses moved to the North. Following the normalization of ties between Japan and South Korea, migration to North Korea slowed to a trickle but continued up to 1984. Overall, 93,340 people moved to North Korea from Japan between 1959 and 1984 through the efforts of Chongryon. The migrants were persuaded by propaganda describing North Korea as a utopia wealthier than Japan with better human rights protections. Viewing Koreans as outsiders, the Japanese government collaborated with the program.

Zainichi Koreans who migrated to North Korea were mostly disappointed by the living conditions they found there. They were also discriminated against due to their Japanese origins under the songbun social classification system. Most were assigned to live in rural areas. Many were made to work at collective farms, mines, and coal pits. They were kept under strict surveillance, with those caught attempting to defect tortured and sent to labor camps. Japanese research puts the number of Zainichi Korean returnees condemned to prison camps at around 10,000. Though barred from returning to Japan, they were allowed to maintain contact with relatives there and collect financial remittances from them, which ended up becoming a major source of income for the North Korean government. According to Andrei Lankov:

"Most of the returnees were gravely disappointed by the destitution they saw upon arrival. They soon realized, however, that there was no way back. Stuck in a destitute police state, they (and their children) now found themselves in a strange position: they were simultaneously privileged and discriminated against. On the one hand, the returnees were seen as ideologically unreliable. On the other hand, most of them received money transfers from Japanese family members who were wise enough not to go to the Socialist Paradise. This allowed them to enjoy a life that was affluent by North Korean standards."

In 1990, Ha Su-to, former vice chief of organization for Chongryon who was expelled in 1972 for demanding democratic reforms, led a rally in Tokyo of 500 to protest against North Korea's human rights violations, in which protesters accused North Korea of holding the ex-Zainichi returnees captive to siphon money off remittances from their relatives in Japan.

In the 1990s, Chongryon membership began declining, with younger generations taking Japanese or South Korean citizenship. It was also around this time that remittances to North Korea began to dry up as the immediate relatives of the first-generation migrants began to die and the subsequent generations had no desire to send money to people they had never met. This resulted in a downgrade in the economic status of the second and third generation descendants of the migrants.

=== Tensions with Japan, legal issues and illegal activities ===
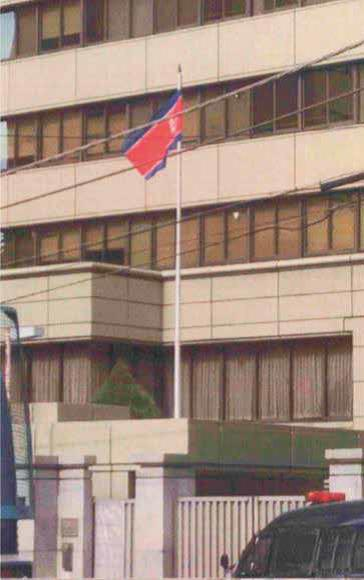
The DPRK flag hoisted in Chongryon.

For a long time, Chongryon enjoyed unofficial immunity from searches and investigations, partly out of respect for its role as North Korea's de facto embassy, and partly due to its power as an ethnic political pressure group. However, escalating tensions between Japan and North Korea over a number of issues, namely its nuclear weapons programme, firing of missiles over Japan and abduction of Japanese nationals has led to protests and public animosity against Chongryon due to its active support of the Pyongyang regime. Acts which Chongryon officials are suspected of include illicit transfer of funds to North Korea, drug smuggling, espionage, and the smuggling of electronics and missile parts. The Chongryon has been described by the Washington Post as a "very effective sanctions-busting enterprise". Its wide variety of businesses, including banks and pachinko parlors, are used to generate funds for the North Korean government.

Kim Kil-uk, a former head of a Chongryon school in Osaka, is suspected of being involved in the 1980s kidnapping of Japanese citizens. Kim, who fled to North Korea, remains on Interpol’s wanted list. In March 2006, Osaka police raided six facilities, including the North Korean Chamber of Commerce, in an investigation into the circumstances surrounding the June 1980 disappearance of one of the abductees, Tadaaki Hara. All six facilities were linked to Chongryon.

Since allegations of Pyongyang's nuclear weapons programme first surfaced in the early 1990s, Chongryon has frequently reported being targeted by hate mail and malicious phone calls, as well as numerous other incidents. Chongryon facilities have also frequently been sites of protests by Japanese right-wing groups. There have been numerous incidents of students of Chongryon schools, identifiable by their uniforms based on traditional Korean clothing, suffering verbal abuse. Furthermore, around May and June 1994 there was a series of physical assaults on Chongryon students in which their uniforms were cut. In 1998, a petrol bomb was thrown at Chongryon's headquarters in Tokyo, causing minor damage. In June 2003, a shot was fired into a Chongryon warehouse in Niigata, hitting cargo waiting to be loaded onto Mangyongbong-92. In October 2006 in the aftermath of North Korea's first nuclear test, a suspected arson attack damaged a bamboo grove inside Chongryon's school in Mito. The Zaitokukai received criticism from a District Court for harassing Chongryon-affiliated schoolchildren.

The Japanese authorities have recently started to crack down on Chongryon activities, moves usually criticised by Chongryon as acts of political suppression. The first raid on Chongryon facilities was in 1994, when a rally held in Osaka by Rescue the North Korean People (RENK), a Japanese citizens group set up to help refugees and demand democracy and human rights in North Korea, was attacked and broken up by a 100-strong mob. Police investigations revealed that the disruption was orchestrated by Chongryon.

In 2000, a member of a Japanese criminal group was arrested after purchasing 250kg (550lbs) of amphetamines from Cho Gyu-son in the North Korean port of Wonsan. Cho was the former head of a Chongryon school in Shimonoseki before becoming the founder of what was ostensibly a trading company. He remains on the Japanese police's wanted list. Japan was a major target market for North Korean-sponsored methamphetamine drug trafficking. In August 2003, the Yomiuri Shimbun reported that a North Korean defector confessed to smuggling drugs for North Korea into Japan through the Mangyongbong-92. He would deliver these drugs to a member of Chongryon, who would then deliver the drugs to the Japanese yakuza. This confession supported the U.S. State Department testimonies made in May of that year, that North Korea’s methamphetamine market in Japan provided the government with a profit of up to US $7 billion.

In November 2001, police raided the Tokyo headquarters of Chongryon and its Tokyo regional office as part of an investigation into alleged embezzlement by one of its senior officials. This followed an arrest of Kang Young-kwan, 66, a member of Chongryon's central standing committee and a former head of its financial bureau, among other Chongryon officials, who admitted diverting $6.5 million on behalf of Chongryon from the Tokyo Chogin, a credit union set up to serve pro-North Korean residents which failed in 1999. About 400 Chongryon supporters scuffled with police after they gathered in protest at what they called an act of political suppression and racial discrimination.

In 2002, Shotaro Tochigi, deputy head of the Public Security Intelligence Agency told a session of the House of Representatives Financial Affairs Committee that the agency is investigating Chongryon for suspected illicit transfers of funds to the North. In 2003, a North Korean defector made a statement to the US Senate committee stating that more than 90% of the parts used by North Korea to construct its missiles were brought from Japan aboard Mangyongbong-92, a Chongryon-operated ship which is the only regular direct link between North Korea and Japan. In 2003, The Associated Press reported that Japanese authorities are preparing to charge a 72-year-old former senior member of Chongryon who was engaged in espionage activities for using false identity. It was claimed that espionage instructions were relayed to him by the captain of Mangyongbong 92. Prime Minister Junichiro Koizumi told reporters "We must watch (the vessel) closely lest it be used for crime."

In July 2003, the Tokyo Metropolitan Government reversed a decision made in 1972 by the socialist Tokyo Governor Ryokichi Minobe to exempt Chongryon from property tax. Chongryon refused to pay, resulting in seizure of three Chongryon properties. In March 2006, following a ruling by Fukuoka High Court, the Internal Affairs Ministry instructed prefectural governments across Japan to review any property tax exemptions on Chongryon properties.

In May 2006, Chongryon and the pro-South Mindan agreed to reconcile, only for the agreement to break down the following month due to Mindan's distrust of Chongryon. North Korea's missile tests in July 2006 have deepened the divide, with Chongryon refusing to condemn the missile tests, instead only condemning the backlash. Mindan members expressed strong opposition to the agreement and accused the group’s top executives of holding secret reconciliation talks after the missile tests. Mindan’s chief and other executives resigned in July amid the fallout.

In November 2006, police raided the Chongryon's Tokyo headquarters in an investigation behind an attempt to illegally export 60 bags of intravenous solutions to North Korea. The solution was intercepted by Japanese customs as they were taken aboard Man Gyong Bong 92. It was reported that the solutions could have been used to make biological weapons, a claim denied by Chongryon. Crowds of Chongryon supporters tried to block access to the building, leading to deployment of riot police. In February 2007, police in Hokkaido raided ten locations linked to Chongryon, including its Hokkaido head office in Sapporo and a famous mutton yakiniku restaurant owned by a senior Chongryon official in Susukino, Sapporo, over alleged tax evasion amounting to tens of millions of yen. Four people, including the restaurant owner and a senior official of Chongryon's Sapporo chamber of commerce and industry, were arrested. Also in February 2007, Police raided several locations including Chongryon's Hyogo headquarters in Kobe, and arrested three people, including Song Gi-hwan, who heads the accounting division of Chongryon's Hyogo chamber of commerce and industry, over alleged unlicensed accounting. Riot police scuffled with a crowd of Chongryon supporters who gathered in protest. Footage of the raids were later released by Chongryon.

On 3 March 2007, thousands of Chongryon members staged a rally in Hibiya Park in protest against police investigations into the organisation and bullying of schoolchildren, which they called "political suppression and human rights abuses" by the Japanese authorities. The protesters, who numbered between 3000 (according to local media) and 7000 (according to Chongryon), staged a 2.9 km-long march wielding posters of the North Korean leader Kim Jong Il. Chongryon's number two, Nam Sung-u was quoted as saying "Japan's violations of human rights against the DPRK and Koreans in Japan cannot be allowed, no matter what". The Tokyo Metropolitan Government attempted to ban the protest fearing violence but they were overruled by a court ruling. Riot police scuffled with Japanese ultranationalist groups who had gathered in counterprotest resulting in one arrest. In June 2007, it was reported that Chongryon attempted to sell its main headquarters to Shigetake Ogata, (ex-head of the Public Security Intelligence Agency who now leads an investment firm) due to financial troubles and tensions with the Japanese government, however, creditors moved to block the sale in court and, according to North Korea's official news service article of 22 June 2007, the courts granted a Japanese collection agency the right to dispose of the property.

In 2011, following the death of Kim Jong-il, the Japanese government refused to issue re-entry permits to Chongryon personnel intending to attend his funeral in North Korea.

The South Korean National Election Commission considered preventing Chongryon residents from voting in the 2012 South Korean Presidential Election.

In 2014, Japanese courts blocked a Mongolian company from buying the Chongryon building.

In 2015, the Tokyo home of Ho Jong-man, chairman of Chongryon, was raided by the police in relation to 1,200 kilos of matsutake mushrooms illegally smuggled from North Korea.

In 2017, Korean scientists with strong ties to Chongryon, including Dr. Pyeon Cheol-ho, an assistant professor at Kyoto University's Research Reactor Institute, were accused of conducting espionage to aid the North Korean nuclear weapons program. In particular, Pyeon's research on neutrons could be used to achieve the miniaturization of nuclear warheads for use in intercontinental ballistic missiles. It has been reported that Pyeon has visited North Korea on seven occasions between 1992 and 2008.

On 23 February 2018, the Chongryon building was targeted in an attack when two persons in a van opened fire at the compound before 4 in the morning. They were eventually arrested by police and were identified as Satoshi Katsurada, a right-wing activist and Yoshinori Kawamura, an ex-yakuza member with the latter confirmed as the person responsible for firing a gun with five shots fired.

=== Since the 2010s ===
In 2019, Chongryon students protested in Tokyo when the Japanese government excluded Pyongyang-affiliated schools from a new government subsidy program, although local governments continue to fund Chongryon students. Students held up banners denouncing the "discrimination and persecution against Koreans". Ken Kato, the director of Human Rights in Asia and a long-time campaigner against North Korea’s rights abuses said "These are the sort of 'model North Korean citizens' who are teaching their youngsters, and it’s absolutely not right that Japanese taxpayers’ money is being spent to promote a murderous and corrupt regime".

On 17 May 2019, it was announced that Japanese law enforcement will continue to monitor Chongryon activities due to its close ties with North Korea. On 9 July 2020, an anti-riot officer stationed near Chongryon killed himself while he was off duty with his own sidearm.

In December 2023, the South Korean Ministry of Unification began investigating actor Kwon Hae-hyo, producer Cho Eun-seong and film director Kim Jee-woon for unauthorized contact with North Koreans after making a documentary highlighting discrimination in Chongryon schools. Article 9 of the Inter-Korean Exchange and Cooperation Act states that South Korean citizens must notify the Ministry of Unification in advance if they intend to contact a citizen of North Korea, even if abroad. This legislation especially applies to those seeking to make contact with people linked to Chosen schools that are affiliated with the Chongryon. However, if the person being contacted is a citizen of South Korea, no advance notification is required. Cho Eun-seong stated, "in the past 10 years, I have made several documentaries related to Koreans in Japan and this is the first time something like this has happened."

The news of Seoul's investigations sparked controversy in the Zainichi community, with many fearing they could be suspected as a spy for simply speaking to someone North Korean. A restaurant owner, who is an ethnic Korean and third-generation immigrant in Japan, stated, "It’s perfectly natural for Koreans who have been in Japan for several generations to be on familiar terms with [North Koreans]. It’s certainly nothing to report to the authorities."

In January 2026, a Japanese court ordered Chongryon to pay damages to North Koreans who were lured by their repatriation paradise program.

On April 14, 2026, Pyongyang has provided Chongryon with $2 million to support education efforts.

On October 27, 2026, some sanctioned Chongryon officials were allowed to enter Japan.

== Organization ==
=== Ideology ===
On their website, Chongryon claims that all their activities are based around the concept of Juche, the official state ideology of North Korea.

Chongryon opposes the use of the Japanese word Kita-Chosen ("North Korea") as an abbreviation of the Democratic People's Republic of Korea. It refers to the country as Kyōwakoku ("The Republic") or Sokoku ("The Fatherland"). In 1972, Chongryon campaigned to get the Japanese media to stop referring to North Korea as Kita-Chosen. This effort was not successful, but as a compromise, most media companies agreed to refer to the DPRK with its full official title at least once in every article. By January 2003, this policy started to be abandoned by most newspapers, starting with Tokyo Shimbun, which announced that it would no longer write out the full name, followed by Asahi, Mainichi and Nikkei.

Chongryon claims to be a representative body of overseas North Korean citizens living in Japan and rejects the notion that they are a mere ethnic minority.

Out of the two main Korean organisations in Japan, Chongryon has been the more militant in advocating retention of Korean ethnic identity. It is generally opposed to Korean-Japanese integration into Japanese society; for example, it strongly encourages marriage within the Chrongryon community and has established a marriage counseling center in order to continue the "sacred work of preserving national identity and continuing the Korean lineage within the Korean-Japanese community". It also rejects Zainichi Koreans' right to vote or participate in Japanese regional elections, which it sees as an unacceptable attempt at assimilation into Japanese society. This is in contrast to Mindan, which is campaigning for wider Zainichi Korean participation in Japanese politics.

=== Membership ===
Chongryon members primarily consist of those who have retained their registration as Joseon nationals (Japanese: Chōsen-seki), instead of taking or being born with Japanese or South Korean nationality. Joseon nationality was a legal status that the Japanese government defined in the aftermath of World War II, when the government of the Korean peninsula was in an undetermined state. Prior to the end of World War II, Korea was administered by the Japanese government as being part of Japan, thus the legal nationality of Koreans, both in Japan and in Korea, was Japanese. As of 2022 there were around 25,000 people with the Joseon status, compared to over 409,000 registered South Korean nationals in Japan.

Five other senior Chongryon officials are also members of the Supreme People's Assembly (North Korea's parliament).

The PSIA reported that Chongryon had 70,000 members in 2016.

=== Official activities ===
Chongryon runs support and advisory services for members, such as legal and marriage advice and employment help. It is responsible for issuing North Korean passports.

Chongryon-affiliated organisations operate businesses and banks to provide jobs, services and social networks for Zainichi Koreans outside of mainstream society. In 1990, the Chongryon banking system was capitalized to around $25 billion. In the 1970s and 1980s, these organizations constituted an important economic link between North Korea and Japan. The Chongryon-affiliated companies monitored the Tokyo Stock Exchange to enable the DPRK to sell its non-ferrous metals and other mineral products at the most advantageous prices, and purchased inexpensive Japanese consumer goods for re-export to the Comecon countries. Chongryon supporters are thought to control as much as one third of the pachinko industry in Japan. An important function of these enterprises is earning hard currency to be remitted to Pyongyang. These remittances have been estimated at between $600 million and $1.9 billion each year but are probably much lower. Chongryon announced plans on 17 March 2010 to open three restaurants in Pyongyang; each restaurant will be managed by the main headquarter in Tokyo, the Kantō regional chapter, and the Kinki-Tōkai regional chapter.

Chongryon publishes the Choson Sinbo newspaper as well as magazines and other publications. Websites run by Chongryon-affiliated organisations include the English-language People's Korea. Chongryon also runs cultural activities and sports teams representing its members.

Chongryon organises trips by members to North Korea, usually to visit relatives, as well as educational visits for students of Korean schools. They operated Man Gyong Bong 92, a passenger and cargo ferry which linked Niigata in Japan to Wonsan in North Korea, which served as the only direct link between the two countries, and is a subject of much controversy. The ferry was barred from entering the Japanese port for six months in response to North Korea's July 2006 missile tests and was banned indefinitely following the 2006 North Korean nuclear test due to suspicions of smuggling electronics used in missiles.

The Congress, the highest legislative organ of Chongryon, has met every three years since 1961 to discuss its agenda, the election of key leaders and its budget.

On 25 November 2020, Pak Ku-ho replaced Ho Jong-man as the head of Chongryon due to the latter's health complications from diabetes.

The North Korean Chongryon-affiliated Fukushima Korean School sheltered 18 Japanese citizens from 18 March until the end of March. However, the Chongryon criticized the Ministry of Foreign Affairs of Japan for not officially recognizing North Korea as one of the countries that sent humanitarian aid to the survivors of the 2011 Tōhoku earthquake and tsunami.

Following the death of North Korean leader Kim Jong-il in December 2011, Chongryon ordered members to keep a low profile. Pupils at its schools were barred from speaking to reporters, Japanese and Westerners alike, who in turn were turned away from facilities.

In June 2012, the Japanese Supreme Court authorized the seizure of Chongryon properties to pay off debts incurred. In 2013 a bid was approved on the property by Ekan Ikeguchi who was subsequently unable to secure funding. In November 2014, Marunaka Holdings Co. purchased the property for ¥2.21 billion with plans to evict the Chongryon.

According to the Dong-A Ilbo, the Chongryon cooperated with Nike to make an advertisement addressing problems of Zainichi Koreans in 2020.

On 28 May 2022, Kim Jong Un sent a 10,000-character letter to the members.

==== Korean schools ====
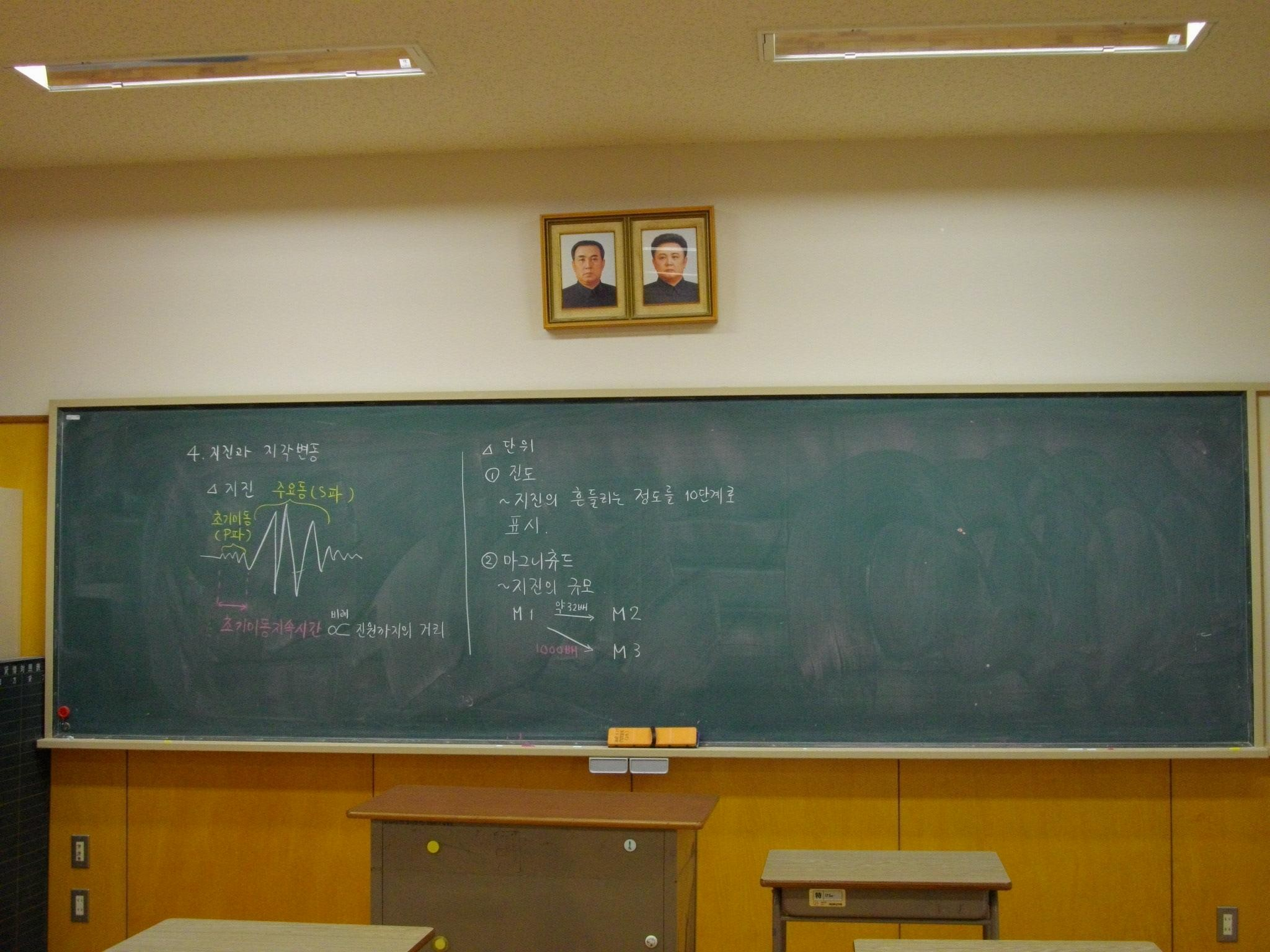
Classroom at Tokyo Korean High School with photographs of Kim Il Sung and Kim Jong Il

Chongryon operates 140 ethnic Korean schools (Chōsen gakkō 朝鮮学校 or chosŏn hakkyo 조선학교) across Japan, including kindergartens and one university, Korea University, initially partly funded by the North Korean government. All lessons and all conversation in the school are conducted in Korean. They teach a strong pro-North Korean ideology and glorify the regimes of Kim Il Sung, Kim Jong Il and Kim Jong Un. They are not classified as regular schools under Japanese law as they do not follow the national curriculum.

They are distinct from Kankoku gakkō (한국학교, 韓國學校, 韓国学校) which are overseas South Korean schools (재외한국학교, 在外韓國學校, 在外韓国学校) in Japan, which receive approval from the South Korean government and incorporate the South Korean educational curriculum and regular Japanese curriculum.

Their militant stance is increasingly coming under criticism from pupils, parents and the public alike. The number of pupils receiving ethnic education from Chongryon-affiliated schools has declined sharply in recent years, down to about 10,000 in 2009 from a high of 46,000 in the early 1970s, with many, if not most, Zainichi now opting to send their children to mainstream Japanese schools. As of March 2010, there were 12 Chōsen high schools with an enrollment of about 2,000 students.

The schools were initially funded by North Korea, but this money has dried up. Today funding comes partly from local Japanese authorities, and many schools are facing financial difficulties. The Japanese government has refused Chongryon's requests that it fund Korean schools, citing Article 89 of the Japanese Constitution, according to which use of public funds for education by "schemes not under public control" is prohibited. Chongryon calls this an act of racial discrimination. Funding from local authorities usually takes place in the form of special benefits paid to the families of pupils, as opposed to paying the schools directly, to avoid a blatant breach of Article 89.

Another issue is the high school equivalency examination, daiken, that qualifies those who have not graduated from a regular high school to apply for a place in a state university and take an entrance exam. Until recently, only those who had completed compulsory education (i.e., up to junior high school) were entitled to take the daiken; this meant pupils of ethnic schools had to do extra courses before being allowed to take the exam. In 1999 the requirement was amended so that anyone over a certain age was qualified. Campaigners were not satisfied because this still meant graduates of non-Japanese high schools had to take the daiken. In 2003, the Education Ministry removed the requirement to take the equivalency test from graduates of Chinese schools, Mindan-run Korean schools and international schools affiliated with Western nations and accredited by American and British organisations. However, this did not apply to graduates of Chongryon schools, saying it could not approve their curricula. The decision was left up to individual universities, 70% of which allowed Chongryon school graduates to apply directly.

The North Korean government sponsored Chongryon schools for 50 years with "funds for educational support" and "scholarships" totaling around 46 billion yen. The Japanese government has proposed covering the tuition for all private high schools in Japan, with the exception of the Chongryon schools. As the Chongryon high schools are not being covered by the tuition support, there have been conflicts within the Chongryon whether to make amendments to school policies or keep them as is.

Due to the issues described above, enrollment in schools run by Chongryon have declined sharply, and many of the children of Zainichi Koreans now choose to go to orthodox Japanese schools. The vast majority of Koreans in Japan attend regular Japanese schools or South Korean international schools. For example, in 2012 87% of Koreans in Osaka attend wholly Japanese schools which make no provisions for bilingual education.

==== American student exchange program ====
In January 2019, Korea University—Chongryon's only higher educational institution—hosted its first exchange program with US students from DePauw University. Held shortly before the February 2019 summit between Donald Trump and Kim Jong-un, the trip was widely reported in North Korean aligned media. Choson Sinbo ran several articles, one of which predicted warming and normalizing relations between the US and DPRK that was framed around the exchange. Jung Da Min of the South Korean Korea Times wrote that the visit "highlighted improving relations between the two countries on the government and non-government level".

=== Chongryon affiliates ===
- 3 Kindergartens
- 19 Elementary schools
- 34 Combined elementary and junior high schools
- 5 Combined elementary, junior high, and high schools
- 2 Junior high schools
- 3 Combined junior and senior high schools
- 4 High schools
- 1 University – Korea University
- 1 Academy – Chongryon Central Academy
- 8 Banks
- 1 Insurance company – Kumgang Insurance Company
- 12 Art groups

- Chongryon Film Studio
- Korean Literature and Art Studio
- Korean Music Studio
- Kumgangsan Opera Troupe
- Tokyo Korean Song and Dance Ensemble
- Northern Kanto Song and Dance Ensemble
- Tokai Korean Song and Dance Ensemble
- Kyoto Korean Song and Dance Ensemble
- Osaka Korean Song and Dance Ensemble
- Hyogo Korean Song and Dance Ensemble
- Hiroshima Song and Dance Ensemble
- Kyoshyo Song and Dance Ensemble

- Commercial enterprises

- Chugai Travel
- Korean—Japanese Export-Import Trading Company
- Donghae Commercial Company
- Korean Speciality Treading Company
- Chiyoda International Treading Company
- Kongtong Hungye Company
- Kyonghwa Commercial Company
- Runghung Merchant Company
- Near Ocean Transportation Company
- Haeyang Medicine Company

- Zainichi Korean Science and Technology Association
- Zainichi Korean Business and Industry League
- Zainichi Korean Youth Business and Industry Association
- Zainichi Korean Teachers' League
- Korean Central Education Association in Japan
- United Zainichi Korean Credit Association
- Zainichi Korean Human Rights Association
- Zainichi Korean Comment Publisher Association
- Zainichi Korean Social Scientist Association
- Zainichi Korean Health Association
- Zainichi Korean Literature and Art League
- Korean Art Research Institute
- Zainichi Korean Sport League
- United Koreans in Japan football team
- Korean Overseas Student League in Japan
- Zainichi Korean Student Committee
- Zainichi Korean Religious League
- Zainichi Korean Buddhist Association
- Zainichi Korean Historicism and Archaeology Association
- Korean Democratic Woman Association in Japan
- Korean Youth League in Japan (Chochong) (Note: Not confused with Korean Youth League in Japan (Hancheong), the youth wing of the Union for Korean Democratic Reunification in Japan.)
- Korean Reunification Comrades' Association in Japan
- Korean Peace Upholding Committee in Japan
- Choson Sinbo Publishing House
- Haku Sopang
- Korean Youth Society
- Korean Issue Research Institute
- Chongryon Unified Enterprise Propulsion Committee
- Compatriots' Marriage Introducing Center

== See also ==
- Ethnic issues in Japan
- General Association of Koreans in China
- Korean diaspora
- Juchesasangpa
- Mindan
- North Korean abductions of Japanese citizens
- Pyongyang (restaurant chain)
