= Japan–North Korea relations =

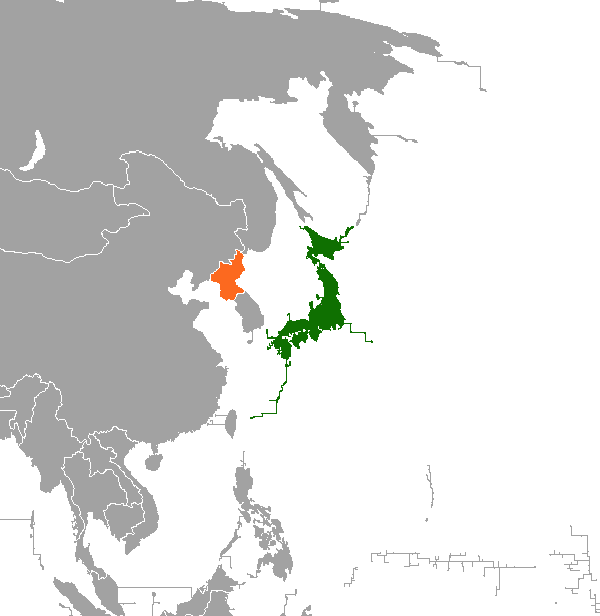

- Japan: North Korea

Japan–North Korea relations (Japanese: 日朝関係; Korean: 조일 관계) refers to international relations between Japan and North Korea. There are no diplomatic relations between Japan and North Korea and ties are severely strained and marked by tension and hostility. Japan does not recognize North Korea, instead recognizing the Republic of Korea as the sole legitimate government of Korea.

North Korea and Japan were parts of opposing blocs during the Cold War, with North Korea being allied with the Soviet Union and Japan allied with the United States. In 1955, North Korea assisted in establishing the General Association of Korean Residents in Japan, an organization for ethnic Koreans in Japan which acts as North Korea's de facto embassy. North Korea denounced the Treaty on Basic Relations between South Korea and Japan in 1965. Relations improved in the 1970s under Japanese Prime Minister Kakuei Tanaka, though they subsequently deteriorated again. North Korea nevertheless retained ties with the Japan Socialist Party, which was the main opposition in Japan.

Starting from the early 1990s, the two countries conducted lengthy negotiations aimed at establishing diplomatic relations, though the talks broke down over the issue of historical compensation. From 1977 to 1983, North Korea abducted Japanese citizens. North Korean leader Kim Jong Il admitted to the abductions in 2002, which led to outrage in Japan, as previously the kidnappings were dismissed as conspiracy theories. Relations deteriorated further due to North Korea's nuclear program, leading Japan to impose a wide range of sanctions and restrict trade. North Korea has also launched several ballistic missiles over Japanese territory. Japan sees North Korea as a critical threat to its national security, while North Korea has denounced Japan as militarist.

== History ==
=== 20th century ===
The Battle of Pyongyang and the Battle of the Yalu River became a major victory for the Empire of Japan in September 1894 during the First Sino-Japanese War which then established as Chōsen and has renamed the city of Heijō with millions of Zainichi Koreans are forced to change their new Japanese names and languages into Sōshi-kaimei as part of Japanization. Korea was annexed by Japan in 1910, two years before Kim Il Sung, the founder of North Korea was born on 15 April 1912 in Mangyongdae, Man'gyŏngdae District. In the first years after the proclamation of the North Korean state, relations between Pyongyang and Tokyo were mostly hostile and practically non-existent. Japan does not recognize and has never recognized North Korea as a country. In 1949–1950, the North Korean leadership vehemently condemned the economic and political negotiations between Japan and the administration of Syngman Rhee. Later, however, North Korea sought to take advantage of the conflict that erupted between Japan and South Korea over the Syngman Rhee Line. In response to the initiative of Japanese Prime Minister Ichirō Hatoyama, who sought to achieve a rapprochement with the Soviet Union and other Communist countries, in February 1955 North Korean Foreign Minister Nam Il issued a statement calling for economic and cultural cooperation with Japan. From 1955 to 1964, Japanese-North Korean economic relations underwent gradual expansion, partly because Pyongyang sought to prevent a Japanese-South Korean rapprochement by adopting a cooperative attitude toward Tokyo, and partly because North Korea tried to reduce its economic dependence on the Soviet Union.

In 1955, North Korea assisted in establishing the General Association of Korean Residents in Japan, Chongryon in Korean, which serves as an advocacy organization for ethnic Koreans in Japan who identify with the DPRK and acts as North Korea's de facto embassy in Japan. Voluntary repatriation of Korean residents from Japan to North Korea progressed slowly but smoothly after the conclusion of the Red Cross agreement of 1959. By late 1960, almost 50,000 of the estimated 600,000 Korean residents had arrived in North Korea aboard chartered Soviet ships. The repatriation program was extended for another year in October 1960 to accommodate the estimated 60,000 still wishing repatriation.

In 1965, the North Korean government sharply criticized the Treaty on Basic Relations between Japan and the Republic of Korea. Under Prime Minister Eisaku Satō, Japanese-North Korean relations underwent a deterioration, but in 1971–1972, the process of Sino-Japanese rapprochement induced Japanese companies to broaden their economic cooperation with North Korea. Under Prime Minister Kakuei Tanaka, the Japanese government adopted a policy of equidistance toward North Korea and South Korea, and refused to take sides with Seoul against Pyongyang during the Mun Se-gwang affair. Nevertheless, it still refrained from establishing diplomatic relations with North Korea. Under Takeo Miki and his successors, Japan switched back to a policy that clearly favored the ROK over the DPRK. The North Korean leadership felt increasingly isolated when Takeo Fukuda concluded the Treaty of Peace and Friendship between Japan and the People's Republic of China, and Yasuhiro Nakasone visited South Korea in 1983. In periods of Japanese-ROK cooperation and Japanese-DPRK friction, Pyongyang often expressed its dissatisfaction by raising the issue of the Liancourt Rocks dispute.

Until the late 1980s, North Korea's policy toward Japan was mainly aimed at minimizing cooperation between South Korea and Japan, and at deterring Japan's rearmament while striving for closer diplomatic and commercial ties with Japan. Crucial to this policy was the fostering within Japan of support for North Korea, especially among the Japanese who supported the Japanese communist and socialist parties and the Korean residents of Japan.

Over the years, however, North Korea did much to discredit itself in the eyes of many potential supporters in Japan. Japanese who had accompanied their spouses to North Korea had endured severe hardships and were prevented from communicating with relatives and friends in Japan. Japan watched with disdain as North Korea gave safe haven to elements of the Japanese Red Army, which Japan designates as a terrorist group. North Korea's inability or refusal to pay its debts to Japanese traders also reinforced popular Japanese disdain for North Korea.

Japan–North Korea relations turned more antagonistic in the late 1980s. The two governments did not maintain diplomatic relations and had no substantive contacts. The opposition Japan Socialist Party nonetheless had cordial relations with the North Korean regime. Japan allowed trade with North Korea only through unofficial channels, reportedly exceeding US$200 million annually in the 1980s.

Issues in Japan–North Korea relations that produced tensions included North Korean media attacks on Japan, Japan's imposition of economic sanctions on North Korea for terrorist acts against South Korea in the 1980s, and unpaid North Korean debts to Japanese enterprises of about $50 million. In 1998, North Korea successfully fired a Taepodong-1 ballistic missile that crossed over Japan and landed in the Pacific Ocean. This test launch was viewed as an act of political defiance, as negotiations on the future of North Korea's nuclear program development were taking place between North Korea and the United States in New York.

==== Normalization talks ====
In the early 1990s, Japan conducted lengthy negotiations with North Korea aimed at establishing diplomatic relations while maintaining its relations with Seoul. In September 1990 Japanese political delegation led by former deputy Prime Minister Shin Kanemaru of the Liberal Democratic Party visited North Korea. Following private meetings between Kanemaru and North Korean leader Kim Il Sung, a joint declaration released on September 28 called for Japan to apologize and to compensate North Korea for its period of colonial rule. Japan and North Korea agreed to begin talks aimed at the establishment of diplomatic relations. In January 1991, Japan began normalization talks with Pyongyang with a formal apology for its 1910–45 colonial rule of the Korean Peninsula. The negotiations were aided by Tokyo's support of a proposal for simultaneous entry into the United Nations by North Korea and South Korea; the issues of international inspection of North Korean nuclear facilities and the nature and amount of Japanese compensations, however, proved more difficult to negotiate.

Coincidental with the changing patterns in its relations with China and Russia, North Korea has moved to improve its strained relations with Japan. Pyongyang's primary motives appear to be a quest for relief from diplomatic and economic isolation, which has caused serious shortages of food, energy, and hard currency. Normalization of relations with Japan also raises the possibility of North Korea's gaining monetary compensation for the period of Japan's colonial rule (1910–45), a precedent set when Japan normalized relations with South Korea. The first round of normalization talks was held January 30–31, 1991, but quickly broke down over the question of compensation. Pyongyang has demanded compensation for damages incurred during colonial rule as well as for "sufferings and losses" in the post-World War II period. Japan, however, insists that North Korea first resolve its differences with South Korea over the question of bilateral nuclear inspections. Other points of contention are North Korea's refusal both to provide information about Japanese citizens who had migrated to North Korea with their Korean spouses in the 1960s, and the issue of Japanese soldiers taken prisoner by the Soviets during WWII and sent to North Korea.

=== 21st century ===
There have been several confrontations between the two nations over North Korean clandestine activity in Japan besides the abductions, including drug smuggling, marine poaching, and spying. North Korean missile tests are a concern for Japan because the missiles sometimes travel through Japanese airspace and territory. On February 13, 2007, the six-party talks produced an agreement in which North Korea agreed to shut down the Yongbyon nuclear facility in exchange for fuel aid and steps towards normalization of relations with both the United States and Japan. The two states held bilateral talks in September 2007, which were resumed in June 2008.

As of 2017, Japan–North Korea relations are at an all-time low after North Korea, on two separate occasions, test-launched nuclear capable ballistic missiles into Japanese waters. On March 17, 2017, Japan held the first ever evacuation drill after North Korean missile tests. On the same day, President Trump told North Korea that it was “behaving very badly” shortly after Secretary of State Rex Tillerson hinted at striking North Korea while on a visit to South Korea. In November 2019, North Korea's state media warned that Japan may see a real ballistic missile in the near future after the Japanese Prime Minister Shinzo Abe called Pyongyang's latest test of multiple-rocket launcher a ballistic missile launch. Later, in October 2021 and November 2022, North Korea launched more missiles that landed in Japanese waters. North Korea planned to test its missiles between May 31, 2023, and June 7, 2023, near the Sea of Japan. Japan said it will shoot down any missiles within a certain radius of its territory using its ballistic missile defense system.

In the early months of 2024, significant developments emerged in the international relations between Japan and North Korea. Both countries have signaled a readiness to engage in high-level talks, a move that marks a departure from decades of hostility and minimal diplomatic contact. The discussions are anticipated to focus on pivotal issues such as the return of Japanese nationals abducted by North Korea and the possibility of sanctions relief for Pyongyang, underscoring a mutual interest in altering the status quo of their relations. In January 2024, Kim Jong Un sent a telegram of condolence to Japanese Prime Minister Fumio Kishida, for the victims of the 2024 Sea of Japan earthquake and wishing the Japanese people a fast recovery. It marks the first time Kim has sent his condolences after a natural disaster, and the first time he has sent a telegram to Kishida. Prime Minister Fumio Kishida expressed his intent to hold a summit with Kim Jong Un, underscoring Japan's desire to resolve the abduction issue that has been a longstanding point of contention. This initiative is reflective of a broader strategic interest in improving bilateral relations and potentially easing regional tensions. On the North Korean side, Kim Yo Jong, the sister of Kim Jong Un, has also voiced a positive outlook on the future of North Korea-Japan relations, hinting at the possibility of a historic meeting that could herald a new era of diplomatic engagement between the two countries.

Japan and the United States have accused North Korean hackers of stealing cryptocurrency worth over $300 million from the Japan-based exchange DMM Bitcoin. The theft was attributed to the TraderTraitor group, believed to be part of the Lazarus Group, which is allegedly linked to North Korean authorities. The incident occurred in late May 2024, involving the theft of 4,502.9 Bitcoin. The theft involved the hackers using social engineering tactics to impersonate a recruiter on LinkedIn and send a malicious pre-employment test to an employee at a crypto wallet software company. This allowed them to compromise the employee's system and manipulate a legitimate transaction request from DMM, resulting in the loss of 4,502.9 Bitcoin. The FBI and Japan's National Police Agency are collaborating to combat North Korea's cybercrime activities, which date back to the mid-1990s and include a cyber-warfare unit known as Bureau 121. The Lazarus Group has previously gained notoriety for its involvement in high-profile hacks, including the 2014 cyberattack on Sony Pictures in retaliation for its production and distribution of The Interview, a political satire which portrays the fictional assassination of Kim Jong Un.

== Abductions of Japanese citizens ==
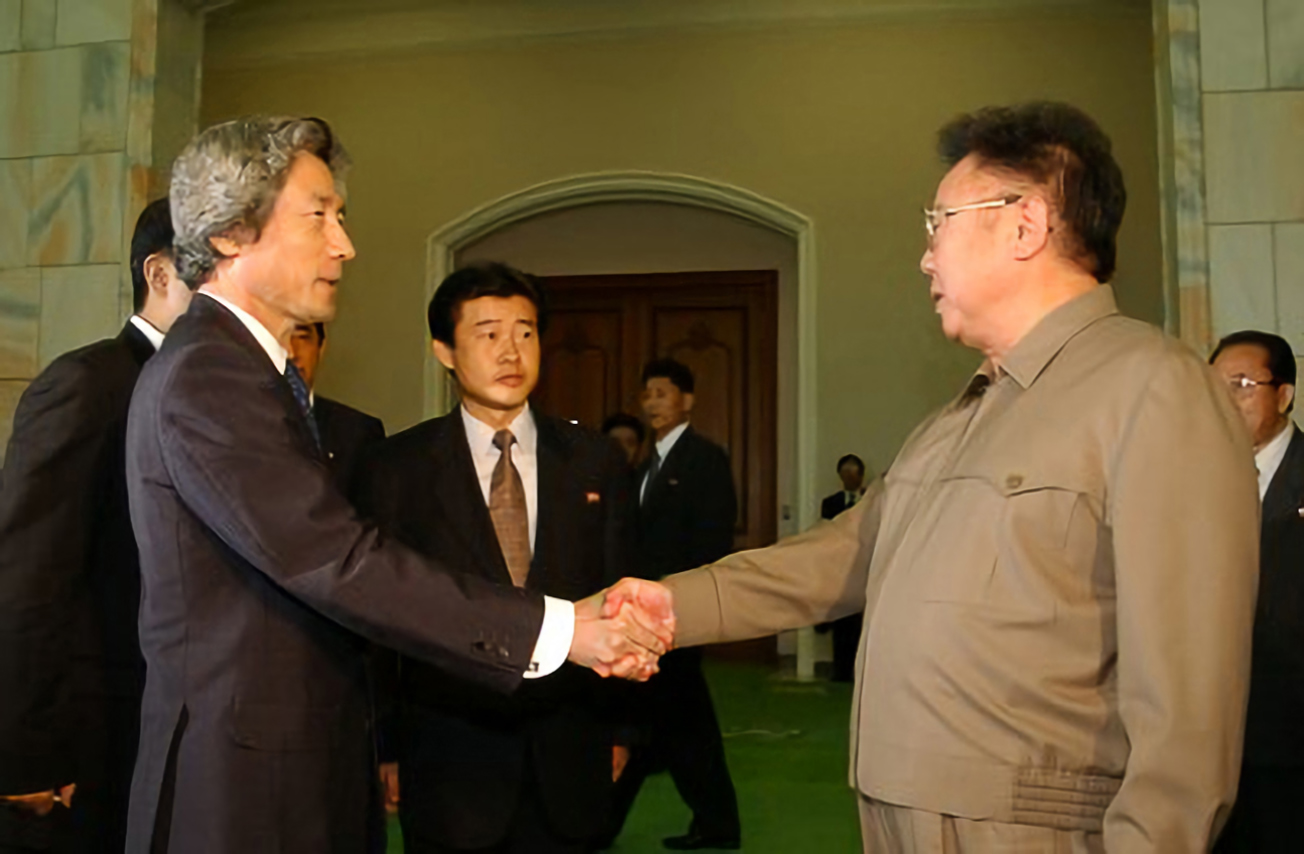
Prime Minister Junichiro Koizumi and Supreme leader Kim Jong-il in Pyongyang, 2002

The abductions of Japanese citizens from Japan by agents of the North Korean government occurred during a period of six years from 1977 to 1983. For many years North Korea denied the abductions, but it admitted to 13 of them in 2002. In one instance, Yi Un Hee, a Korean resident of Japan, was kidnapped to North Korea to teach Japanese in a school for espionage agents. In 2002 and 2004, Prime Minister Junichiro Koizumi made two high-profile visits to Pyongyang to press for their return.

On September 17, 2002, Japanese Prime Minister Junichiro Koizumi visited North Korea to meet North Korean leader Kim Jong Il for the First Japan–North Korea Summit, which eventually resulted in the Japan–North Korea Pyongyang Declaration. To facilitate normalization of relations with Japan, Kim admitted North Korea had abducted at least 13 Japanese citizens and issued an oral apology. North Korea's admittance was met outrage within both the Japanese government and the general public, as the allegations that were previously thought of as conspiracy theories had proved to be true. Japan retaliated by trying to isolate North Korea by cutting trade and other exchanges.

North Korea eventually returned five of the thirteen kidnapped, claiming the other eight had died. The positive effect on relations disintegrated when Japan claimed that a DNA test had proved that the returned remains of Megumi Yokota, kidnapped at 13 and said by North Korea to have committed suicide, were in fact not hers. Japan has pressed North Korea to come clean on the abduction, but Pyongyang insists that the issue has already been resolved.

Many North Korean citizens rely on money sent from relatives in Japan. Some in Japan believe that the government should threaten to cut off those remittances to force Pyongyang to make concessions. Others believe that the political right in Japan is exploiting that and other issues to advance its own nationalist agenda. US president Donald Trump brought up the issue at his meeting with Kim Jong Un at the request of the Japanese prime minister Shinzo Abe and he said that "it will be worked on."

On 29 March 2024, North Korean Foreign Minister Choe Son Hui reaffirmed Pyongyang's position to refuse any communication with Japan, stating that engaging in dialogue with Tokyo is of no significance to her country. The minister expressed disapproval of Prime Minister of Japan Fumio Kishida's commitment on 28 March 2024 to persist in addressing matters concerning North Korea, such as the historical abductions of Japanese citizens.

== Public opinion ==
According to a 2014 BBC World Service poll, 91% of Japanese people view North Korea's influence negatively, with just 1% expressing a positive view; the most negative perception of North Korea in the world. According to a March 2026 poll by The Yomiuri Shimbun and the Japan Institute of International Affairs, 87% of Japanese think North Korea poses a threat to Japan’s national security.

== See also ==
- History of Japan–Korea relations
- Japan–Korea disputes
- Japan–South Korea relations
- Foreign relations of Japan
- Foreign relations of North Korea
- North Korean ghost ships
- Japanese people in North Korea
- Japan–North Korea Pyongyang Declaration
- Chōsen gakkō

== Extenral links ==
- Media related to Relations of Japan and North Korea at Wikimedia Commons
