= Goro Takeda =

Japanese military officer

General Goro Takeda Senior Third Rank
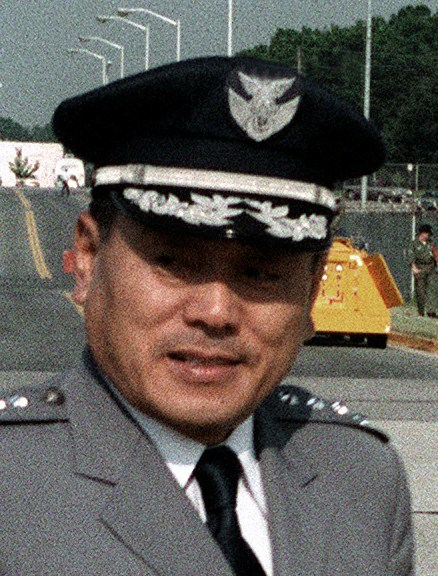
- Takeda in 1980
- Native name: 竹田 五郎
- Born: 24 October 1921; Fukuoka Prefecture, Japan
- Died: 12 February 2020 (aged 98)
- Allegiance: Japan
- Branch: Imperial Japanese Army; National Police Reserve; Japan Air Self-Defense Force
- Service years: 1941-1945 (Imperial Army); 1951-1954 (National Police Reserve); 1954-1981 (JASDF)
- Rank: Captain (Imperial Army); General (JASDF)
- Commands: 2nd "Toppu" Squadron; 1st Squadron; 4th Air Wing; 6th Air Wing; Northern Air Force; General Aviation Corps; Chief of Staff, Air Self-Defense Force; Chairman of the Joint Staff Council
- Awards: Legion of Merit, Officer Degree (1978) Legion of Merit, Commander’s Degree (1980) Order of the Sacred Treasure (1991)

Goro Takeda (竹田 五郎) (24 October 1921 – 12 February 2020) was a Japanese military officer and military commentator who served in the Imperial Japanese Army Air Service during the Second World War reaching the rank of captain. In 1951 Takeda joined the newly formed National Police Reserve staying on when it was reorganized into the paramilitary National Safety Force in 1952 and again in 1954 when the NSF was absorbed into the new Japan Self-Defense Force, with Takeda joining the Air Self-Defense Force (JASDF).

Over the course of his career in the JASDF Takeda held various command and staff positions including Chief of the Air Staff and Chairman of the Joint Staff Council of the Japan Self-Defense Force until his retirement in 1981.

== Biography ==
=== Early years ===
Born in Fukuoka Prefecture on 24 October 1921 Takeda dropped out of Fukuoka Prefectural Shuyukan High School after two years and entered the Hiroshima Army Childhood School, a military boarding school, until his enrollment at the Japanese Imperial Army Officer Preparatory Academy at the age of 18 in 1939.

By 1942 he had graduated from the Imperial Japanese Army Air Academy and then attended Hokota Army Flying School with a focus on light bombers. In September Takeda was assigned to the 90th Flight Squadron, a light bomber unit subordinated to the 13th Air Division posted in China.

In June 1944 he was assigned to the 244th Flight Squadron, which defended the Greater Tokyo Area against the US bombing campaign. While a part of the squadron Takeda flew the Kawasaki Ki-61 and the Kawasaki Ki-100 fighters and was credited with shooting down one B-29 Superfortress. During one night battle Takeda's plane was heavily damaged and he was forced to make an emergency landing at Matsudo Airfield in Chiba Prefecture. Takeda stayed on with the squadron for the rest of the war and eventually commanded the subordinate 2nd "Toppu" Squadron.

=== Post-War ===
Ending the war with the rank of Captain, Takeda was demobilized from the army and returned to his hometown in Fukuoka where he ran a food shop in what would become Heiwadai Stadium.

Takeda joined the newly established National Police Reserve in 1951 with the rank of Senior Inspector, the NPR equivalent to a Major. In 1953 he enrolled in the Security Aviation School, the predecessor of the JASDF Aviation School.

On 14 August 1954 Takeda transferred to the JASDF with the rank of Major. the following year he took part in a pilot training course in the United States and took an Advanced Pilot Training Course in Japan in 1956. In October of that year he was appointed as an instructor in the JASDF 1st Air Wing. In 1958 he was made commander of the 1st Squadron of the 1st Air Wing.

In 1964 he was promoted to Colonel and made commander of the 4th Air Wing. In 1968 he was made Director of the Operations Division in the Air Staff Office. In 1970 he was made the Deputy Commander of the 6th Air Wing before his promotion to Major General and appoint as commander of the unit the following year.

In 1974 Takeda was promoted to Lieutenant General and made commander of the Northern Air Force followed by his appointment as Commander of the General Aviation Corps in 1976 and the Chief of the Air Staff in 1978.

His final assignment starting in 1979 was as Chairman of the Joint Staff Council. In 1981 while chairman an article by Takeda was published in the March issue of the Japanese magazine Jewel, which argued against the view that conscription was against the current Japanese constitution and criticized the policy of caping defense spending at 1% of Japan's GDP. In response the Japan Socialist Party demanded his dismissal at the next House of Representatives Budgetary Committee meeting. The Director-General of the Defense Agency Joji Omura ordered Takeda to be disciplined and he retired later that month on 16 February 1981.

For his service in the JASDF Takeda was awarded the Order of the Sacred Treasure in 1991. He had previously been awarded both the Officers and Commanders degree of Legion of Merit by the United States.

Between 2013 and 2018 Takeda was a regular contributor to the column Viewpoint in the conservative daily newspaper Sekai Nippo writing on various military matters and advocating for a review and amendment of Article 9 of the Japanese Constitution.

Goro Takeda died on 12 February 2020 at the age of 98. He was posthumously awarded the Senior Third Rank of the Japanese court ranks system.

== Awards ==
- Legion of Merit, Officers Degree – 19 October 1978
- Legion of Merit, Commanders Degree – 20 May 1980
- Order of the Sacred Treasure – 3 November 1991
