= Izutsu (disambiguation) =

Izutsu is a classic Noh play written by Zeami

It may also refer to:

== People ==
- Kazuyuki Izutsu (井筒 和幸; born 1952), Japanese film director, screenwriter and film critic
- Kenzo Izutsu (井筒 賢造; born 1941), Japanese former swimmer
- Rikuya Izutsu (井筒 陸也; born 1994), Japanese former footballer
- Shunji Izutsu (井筒 俊司; born 1964), Japanese former military officer
- Toshihiko Izutsu (井筒 俊彦; 1914–1993), Japanese philosopher and religionist

== Places ==
- Izutsu stable, a former sumo wrestling stable
