= Ryuichi Itaya =

Japanese naval officer (1911–1991)

Admiral Ryuichi Itaya Senior Fourth Rank
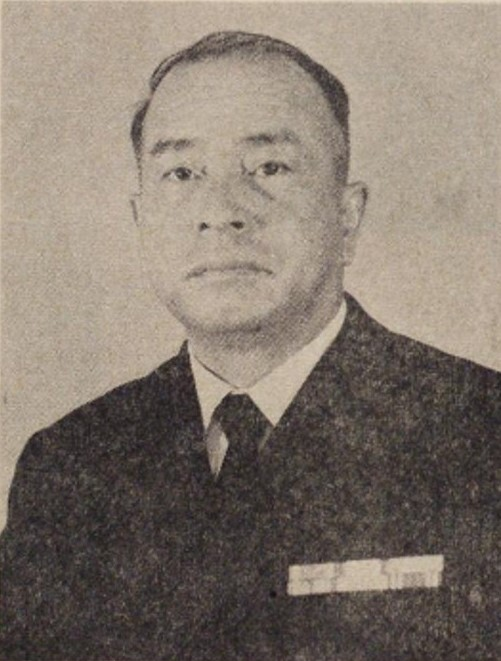
- Itaya in 1967
- Native name: 板谷 隆一
- Born: 20 August 1911; Miyaki District, Saga Prefecture, Japan
- Died: 1 September 1991 (aged 80) Tokyo, Japan
- Allegiance: Japan
- Branch: Imperial Japanese Navy; Japan Coast Guard; Safety Security Force; Japan Maritime Self-Defense Force r
- Service years: 1929–1945 (Imperial Navy); 1952–1954 (Safety Security Force); 1954–1971 (JMSDF)
- Rank: Commander (Imperial Navy); Admiral (JASDF)
- Commands: Escort Flotilla 1; Director of General Affairs, Maritime Staff Office; Fleet Escort Force; Chief of Staff, Maritime Self-Defense Force; Chairman of the Joint Staff Council
- Awards: Legion of Merit, Commander’s Degree (1967) Order of the Sacred Treasure, Second Class (1981)

Admiral Ryuichi Itaya (板谷 隆一, 20 August 1911 – 1 September 1991) was a Japanese naval officer who served in the Imperial Japanese Navy during the Second World War. After a brief stint in the post-war Japanese Coast Guard and Safety Security Force he joined the newly formed Japan Maritime Self-Defense Force (JMSDF) in 1954.

During his service in the JMSDF Itaya held a variety of command and staff positions including serving as the seventh Maritime Chief of Staff from 1966 till his appointment as the fifth Chairman of the Joint Staff Council of the Japan Self-Defense Force, a position he held from 1969 till his retirement in 1971.

== Biography ==
=== Early life and career ===
Itaya was born in Nakahara Village in Miyaki District, Saga Prefecture on 20 August 1911, the second son of a farmer. His older brother was Shigeru Itaya who would also go on to serve in the Japanese Imperial Navy as a naval aviator and squadron commander participating in the Attack on Pearl Harbor and the Battle of Midway until he was killed in action over the northern Kuril Islands as a result of friendly fire on 24 July 1944.

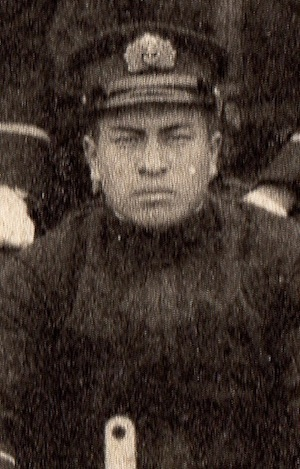
Itaya in 1932

After graduating from the Saga Prefectural Miyaki High School Itaya attended the Imperial Japanese Naval Academy's 60th Class from 1929 to 1932, graduating second in his class. After his graduation he was promoted to ensign and later posted to China to where he served with the Shanghai Special Naval Landing Force. Itaya was promoted to Sub-Lieutenant in 1935 while part of the unit and later reassigned to Destroyer Shimakaze in December 1936. On 11 August 1937 following the Ōyama Incident he was once again assigned to the Shanghai Special Naval Landing Force to replace the fallen 1st Company Commander Lieutenant Isao Ōyama. Itaya arrived at his post in Shanghai on 18 August and for the next three months lead his company in the Battle of Shanghai. Following the battle he was reassigned to the armored cruiser Yakumo in December 1937.

In 1938 Itaya was promoted to lieutenant and attached to the 7th Submarine Squadron where he served as Navigator aboard the submarine I-3 starting in August before being reassaigned to the destroyer Kikuzuki as the ship's weapons officer. The next year he was briefly reassigned as the weapons officer aboard the destroyer Shigure before attending the Naval Gunnery School, after graduating Itaya was assigned as the weapons officer aboard the destroyer Asashio.

=== Pacific War ===
In 1941 Itaya served on the battleship Nagato before being transferred in 1942 to the light cruiser Natori as the ship's weapons officer where he was promoted to lieutenant commander. In early 1943 Itaya was posted to the light cruiser Kinu as weapons officer before being transferred to the 1st Torpedo Squadron where he served as a staff officer. In 1944 he was transferred to the 2nd Torpedo Squadron where he continued to serve as a staff officer.

In April 1945 Itaya participated in Operation Ten-Go posted aboard the light cruiser Yahagi one of the escorts for the battleship Yamato on its final voyage to Okinawa. He survived the Yahagi's sinking during the operation and was among those rescued by the Hatsushimo and Yukikaze. In May he was assigned as a staff officer to the Navy General Command and the staff of the Combined Fleet. In August he was transferred to the Imperial Japanese Navy General Staff and the Navy Ministry. In September Itaya was promoted to commander and was demobilized on 30 November.

=== Post War ===
Starting in December 1945 Itaya served in the Hakata Demobilization Personnel Department of the Second Ministry of Demobilization. He then moved from job to job including working at a car factory and as a doorman at a hotel in Tokyo. In 1952 he joined the Japan Coast Guard with the rank of Second Class Coast Guard Officer, the equivalent of a navy lieutenant commander, where he served as director of the Training Division of the Yokosuka District Supervision Department.

In 1954 Itaya transferred to the newly established Japan Maritime Self-Defense Force with the rank of captain and made chief of Personnel Division in the General Affairs Department of the Maritime Staff Office. In 1956 he was made commander of the Escort Flotilla 1 based in Yokosuka; the following year he attended the JMSDF Staff College in Tokyo and the Naval War College in the United States. In 1958 he graduated from the US Naval War College and was made director of the 1st School Instructor Office at the JMSDF Staff College; the next year he was promoted to director of education at the college in 1959.

In May 1961 Itaya was made vice principal of the JMSDF Staff College until his transfer to Maritime Staff Office where he served as the Deputy Director of the Defense Department and was made rear admiral. In 1963 he was made director of general affairs at the Maritime Staff Office before being made a vice admiral and given command of the Fleet Escort Force.

In 1965 he was appointed Yokosuka District Director General, a post he served in until 30 April 1966 when he was appointed as the 7th Chief of Staff, Maritime Self-Defense Force. On 14 February 1967 during his tenure he was awarded the Commander Degree of the Legion of Merit by the United States. On 1 July 1969 Itaya was made the 5th chairman of the Joint Staff Council, a position he held until his retirement on 1 July 1971.

=== Later life ===
After his retirement Itaya was an advisor to Mitsubishi Heavy Industries and in 1981 was awarded the Order of the Sacred Treasure, Second Class for his service in the JMSDF. Itaya died on 1 September 1991 at the age of 80 in Tokyo and was posthumously awarded the Senior Fourth Rank of the Japanese court ranks system.

== Awards ==
- Legion of Merit, Commanders Degree – 14 February 1967
- Order of the Sacred Treasure, Second Class – 3 November 1981
