= Joint Operations Command (Japan) =

- 統合作戦司令部
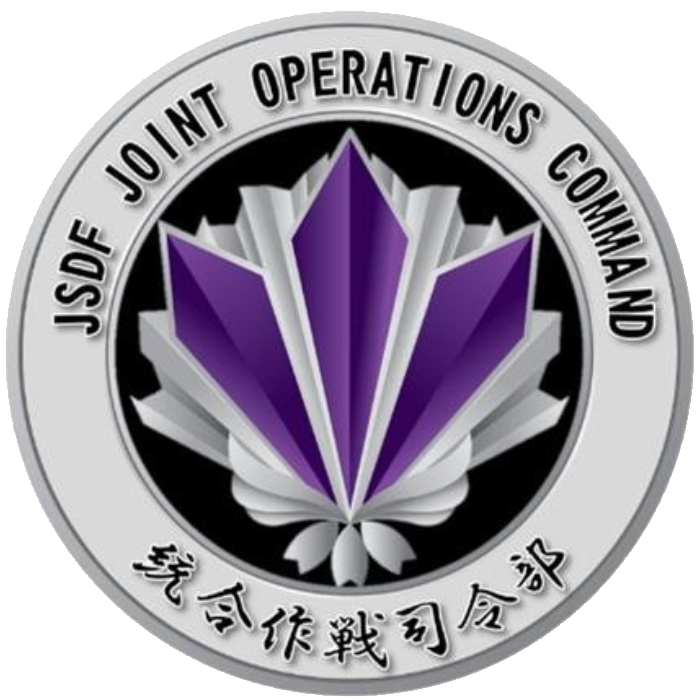
- JJOC logo
- Active: March 24, 2025; 18 months ago
- Country: Japan
- Role: Joint operations
- Size: 240
- Part of: Japanese Ministry of Defense

Commanders
- Commander: Admiral Tateki Tawara (ja)
- Deputy Commander: Lieutenant General Fumio Fujioka

The Joint Operations Command (Japanese: 統合作戦司令部, Hepburn: Tōgōsakusen Shirei-Bu; JJOC) is the Japanese joint operational command that reports to the Japanese Ministry of Defense (JMOD) in Ichigaya, Tokyo. It is in charge of commanding the branches of the Japanese Self-Defense Forces. In addition, the JJOC is in charge of liaising with foreign militaries.

== History ==
The earliest idea of creating a joint operations command in the JSDF started in 2006 when Kazuki Yano of the Maritime Staff Office said that with a Joint Staff Office created, a joint headquarters was needed for a unified system. The JSO was made the de facto joint operational headquarters and plans for a separate joint operations command were not pursued.

Recommendations to establish the JJOC was mentioned as early as 2022 when the Defense Buildup Plan (DBP) paper was released, which called for the suggestion of a creating a joint headquarters to "build a system capable of seamlessly conducting cross-domain operations at all stages from peacetime to contingency, with the aim of strengthening the effectiveness of joint operations among each SDF service". This view was also shared in the National Defense Strategy (NDS) paper. In September 2023, the JMOD announced the creation of a "Permanent Joint Headquarters" for March 2025 with funds requested for fiscal year 2024 under 10.5 billion yen ($71.2 million) to cover the cost of setting it up.

In February 2024, the government approved a bill that would amend the Self-Defense Forces Law (SDF Law) and the Ministry of Defense Establishment Law, which calls for the establishment of a joint operation command. Plans to have it established were made due to concerns of Japan facing military provocation while at the same time, dealing with large-scale disasters. This was based on lessons learned from previous incidents where the command structure was not adequate. In the aftermath of the 2011 Tōhoku earthquake and tsunami, then-Joint Staff Chief Ryoichi Oriki was overwhelmed with multiple duties from commanding the JSDF for disaster relief operations, providing advice to the prime minister and defense minister and liaising with United States Forces Japan (USFJ) forces. This burden was cited in a 2018 Center for Strategic and International Studies report, which stated that the chief of staff works as a chief of defense and combatant commander and recommended having a subordinate commander to take on some of chief of staff's duties for the JSDF to be effective. In February 2024, Chief of Staff Yoshihide Yoshida was admitted to the hospital due to reported claims of being overworked in managing the JSDF response to the 2024 Noto earthquake.

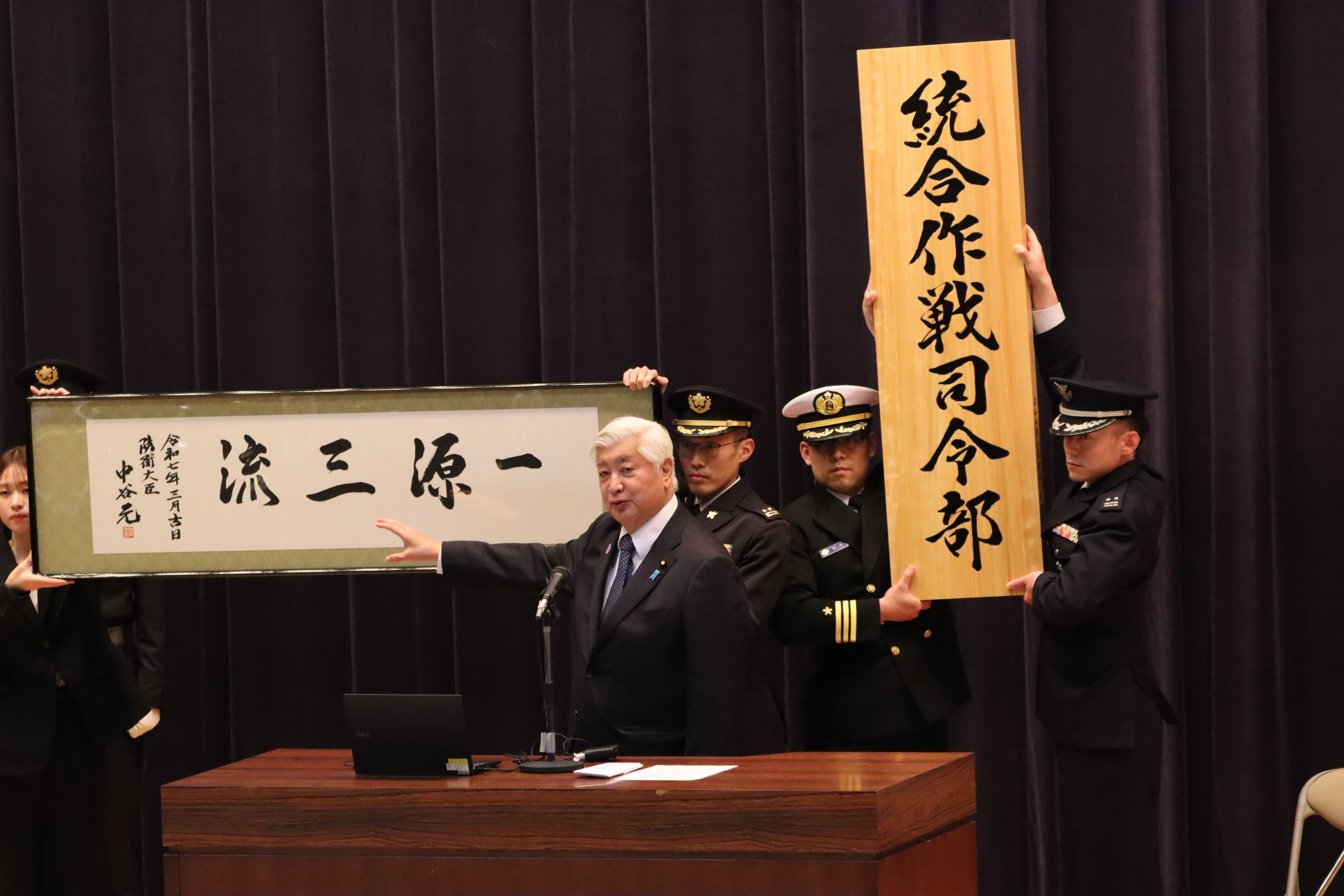
JSDF officers show off a wooden sign of the JJOC during a ceremony to launch the unit.

On March 11, 2025, Lt. Gen. Kenichiro Nagumo of the Japanese Air Self-Defense Force was nominated to be the commander of the JJOC.

A ceremony was held on March 24, 2025, at the JMOD. Lt. Gen. Nagumo was officially appointed as the JJOC's first commander. Vice Admiral Tateki Tawara was appointed as the deputy commander. The unit flag was awarded to Lt. Gen. Nagumo by Defense Minister Gen Nakatani.

In the wake of the JJOC's establishment, concerns were raised that The Pentagon has considered plans to cancel plans to upgrade the command structure of USFJ as part of cutting costs. These plans also raised concerns in Seoul, where it is wary that the same measures can be applied to United States Forces Korea (USFK) forces. The visit by Pete Hegseth to Japan in March 2025 seemed to allay fears when he announced that the USFJ command structure will be changed to a Joint Force Command and welcomed the JJOC's creation to better support US-Japan military ties in times of crisis and ensure Japanese and US forces can adequately defend Japanese territory.

On March 23, 2026, Vice Admiral Tawara was appointed as the second commander of JJOC.

=== Liaison with foreign militaries ===
On September 6, 2025, the Australian government announced that an Australian military officer was assigned to be posted in Tokyo to liaise with the JJOC from September 1. This was the first foreign post made by a foreign country.

== Organization ==
The JJOC commands the three branches of the JSDF and is in charge of commanding units in the Ground Component Command, the Self-Defense Fleet, the Air Defense Command, the Cyber Defense Command, and the Space Operations Group. It is led by a general who has the same rank as the chiefs of staff in the three JSDF branches. It is under the command of the Defense Ministry.

The JJOC serves as the point of contact for the United States Indo-Pacific Command. This allows the Joint Staff Chief to focus on speaking and advising the defense minister and other concerned persons in the government.

The JJOC has a manpower of 240 personnel with further plans to increase it. According to NHK, suggested plans include raising the JJOC's manpower to have 280 personnel.

=== Structure ===
The JJOC is structured according to the following:

- Commander
- Deputy Commander
- Chief of Staff
- Assistant to the Commander-in-Chief of the Joint Operations
- General Affairs officer
- Legal officer
- Command/Communications officer
- Intelligence Department
- Operations Department
- Rear Operations Department
