= Hiroaki Uchikura =

Japanese general (born 1965)

- 内倉 浩昭
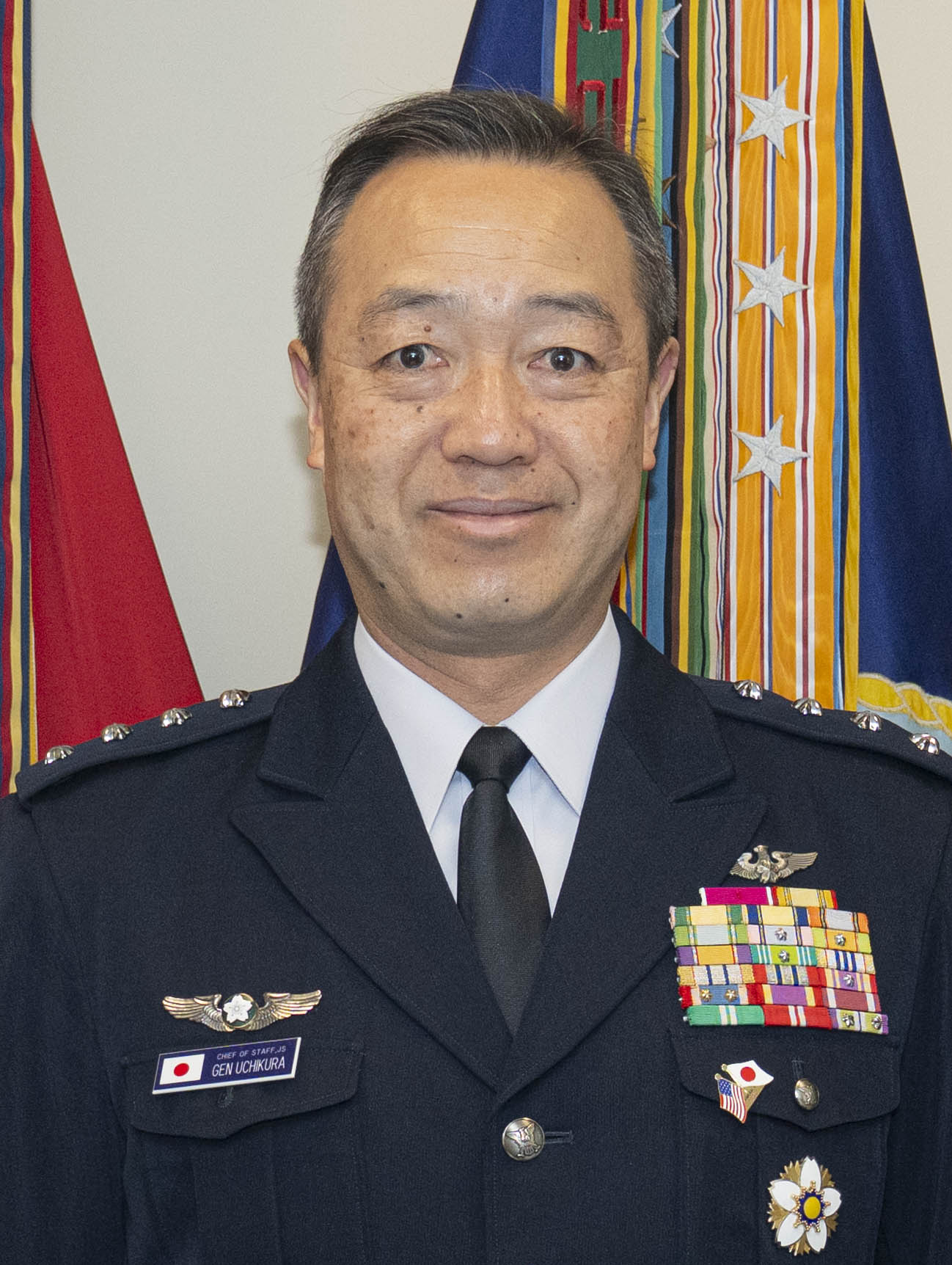
- Hiroaki Uchikura in 2026
- Born: January 11, 1965 (age 61); Tarumizu, Kagoshima, Japan
- Education: National Defense Academy of Japan
- Military career
- Allegiance: Japan
- Branch: Japan Air Self-Defense Force
- Service years: 1987 - Present
- Rank: General
- Commands: Chief of Staff, Joint Staff; Chief of the Air Staff, JASDF; Air Defense Command; Director of the Defense Department, Air Defense Command Headquarters; 5th Air Wing
- Awards: Legionnaire Degree, Legion of Merit; Gold Cross of Honour of the Bundeswehr; Italian Gold Cross of Aeronautic Merit

Hiroaki Uchikura (内倉 浩昭, Uchikura Hiroaki; born January 11, 1965) is a Japanese military general who serves as the incumbent Chief of Staff, Joint Staff of the Japan Self-Defense Forces. General Uchikura previously served as the Chief of the Air Staff of the JASDF, commander of the Air Defense Command, and as wing commander of the 5th Air Wing.

Born and raised from Tarumizu, Kagoshima, Uchikura served into various positions in the Air Self-Defense Force and later served as a fighter pilot flying the Mitsubishi F-15J. Uchikura later served into various administrative and staff positions within the Air Self Defense Force Staff Office and the Ministry of Defense, both being located in Ichigaya, Shinjuku, before being named in major positions such as being the commander of the Air Defense Command and later as the Chief of the Air Staff in March 2023.

== Early life and education ==
Uchikura was born 11 January 1965 at Tarumizu City in Kagoshima Prefecture. Uchikura later completed his high school at the Kanoya High School in Kanoya City and later entered the National Defense Academy of Japan, where he graduated as part of the 31st class in 1987. Uchikura later entered three separate courses at the Air University in Maxwell Air Force Base in Alabama, USA namely the Air Command and Staff College in 1998, the Air War Course in 2008, and the Combined Force Air Component Commander Course in 2015. Uchikura also completed the Joint Advanced Course at the Joint Staff College in 2008.

Uchikura later became a Federal Executive Fellow at the Brookings Institution in Washington, D.C., USA in 2010 and also completed the Generals, Flag officers, and Ambassadors Course at the NATO Defense College in Rome, Italy.

== Military career ==
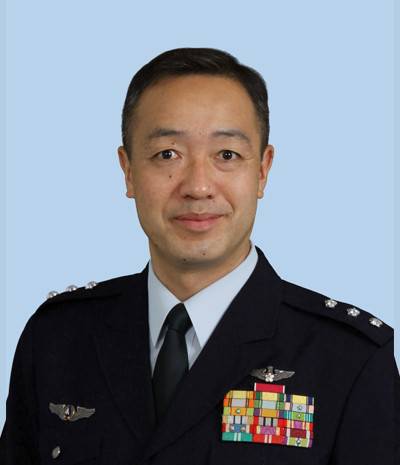
Official portrait of then-Lieutenant General Uchikura as Commander of the Air Defense Command

After his graduation at the National Defense Academy in 1987, Uchikura was later assigned under various units of the Air Self Defense Force, and later served as a fighter pilot flying the Mitsubishi F-15J fighter planes under the 2nd Air Wing in 1990. Uchikura was later assigned under the Operations Department J-3, Joint Staff Council in 1998 and was later placed at the Personnel and Education Department of the Air Staff Office. In July 2001, Uchikura was later promoted into the rank of Lieutenant Colonel, where he served under the Defense Planning and Policy Department and was later assigned under the 6th Fighter Wing in December 2003. In January 2006, Uchikura was promoted to the rank of Colonel and was later assigned at the Defense Department of the Air Staff Office in March 2006 and after a few months served under the Defense Planning and Policy Department at the Air Staff Office. In August 2008, Uchikura was named as Chief of the Defense Division, Defense Department and was later named as the Director of the Defense Division in the Defense Department in July 2010. In July 2012, Uchikura was promoted to the rank of Major General and on 4 December 2012, Uchikura was later named as the wing commander of the 5th Air Wing. On 4 August 2014, Uchikura was named as head of the Defense Plans and Operation Division at the Air Defense Command for one year, and was later named as the deputy director, Defense Plans and Policy Department at the Joint Staff Office on 4 August 2015. Afterwards, Uchikura was named as the Director General for Defense Planning and Policy Department at the Joint Staff Office on 1 July 2016. Uchikura was later named as Director General for Aerial Systems at the Acquisition, Technology & Logistics Agency on 1 August 2018, and was later promoted to the rank of Lieutenant General. After serving his term as the Director General for Aerial Systems, Uchikura was later named as the Vice Chief of the Air Staff of the JASDF on 19 December 2019.

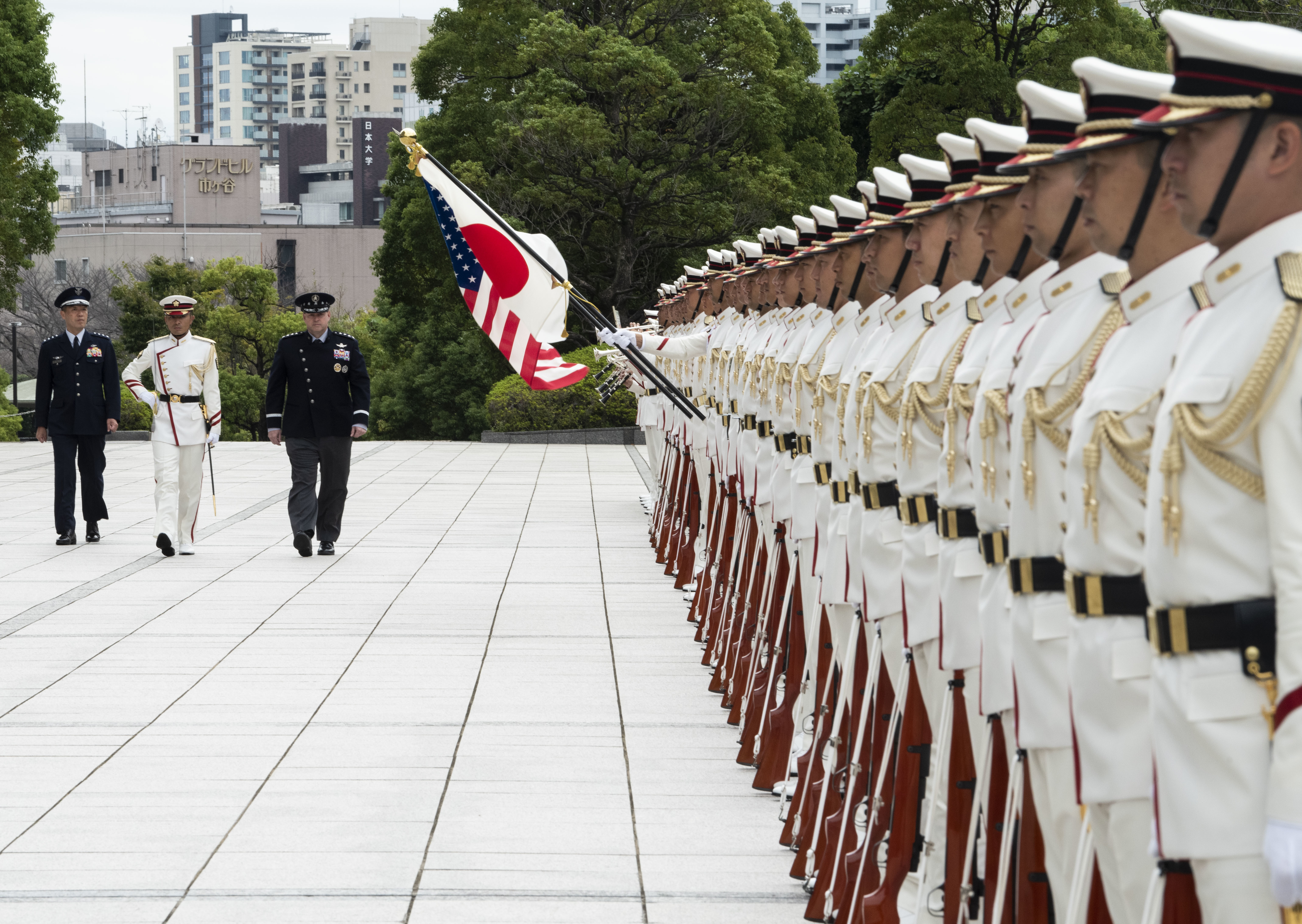
General Uchikura alongside the US Chief of Space Operations General B. Chance Saltzman during the Honor Guard Inspection Ceremony during General Saltzman's visit at the Ministry of Defense (23 September 2023)

Uchikura was named as the commander of the Air Defense Command on 25 August 2020 and replaced then-Lieutenant General Shunji Izutsu, who was named as the Chief of the Air Staff of the JASDF. During his term as the commander of the Air Defense Command, Uchikura boosted the military cooperation, interoperability and collaboration efforts of the JASDF and other regional air forces in the Asia-Pacific Region, such as meeting with the US Pacific Air Forces on his visit at Joint Base Pearl Harbor–Hickam on 3 December 2021. On 30 March 2023, then-Lieutenant General Uchikura eventually succeeded General Shunji Izutsu as the Chief of the Air Staff, JASDF, and was later promoted to the rank of General. During his term as the Chief of the Air Staff, Uchikura continued to boost the importance of cooperation and collaboration of the JASDF to other air forces in the Asia-Pacific Region and beyond, such as his visit to the Allied Air Command at the Ramstein Air Base, Germany on 10 November 2023, where he boosted collaboration activities with NATO air force officials for future operational planning activities in the aftermath of the Russian invasion of Ukraine. On 13 to 14 June 2024, Uchikura serves as the first JASDF official to visit Palau to boost security cooperation activities between Japan and Palau.

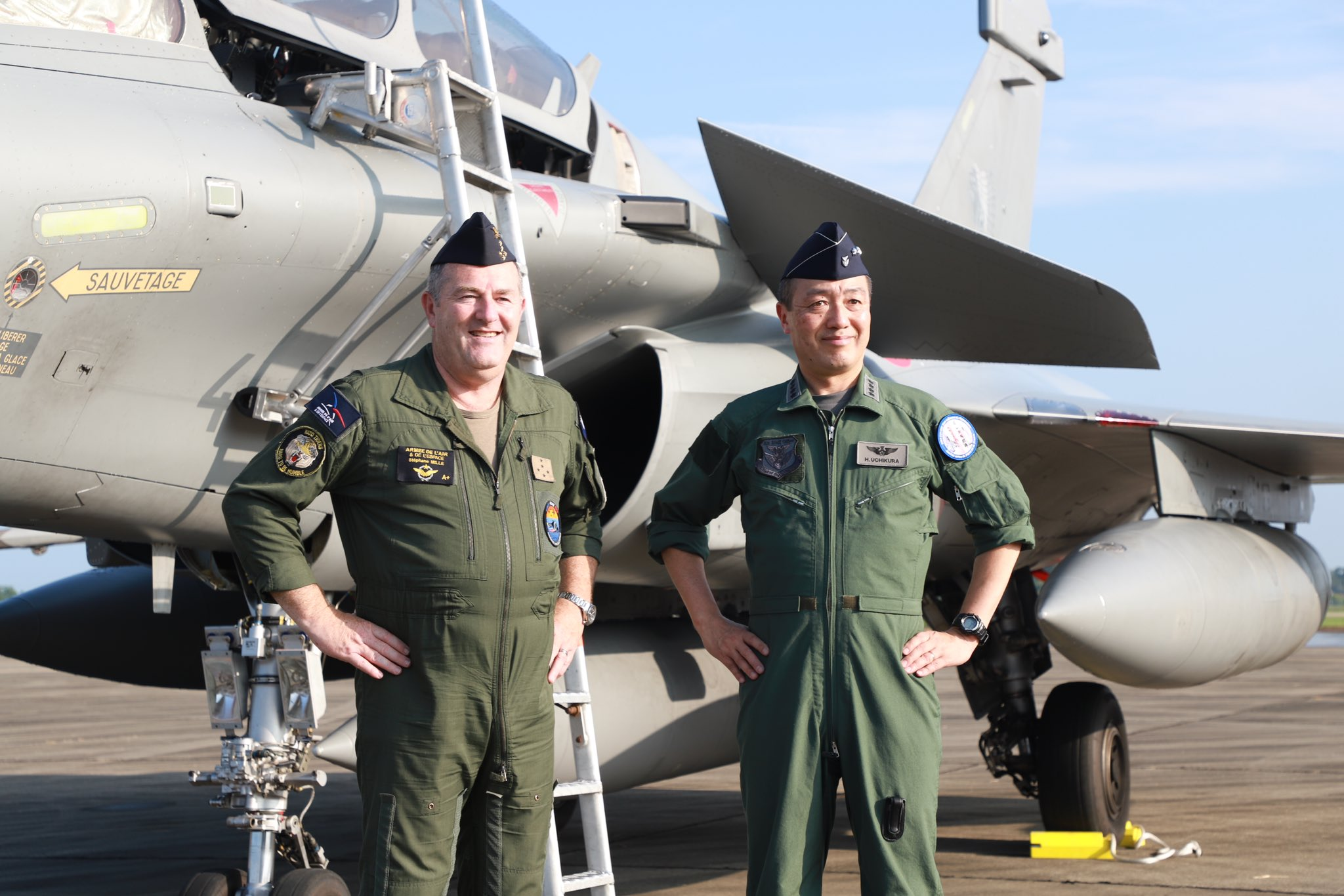
General Uchikura with Chief of Staff of the French Air and Space Force General Stéphane Mille following a flight test on Dassault Rafale on July 26, 2023

On 15 to 23 July 2024, General Uchikura participated on the 2024 Global Air and Space Chiefs’ Conference and attended the Royal International Air Tattoo to boost collaboration and trust between various air forces, such as the attending trilateral meetings between air force chiefs of Japan, UK, and Italy; and between Japan, US, and Australia. On 22 to 25 July 2024, Uchikura oversaw the first Nippon Skies exercise between the German Air Force and the JASDF, and was later awarded the Gold Cross of Honour of the Bundeswehr for his contributions and leadership in enhancing the ties of the German Air Force and the JASDF. On 25 July 2025, General Uchikura also oversaw the bilateral exercises between the JASDF and the French Air and Space Force, and the trilateral exercises between the JASDF, the German Air Force, and the Spanish Air and Space Force. As ASDF Chief Uchikura also oversaw increasing incursions of Chinese military aircraft within the Japan Air Defense Identification Zone in the East China Sea. On 27 to 29 November 2024, General Uchikura made his visit to the Philippines where he boosted collaboration and cooperation efforts between the JASDF and the Armed Forces of the Philippines (AFP) with his meetings with AFP officials such as AFP Chief of Staff General Romeo Brawner Jr., Commanding General of the Philippine Air Force Lieutenant General Stephen Parreño, and other high-ranking officials.

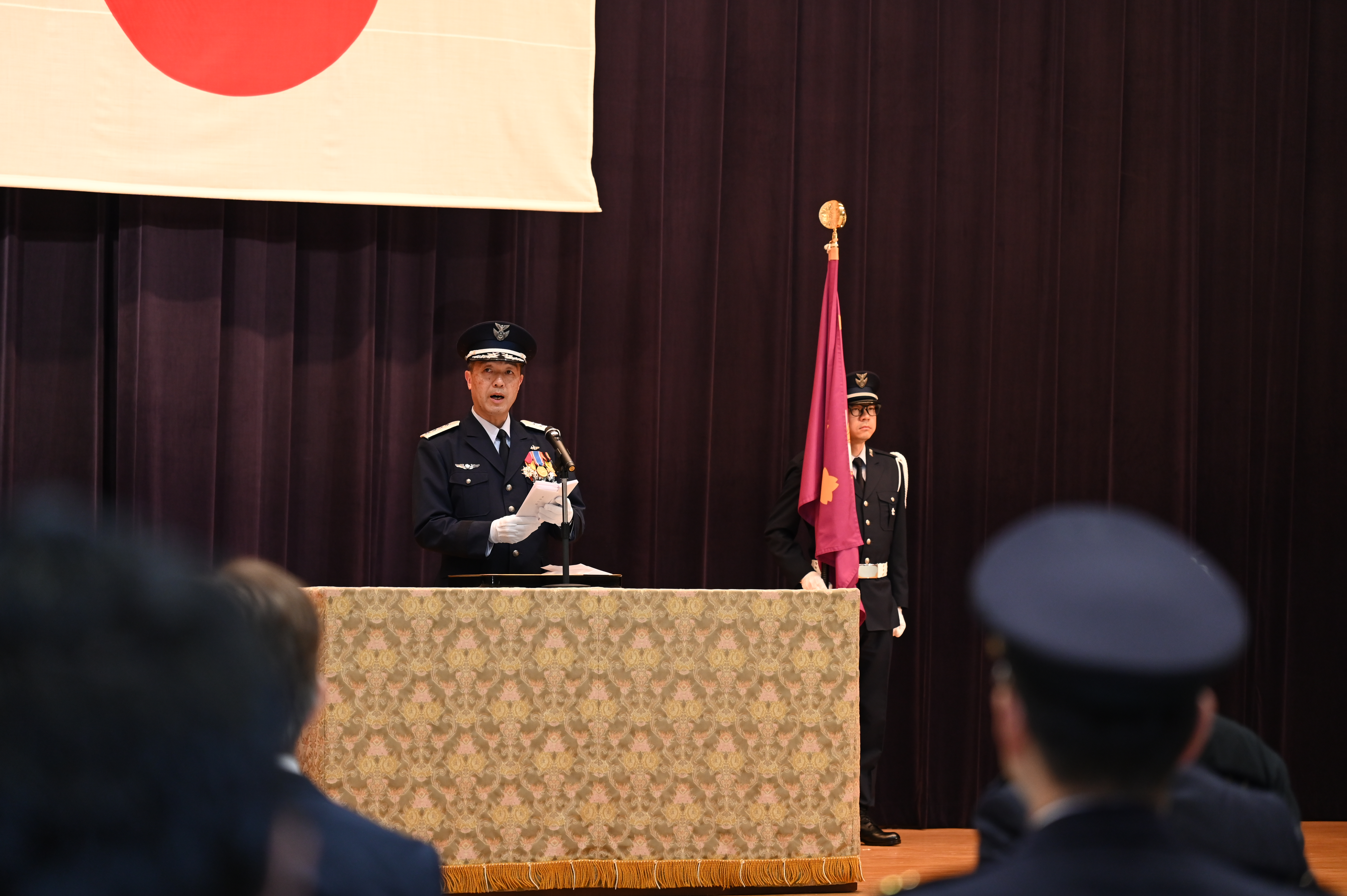
General Uchikura making his assumption speech as Chief of Staff, Joint Staff (1 August 2025)

In the aftermath of a cabinet meeting held on 15 July 2025, General Uchikura was named as the new Chief of Staff, Joint Staff after his predecessor General Yoshihide Yoshida resigned from his post after witnessing the creation and activation of the Joint Operations Command and to give way for a potential successor. Uchikura is later revealed to be the second main contender for the post after former Maritime Self-Defense Force Chief of Staff Admiral Ryō Sakai, who resigned on 19 July 2024 after being charged of misconduct due to Sakai's mishandling of classified information. Uchikura later took his position as the Chief of Staff, Joint Staff on 1 August 2025. During his assumption speech, Uchikura emphasized the importance of accelerate the modernization of the SDF from external and regional threats in a high-risk security environment while continuing to boost the SDF's preparations from natural disasters. Uchikura also emphasized his leadership's five key hashira (pillars) through the five Is in the SDF's operations; namely Integration, which is aimed to strengthen coordination within and beyond the Ministry of Defense in cross-domain capabilities; Interoperability, aimed to boost cooperation between Japan and the U.S.; Inter-connectivity, which targets to strengthen partnerships in security within both the Asia-Pacific and Euro-Atlantic regions; Intensity, which seeks to improve both training and integration of defense and joint response capabilities; and Innovation, which aims to expand the usage of artificial intelligence (AI), unmanned technologies and innovative measures to build both a flexible and efficient defense force.

== Dates of promotion ==
Insignia	Rank	Date
	Second Lieutenant (Santō kūi)	March 1987
	Lieutenant Colonel (Nitō kūsa)	January 2001
	Colonel (Ittō kūsa)	January 2006
	Major General (Kūshō-ho)	July 2012
	Lieutenant General (Kūshō)	1 August 2018
	General (Bakuryōchō-taru-kūshō)	25 August 2020

== Awards from military service ==
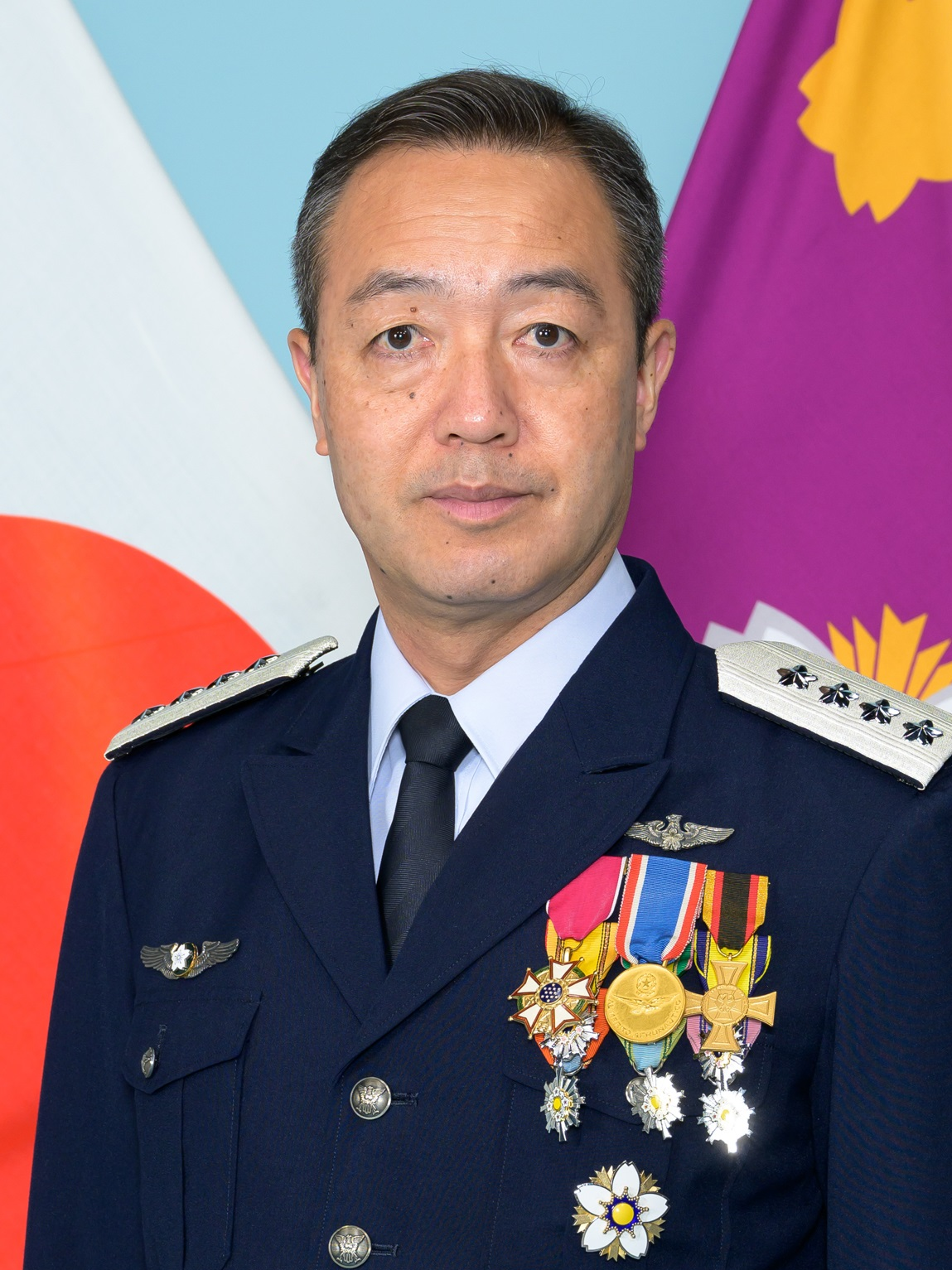
Chief of Staff Hiroaki Uchikura wearing the full size versions of the Self-Defense Force Ribbons and his foreign medals

=== Self-Defense Forces Service Ribbons ===
- 5th Self-Defense Service Ribbon
- 6th Self-Defense Service Ribbon
- 7th Self-Defense Service Ribbon
- 9th Self-Defense Service Ribbon
- 10th Self-Defense Service Ribbon
- 11th Self-Defense Service Ribbon with 1 silver cherry blossom
- 13th Self-Defense Service Ribbon
- 15th Self-Defense Service Ribbon
- 18th Self-Defense Service Ribbon with 1 silver cherry blossom
- 19th Self-Defense Service Ribbon
- 20th Self-Defense Service Ribbon
- 22nd Self-Defense Service Ribbon
- 24th Self-Defense Service Ribbon
- 25th Self-Defense Service Ribbon
- 26th Self-Defense Service Ribbon with 2 silver cherry blossoms
- 27th Self-Defense Service Ribbon
- 32nd Defensive Memorial Cordon
- 33rd Defensive Memorial Cordon
- 36th Self-Defense Service Ribbon with 1 silver cherry blossom

=== Foreign medals ===
- Legionnaire, US Legion of Merit
- Gold Cross of Honour of the Bundeswehr (awarded on 25 July 2024)
- Italian Gold Cross of Aeronautic Merit

== Personal life ==
Uchikura is married to Shihomi Uchikura, and they have 2 children. His interests include playing and watching football.

Military offices
Preceded by Yoshihide Yoshida	Chief of Staff of the Joint Staff; Japan Self-Defense Forces; 2025–present	Incumbent
Preceded by Shunji Izutsu	Chief of Staff; Japan Air Self-Defense Force; 2023–2025	Succeeded by Takehiro Morita
