= Sugie Ichizo =

Japanese naval officer (1908–1999)

Admiral Sugie Ichizo Senior Third Rank
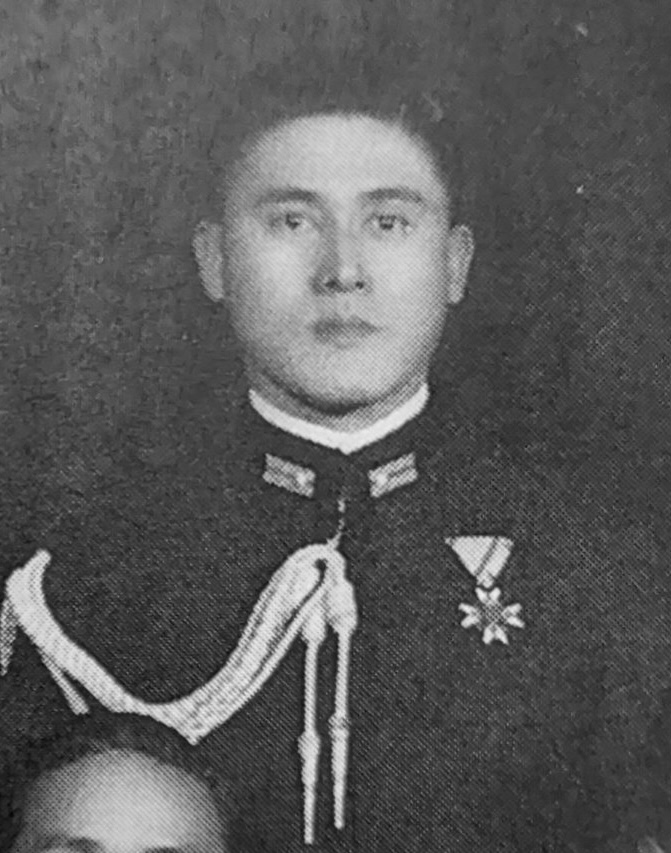
- Native name: 杉江 一三
- Born: 18 September 1908; Aichi Prefecture, Japan
- Died: 27 July 1999 (aged 90) Yokosuka, Japan
- Allegiance: Japan
- Branch: Imperial Japanese Navy; Safety Security Force; Japan Maritime Self-Defense Force
- Service years: 1928-1945 (Imperial Navy); 1953-1954 (Safety Security Force); 1954-1966 (Maritime Self-Defense Force)
- Rank: Commander (Imperial Navy); Admiral (JMSDF)
- Commands: Escort Flotilla 1 Commander in Chief, Self Defense Fleet; Chief of the Maritime Staff; Chairman of the Joint Staff Council
- Awards: Order of the Sacred Treasure, Second Class (1978)

Admiral Sugie Ichizo (杉江 一三, Ichizo Sugie; 18 September 1908 – 27 July 1999) was a Japanese naval officer who served in both the Imperial Japanese Navy and the post-war Japan Maritime Self-Defense Force (JMSDF).

A staff officer during the Second World War Ichizo joined the post-war Coastal Security Force in 1953 before transferring to the JMSDF the following year where he most notably served as the second Chairman of Joint Staff Council of the Japan Self-Defense Force, from 1964 until his retirement in 1966.

== Biography ==
=== Early career ===
Born in Aichi Prefecture on 18 September 1908 Ichizo attended Aichi Prefectural Atsudan High School before entering the Imperial Japanese Naval Academy at the age of 16 in 1925. He graduated in 1928, and was appointed as an Ensign the following year.

In the 1930s, Ichizo held a variety of positions including serving as an officer on two destroyers, the Yūdachi and the Yamakaze, as well as a position as a staff officer in the Training Fleet.

In 1938, Ichizo entered the Japanese Naval War College, after graduating in 1940 he was assigned to the armored cruiser Tokiwa.

=== Pacific War ===
By the start of the war in the Pacific Ichizo had reached the rank of Lieutenant Commander. In 1943 he was appointed as a staff officer in the Southwest Area Fleet before becoming the Deputy Chief of Staff of the Thirteenth Air Fleet on 20 September.

On 1 May 1944 Ichizo was promoted to the rank of Commander and starting in September served in the Navy Ministry.

In 1945, after briefly serving as a staff officer in the Imperial Navy General Staff, Ichizo was appointed in July as the vice chief of staff of a unit subordinate to the 1st Special Attack Squadron which operated Kairyu midget submarines alongside Kaiten human torpedoes and Shinyo suicide motorboats expected to be used in the defense of the home islands in the expected upcoming US invasion.

After the Japanese surrender, Ichizo continued serving in the Navy Ministry until he was demobilized on 29 November 1945.

=== Post-war career ===
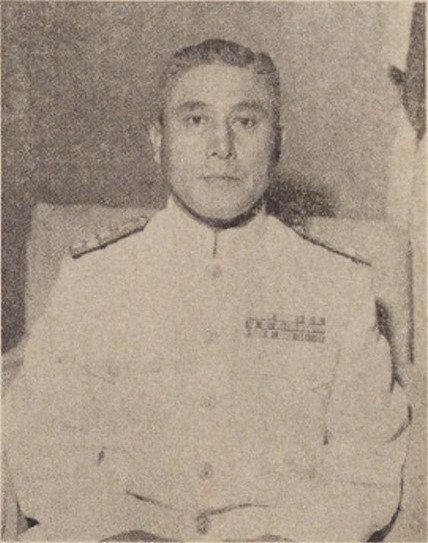
Ichizo as a JMSDF Admiral in 1965

After a stint as a dairy farmer Ichizo joined the newly established Safety Security Force, a maritime patrol force and predecessor to the Japan Maritime Self-Defense Force, with the rank of Superintendent First Class, the equivalent to a navy Captain.

When the JMSDF was established in 1954 Ichizo transferred and first served as a staff officer in the Maritime Staff Office until he was appointed Deputy of the Yokosuka Naval District in 1956.

In 1957 Ichizo was appointed Chief of Staff of Escort Flotilla 1 and promoted to Rear Admiral. In 1959 he was appointed as commander of the flotilla a position he held until his appointment as Inspector of the Maizuru Naval District in 1961.

In 1961 Ichizo was promoted to Vice Admiral and made Commander in Chief, Self Defense Fleet before being appointed as fifth Chief of the Maritime Staff in 1963 during the implementation of the Second Defense Build-up Plan which aimed to modernize and enhance the capabilities of the JSDF.

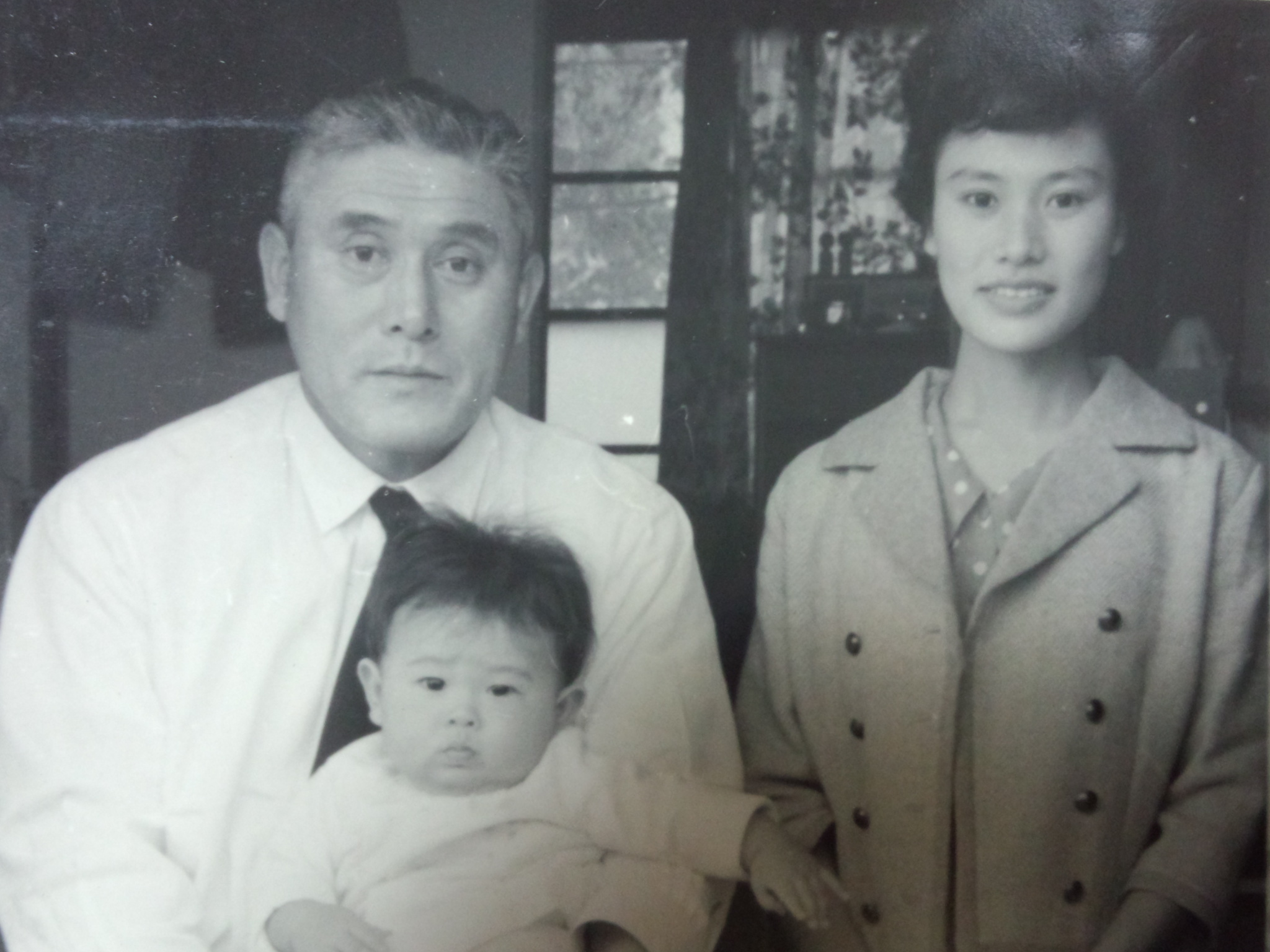
Ichizo with his daughter in the summer of 1964

Ichizo ended his career with his appointment as Chairman of the Joint Staff Council from 1963 until his retirement in 1966. In 1964 during his time as Chairman he suggested that the JMSDF acquire a nuclear-powered submarine which caused the Japan Socialist Party to demand his dismissal on the basis that his proposal violated the Atomic Energy Basic Law.

=== Later life and death ===
After his retirement Ichizo worked as a Maruzen Petroleum consultant and became the President of Nippon Hydrographics Co., Ltd. On 3 November 1978 Ichizo was awarded the Order of the Sacred Treasure, Second Class for his service in the JMSDF.

Sugie Ichizo died at Kinugasa Hospital in Yokosuka City due to complications from pneumonia at the age of 90 on 27 July 1999. He was posthumously awarded the Senior Third Rank of the Japanese court ranks system.

== Awards ==
- Order of the Sacred Treasure, Second Class - 3 November 1978
