= Yuji Fujinawa =

Japanese general

- 藤縄 祐爾

Chief of Staff, Joint Staff
- In office March 31, 1999 – March 27, 2001
- Prime Minister: Keizo Obuchi; Yoshiro Mori
- Preceded by: Kazuya Natsukawa
- Succeeded by: Shoji Takegouchi

Chief of the Ground Staff
- In office July 1, 1997 – March 30, 1999
- Prime Minister: Ryutaro Hashimoto; Keizo Obuchi
- Preceded by: Nobutoshi Watanabebe
- Succeeded by: Tsuneo Isoshima

Personal details
- Born: September 22, 1941 (age 85) Hyogo, Japan
- Education: National Defense Academy of Japan

Military service
- Allegiance: Japan
- Branch/service: Japan Ground Self-Defense Force
- Years of service: 1964–2001
- Rank: General
- Commands: Chief of Staff, Joint Staff; Chief of the Ground Staff, JGSDF; Eastern Army; Vice Chief of Staff, Ground Staff, JGSDF; 7th Division

General Yuji Fujinawa (藤縄 祐爾, Fujinawa Yūji; born 22 September 1941) is a retired Japanese general who served in the Japan Self-Defense Forces. A lifelong career military officer, he began as an infantry officer. He was named Chief-of-Staff of the Japan Ground Self-Defense Force in July 1997, and became Chairman of the Joint Staff Council in March 1999, his term ending in March 2001.

Military offices
Preceded by Nobutoshi Watanabe	Chief of Staff; Japan Ground Self-Defense Force; 1997-1999	Succeeded by Tsuneo Isojima
