= Chief of Staff, Joint Staff =

Highest-ranking and senior-most officer of the Japan Self-Defense Forces (JSDF)

- 統合幕僚長
- Standard of the Chief of Staff, Joint Staff

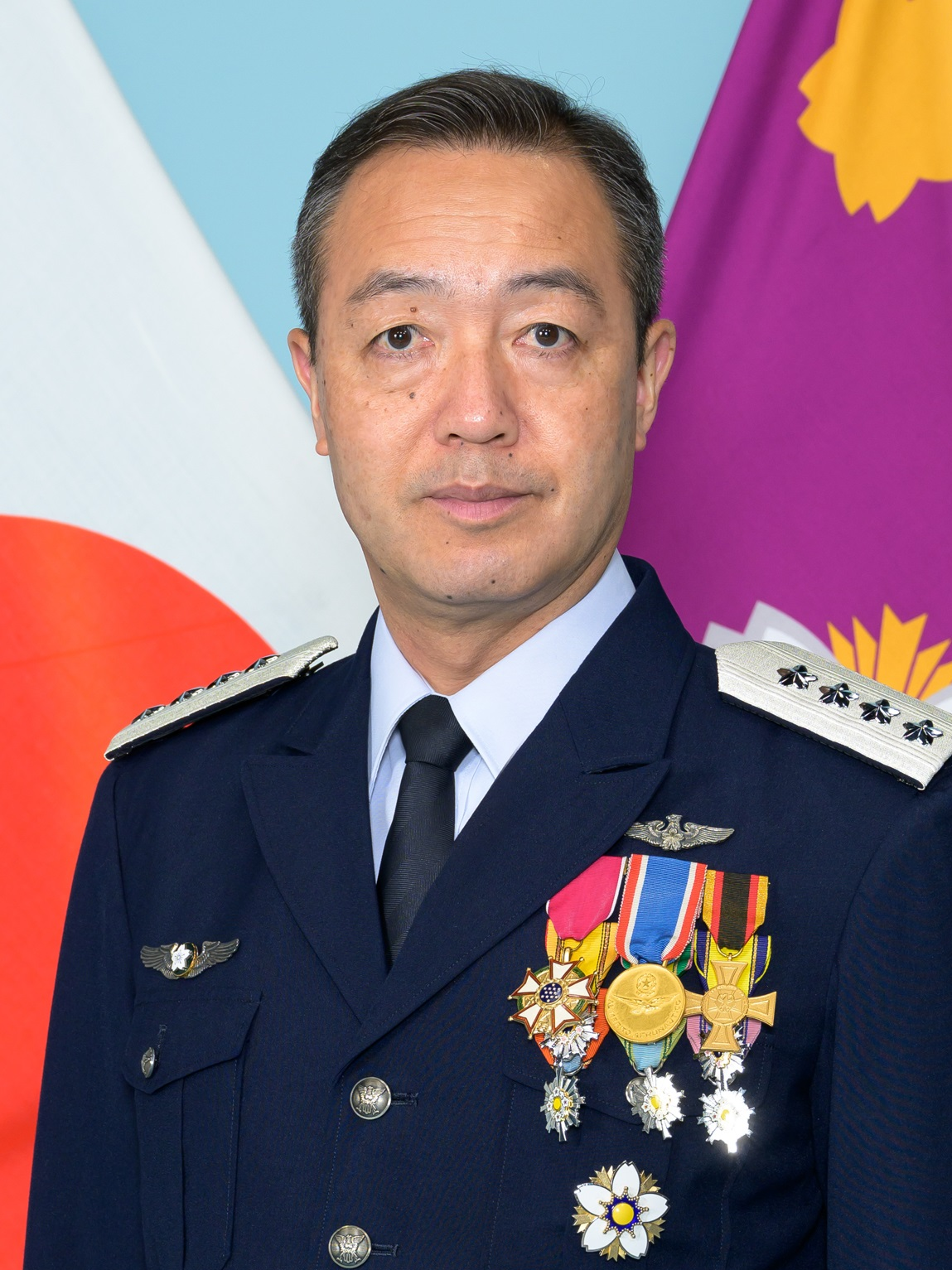
- Incumbent; General Hiroaki Uchikura since 1 August 2025
- Japan Self-Defense Forces
- Member of: Joint Staff; Defense Council
- Reports to: Minister of Defense
- Seat: Ministry of Defense Headquarters, Ichigaya, Shinjuku, Tokyo, Japan
- Appointer: Minister of Defense; Subject to formal approval by the Cabinet
- Term length: Mandatory retirement age at 62
- Precursor: Chairman of the Joint Staff Council
- Formation: 1 July 1954
- First holder: Lieutenant General Keizō Hayashi (as Chairman of the Joint Staff Council); General Hajime Massaki (as Chief of Staff, Joint Staff)
- Deputy: Vice Chief of Staff, Joint Staff

The Chief of Staff, Joint Staff (Japanese: 統合幕僚長, Hepburn: Tōgō Bakuryō-chō), formerly known as the Chairman of the Joint Staff Council from 1954 to 2006, is the highest-ranking military officer in the Japan Self-Defense Forces (JSDF). The Chief of Staff, Joint Staff oversees overall military authority and staff functions through the Joint Staff Office over the JSDF and its three service branches: the Japan Ground Self-Defense Force, the Japan Maritime Self-Defense Force, and the Japan Air Self-Defense Force, while operational command is currently exercised by the Commander of the Joint Operations Command. The Chief of Staff, Joint Staff is primarily held by rank of a four-star rank of General or Admiral, the highest rank in the Japan Self-Defense Force. The Chief of Staff, Joint Staff is selected from among the Chief of Staff, Ground Self-Defense Force; the Chief of Staff, Maritime Self-Defense Force; and the Chief of Staff, Air Self-Defense Force.

Following the creation of the Joint Operations Command in 2025, the Chief of Staff, Joint Staff serves as the primary coordinator to the Minister of Defense and the Commander of the Joint Operations Command, who exercises central operational control of JSDF services assigned in joint operations. The Chief of Staff, Joint Staff oversees, synchronizes, and advices all JSDF services and commands in national defense, primarily on defense coordination and defense preparedness and transmits commands from the Ministry of Defense. The Chief of Staff, Joint Staff also currently serves as the senior military adviser to the Minister of Defense concerning JSDF operations, and provide military advice on the formation of defense postures and strategies, policy implementations, operational planning, and military doctrines and executes orders of the Minister of Defense with directions from the Prime Minister, who serves as the Commander-in-chief of the JSDF.

== Structure and responsibilities ==
=== Chairman of the Joint Staff Council (1954 to 2006) ===
The precursor of the Chief of Staff, Joint Staff is the Chairman of the Joint Staff Council. The Chairman of the Joint Staff Council served as the overall professional head of the Japan Self Defense Forces (SDF), though the Chairman's position was only limited to both advising the Minister of Defense in defense matters and coordinating the three service branches of the SDF, which translates to the Chairman having no full command authority over to the Chiefs of the Ground Self Defense Force (GSDF), the Maritime Self Defense Force (MSDF), and the Air Self Defense Forces (ASDF), unless two or more branches were integrated into a single organization. The chiefs of the three branches also coordinate separately with the Minister of Defense.

Meanwhile, the Chairman's main council, known as the Joint Staff Council, provides joint coordination matters whenever necessary. The former organization's limits could pose problems in terms of launching joint operations across different service branches during wartime, despite being capable to coordinate forces for disaster relief missions and international peacekeeping operations. This prompted the SDF to abolish the position of the Chairman of the Joint Staff Council on 26 March 2006 and led to the creation of the position of Chief of Staff, Joint Staff on 27 March 2006, with General Hajime Massaki serving as the first officeholder for the position, allowing the Chief of Staff, Joint Staff to better handle military operations while having both the command and powers to coordinate and delegate all SDF service branches, improve joint ballistic missile defense capabilities, and further enhance humanitarian missions.

=== Chief of Staff, Joint Staff (2006 to present) ===
The Chief of Staff, Joint Staff, is the head of the Joint Staff (統合幕僚監部, Tōgō Bakuryō Kanbu), which consists of the Vice Chief of Staff, Joint Staff, the Senior Enlisted Advisor to the Chief of Staff, Joint Staff, the Administrative Vice Chief of Staff, as well as the Joint Staff's five departments and three special staff offices. The Vice Chief of Staff, Joint Staff serves as the Chief of Staff, Joint Staff's primary assistant in overall national defense coordination while the Administrative Vice Chief of Staff assists the Chief of Staff, Joint Staff in administrative matters. The Joint Staff's five departments are the General Affairs Department, Operations Department, Defense Plans and Policy Department, C4 Systems Department and the Logistics Department, while the three special staff are the Joint Staff Councilor, Public Affairs, and the Legal Affairs General.

The Chief of Staff, Joint Staff supervises the service branches operations of the Japan Self-Defense Forces, and their powers are focused on coordinating the Minister of Defense's commands and advising the Minister of Defense in matters relating to the Self Defense Forces. In wartime, the Chief of Staff, Joint Staff still retains their post as the highest-ranking commander and will also be responsible for advising the Minister of Defense while directing the commander of the Joint Operations Command to prepare and utilize all SDF units to execute potential military operations through a centralized joint operations network under the entire command of the Prime Minister, which gives all JSDF the necessary services to create effective military strategies for self defense operations. The chain of operational authority runs from the Chief of Staff, Joint Staff to the commander of the Joint Operations Command, and eventually to commanders of the several Operational Commands. Each service branch is headed by its respective chief of staff, who has administrative control over its own services.

=== Establishment of the Joint Operations Command ===
Prior to the changes made on March 2025, the Chief of Staff, Joint Staff combined the duties of being the principal advisor to the Minister of Defense and the Prime Minister, while having full operational authority in the Japan Self Defense Forces and as a coordinator to both the US Chairman of the Joint Chiefs of Staff and the United States Indo-Pacific Command. The concentration of responsibilities became apparent as the Chief of Staff, Joint Staff's responsibilities could be overloaded in managing multiple tasks all at once and observed during the aftermath of the 2011 Tōhoku earthquake and tsunami, where former Chief of Staff, Joint Staff General Ryoichi Oriki was overwhelmed in dealing with multiple duties in commanding the JSDF in disaster relief operations, advising former Prime Minister Naoto Kan and defense minister Toshimi Kitazawa. and coordinating with the United States Forces Japan in assisting in humanitarian operations. In an evaluation document by the Japanese Government named "Lessons Learned Regarding the Response to the Great East Japan Earthquake (Final Summary)", the paper stated that while the Chief of Staff of the Joint Staff can balance assisting the Minister of Defense with commanding troops, functional changes were made following the increased workload of the Joint Staff Office, while the Deputy Director of Operations was established to further boost operational coordination between the JSDF forces. The concentration of responsibilities was renewed during the 2024 Noto earthquake, as former Chief of Staff, Joint Staff General Yoshihide Yoshida was hospitalized due to overwork in dealing with multiple responsibilities under his position. A report from the Center for Strategic and International Studies in 2018 stated that the Chief of Staff, Joint Staff works multiple roles as a chief of the JSDF and as a combatant commander, and recommended having a subordinate commander to take on selected duties of the Chief of Staff, Joint Staff, in order for the JSDF to be effective. The JSDF also formerly established a temporary joint task force for particular missions, yet a permanent headquarters with centralized command for the three major services was not created to cater a variety of joint operations.

The establishment of the Joint Operations Command was approved on 16 December 2022 as the Defense Buildup Plan (DBP) paper was released in order to create a joint operations headquarters, and the development was eventually supported in the National Defense Strategy (NDS) paper. The planned bill for the amendment of the Self Defense Law and the Ministry of Defense Establishment Law was approved, allowing the creation of a permanent joint operations command capable of having a central chain of command operating in cross-domain operations. This led to the creation of the Joint Operations Command on 24 March 2025. The establishment of the Joint Operations Command separates the Joint Staff's military staff and advisory functions to the central military command, allowing the Chief of Staff, Joint Staff to focus his responsibilities on advising military matters and directions to the Minister of Defense and the Prime Minister while transmitting the Defense Minister's commands to the Commander of the Joint Operations Command, while the Joint Operations Command serves as the centralized operational command on managing joint operations.

== Retirement and conferment of decoration ==
The mandatory retirement age for generals who were appointed as the Chief of Staff, Joint Staff is 62 years. Under these circumstances, the prime minister, under the guidance of the Ministry of Defense, has the power appoint a new Chief of Staff, Joint Staff within the Joint Staff council or extend the term of the Chief of Staff, Joint Staff at their pleasure. Upon reaching the age of 70, under Japan's honours system, the former Chiefs of Staff, Joint Staff are to be awarded the Order of the Sacred Treasure, 1st class. The creation of upgrading the level of the order from Order of the Sacred Treasure, 2nd class to Order of the Sacred Treasure, 1st class, was made by Shinzo Abe in 2015, which serves as a measure to recognize the former Chiefs of Staff, Joint Staff efforts in their service to the JSDF.

== List of officeholders ==
The current Chief of Staff, Joint Staff is General Hiroaki Uchikura, who took office on August 1, 2025.

=== Chairman of the Joint Staff Council ===
No.	Portrait	Chairman of the Joint Staff Council	Took office	Left office	Time in office	Defence branch
1	Keizō Hayashi林 敬三	Lieutenant General; Keizō Hayashi 林 敬三 (1907–1991)	1 July 1954	13 August 1964	10 years, 43 days	Japan Ground Self-Defense Force
2	Sugie Ichizo杉江一三	Admiral; Sugie Ichizo 杉江一三 (1908–1999)	14 August 1964	29 April 1966	1 year, 258 days	Japan Maritime Self-Defense Force
3	Amano Yoshihide [ja]天野良英	General; Amano Yoshihide 天野良英 (1910–2001)	30 April 1966	14 November 1967	1 year, 198 days	Japan Ground Self-Defense Force
4	Hirokuni Muta [ja]牟田弘國	General; Hirokuni Muta 牟田弘國 (1910–1987)	15 November 1967	30 June 1969	1 year, 227 days	Japan Air Self-Defense Force
5	Ryuichi Itaya板谷隆一	Admiral; Ryuichi Itaya 板谷隆一 (1911–1991)	1 June 1969	31 May 1971	1 year, 364 days	Japan Maritime Self-Defense Force
6	Hayao Kinugasa衣笠駿雄	General; Hayao Kinugasa 衣笠駿雄 (1915–2007)	1 June 1971	31 January 1973	1 year, 214 days	Japan Ground Self-Defense Force
7	Ryuhei Nakamura [ja]中村龍平	General; Ryuhei Nakamura 中村龍平 (1916–2008)	1 February 1973	30 June 1974	1 year, 149 days	Japan Ground Self-Defense Force
8	Motoharu Shirakawa [ja]白川元春	General; Motoharu Shirakawa 白川元春 (1918–2008)	1 July 1974	15 March 1976	1 year, 258 days	Japan Air Self-Defense Force
9	Hirokazu Samejima [ja]鮫島博一	Admiral; Hirokazu Samejima 鮫島博一 (1918–2000)	16 March 1976	19 October 1977	1 year, 217 days	Japan Maritime Self-Defense Force
10	Hiroomi Kurisu [ja]栗栖弘臣	General; Hiroomi Kurisu 栗栖弘臣 (1920–2004)	20 October 1977	27 July 1978	280 days	Japan Ground Self-Defense Force
11	Takehiko Takae [ja]高品武彦	General; Takehiko Takae 高品武彦 (1922–2014)	27 July 1978	31 July 1979	1 year, 4 days	Japan Ground Self-Defense Force
12	Goro Takeda竹田五郎	General; Goro Takeda 竹田五郎 (1921–2020)	1 August 1979	15 February 1981	1 year, 198 days	Japan Air Self-Defense Force
13	Tsugio Yada [ja]矢田次夫	Admiral; Tsugio Yada 矢田次夫 (1923–2012)	16 February 1981	15 March 1983	2 years, 27 days	Japan Maritime Self-Defense Force
14	Sumio Murai [ja]村井澄夫	General; Sumio Murai 村井澄夫 (born 1925)	16 March 1983	30 June 1984	1 year, 106 days	Japan Ground Self-Defense Force
15	Keitaro Watanabe [ja]渡部敬太郎	General; Keitaro Watanabe 渡部敬太郎 (1927–1997)	1 July 1984	5 February 1986	1 year, 219 days	Japan Ground Self-Defense Force
16	Shigehiro Mori (general) [ja]森繁弘	General; Shigehiro Mori (general) 森繁弘 (born 1928)	6 February 1986	10 December 1987	1 year, 307 days	Japan Air Self-Defense Force
17	Masao Ishii [ja]石井政雄	General; Masao Ishii 石井政雄 (1931–2007)	11 December 1987	15 March 1990	2 years, 94 days	Japan Ground Self-Defense Force
18	Taizo Terashima [ja]寺島泰三	General; Taizo Terashima 寺島泰三 (born 1933)	16 March 1990	30 June 1991	1 year, 106 days	Japan Ground Self-Defense Force
19	Hajime Sakuma [ja]佐久間一	Admiral; Hajime Sakuma 佐久間一 (1935–2014)	1 July 1991	30 June 1993	1 year, 364 days	Japan Maritime Self-Defense Force
20	Tetsuya Nishimoto [ja]西元徹也	General; Tetsuya Nishimoto 西元徹也 (1936–2024)	1 July 1993	24 March 1996	2 years, 267 days	Japan Ground Self-Defense Force
21	Shigeru Sugiyama [ja]杉山蕃	General; Shigeru Sugiyama 杉山蕃 (born 1938)	25 March 1996	12 October 1997	1 year, 201 days	Japan Air Self-Defense Force
22	Kazuya Natsukawa [ja]夏川和也	Admiral; Kazuya Natsukawa 夏川和也 (born 1940)	13 October 1997	30 March 1999	1 year, 168 days	Japan Maritime Self-Defense Force
23	Yuji Fujinawa藤縄祐爾	General; Yuji Fujinawa 藤縄祐爾 (born 1941)	31 March 1999	26 March 2001	1 year, 360 days	Japan Ground Self-Defense Force
24	Shoji Takegochi [ja]竹河内捷次	General; Shoji Takegochi 竹河内捷次 (born 1943)	27 March 2001	27 January 2003	1 year, 306 days	Japan Air Self-Defense Force
25	Toru Ishikawa [ja]石川亨	Admiral; Toru Ishikawa 石川亨 (born 1944)	28 January 2003	29 August 2004	1 year, 214 days	Japan Maritime Self-Defense Force
26	Hajime Massaki [ja]先崎一	General; Hajime Massaki 先崎一 (born 1944)	30 August 2004	26 March 2006	1 year, 208 days	Japan Ground Self-Defense Force

=== Chief of Staff, Joint Staff ===
No.	Portrait	Chief of Staff, Joint Staff	Took office	Left office	Time in office	Defence branch
26	Hajime Massaki [ja]先崎 一	General; Hajime Massaki 先崎 一 (born 1944)	27 March 2006	3 August 2006	129 days	Japan Ground Self-Defense Force
27	Takashi Saito (admiral) [ja]齋藤 隆	Admiral; Takashi Saito (admiral) 齋藤 隆 (born 1948)	4 August 2006	23 March 2009	2 years, 231 days	Japan Maritime Self-Defense Force
28	Ryoichi Oriki [ja]折木 良一	General; Ryoichi Oriki 折木 良一 (born 1950)	24 March 2009	30 January 2012	2 years, 312 days	Japan Ground Self-Defense Force
29	Shigeru Iwasaki岩崎茂	General; Shigeru Iwasaki 岩崎茂 (born 1953)	31 January 2012	13 October 2014	2 years, 255 days	Japan Air Self-Defense Force
30	Katsutoshi Kawano河野 克俊	Admiral; Katsutoshi Kawano 河野 克俊 (born 1954)	14 October 2014	31 March 2019	4 years, 168 days	Japan Maritime Self-Defense Force
31	Kōji Yamazaki山崎 幸二	General; Kōji Yamazaki 山崎 幸二 (born 1961)	1 April 2019	29 March 2023	3 years, 362 days	Japan Ground Self-Defense Force
32	Yoshihide Yoshida吉田 圭秀	General; Yoshihide Yoshida 吉田 圭秀 (born 1962)	30 March 2023	31 July 2025	2 years, 123 days	Japan Ground Self-Defense Force
33	Hiroaki Uchikura内倉 浩昭	General; Hiroaki Uchikura 内倉 浩昭 (born 1965)	1 August 2025	Incumbent	1 year, 82 days	Japan Air Self-Defense Force

== See also ==
- Minister of Defense (Japan)
