= Defense Intelligence Headquarters =

Japanese military and signals intelligence agency

- DIH 情報本部; Jōhōhonbu
- Official seal of the Defense Intelligence Headquarters

Agency overview
- Formed: 20 January 1997; 29 years ago
- Preceding agency: Annex Chamber, Second Intelligence Division, Ground Staff Office
- Jurisdiction: Japan
- Headquarters: Ichigaya, Shinjuku, Tokyo, Japan
- Employees: 2,674 personnel (1,936 uniformed/738 civilian) (2025)
- Annual budget: ¥ 149 billion (2025)
- Parent agency: Ministry of Defense
- Website: Official Site (in Japanese)

The Defense Intelligence Headquarters (情報本部, Jōhōhonbu) is a military intelligence and signal intelligence agency of the Japanese government, under the jurisdiction of the Japanese Ministry of Defense. It is currently one of the biggest Japanese intelligence agencies. The DIH was modeled after the American Defense Intelligence Agency.

== History ==
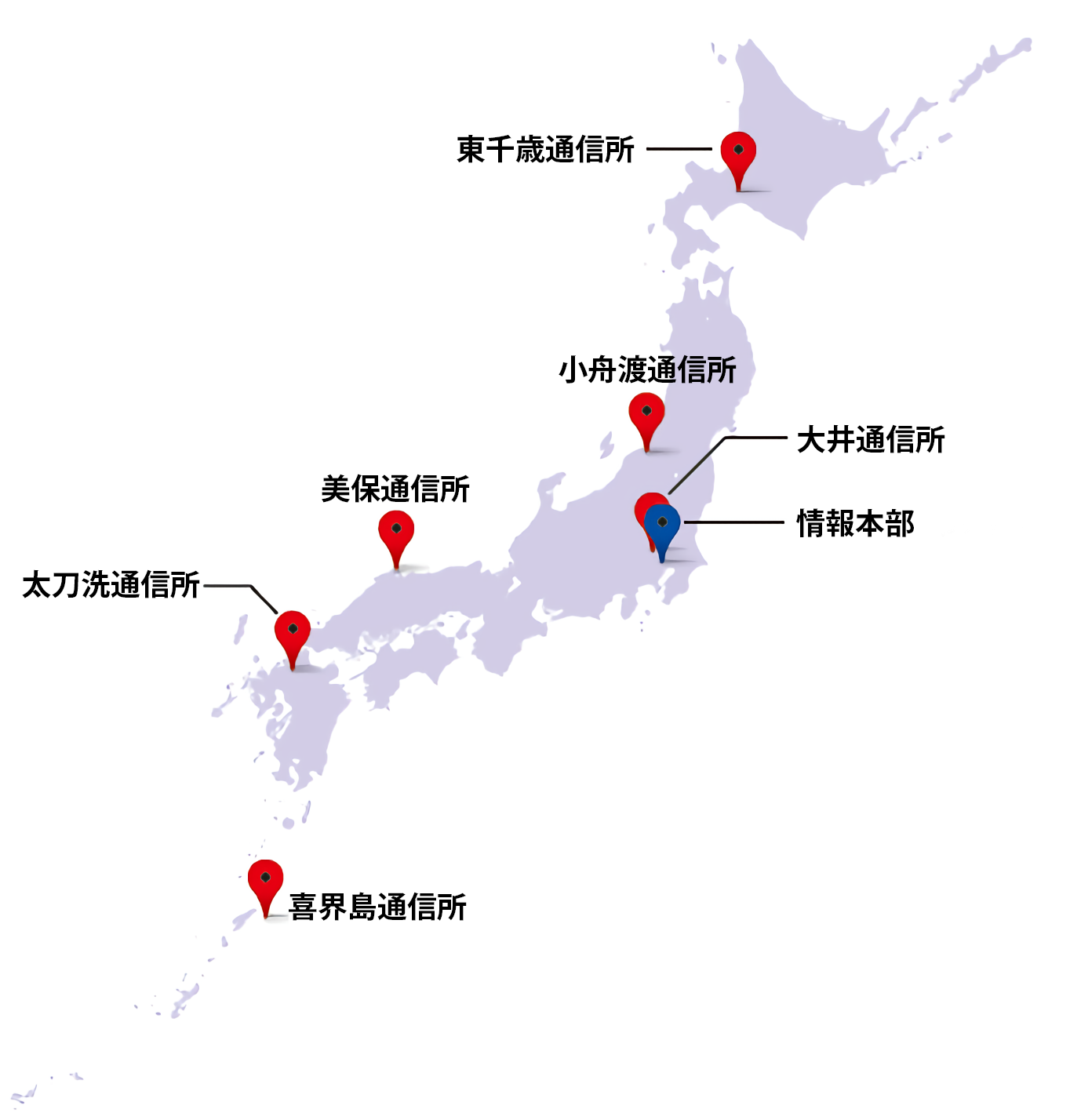
DIH facilities in Japan

Back in the 1980s, the former Defense Agency had several intelligence divisions with different duties. Among these intelligence divisions in the Defense Agency had included those from the Central Data Command Unit, the Joint Staff Council's Second Office and the three branches from the chiefs of staff in the Japan Self-Defense Forces (JSDF). Most of the DIH's establishment was based on the Annex Chamber (or Special Annex), Second Intelligence Division, Ground Staff Office. They collected signals from the Sino–Soviet border conflict of 1969 and the Soviet Afghan war of 1979. They were also involved in intercepting communications that led to and after the shooting of Korean Air Lines Flight 007 through the Wakkanai Station.

A supposed plan to integrate the intelligence divisions of the three JSDF branches started in 1988 before lack of cooperation and subordination ended it.

Plans to consolidate all the intelligence bureaus of the old Defense Administration into one agency had started in the 1990s after the National Diet had passed a law in May 1996, calling for the creation of a central military intelligence agency before the DIH was eventually established on January 20, 1997 after intelligence units from the JSDF, Japanese Defense Agency and the Joint Staff council are united with the appointment of Lieutenant General Kunimi Masahiro as the agency's first commanding officer.

Initially, DIH civilian and military staff members were numbered at 1,580 with a planned manpower of 2,000 personnel before it reached its current manpower of 2,300 staff members. In 2011, the manpower is 1,907 members

Spy satellites had been planned for launch in 1998 in order to augment the DIH's intelligence gathering capabilities. Though two were able to launch into space, two more were destroyed in a botched attempt to send them to space.

In 2005, the DIH suffered its first internal leak of classified information when a Colonel in the JASDF was arrested for allegedly leaking information regarding an accident involving a People's Liberation Army Navy Submarine that took place that same year in the South China Sea.

The DIH announced in 2006 that a liaison office had been established in Washington, D.C., with the National Security Agency.

By FY 2027, the DIH plans to use AI to automate intelligence collection through OSINT and future forecast functions.

=== Known activities ===
- After a North Korean Taepodong-1 ballistic missile had been launched on August 31, 1998, JSDF ships and aircraft began to search the Sea of Japan to collect any debris of the missile with the DIH providing intelligence support such as dispatching North Korean specialists to the United States over the matter.
- North Korean radio communications were intercepted by the SIGINT division's Kikaijima, Kagoshima radio monitoring station. The successful interception of North Korean communications later led to a naval shootout between ships of the Japan Coast Guard and a suspected North Korean spy boat in 2001 near the island of Amami-Ōshima before the latter had been destroyed.
- The DIH had provided intelligence to JGSDF forces that were deployed in Indonesia during the 2006 Yogyakarta earthquake.
- Using a signals intelligence facility in Tachiarai, the DIH reportedly monitor communications from transiting satellites for Cybersecurity as part of a program codenamed MALLARD. The program reportedly intercepts more than 12 million Internet communications per day.
- In May 2019, several Chinese JH7 fighter-bombers conducted a training exercise over the high seas of the East China Sea, using a JMSDF destroyer as a target for attack. The JSDF side is said to have intercepted radio transmissions emitted by the Chinese warplanes stating that they were training to attack the Maritime Self-Defense Force ships as targets.

== Command ==
The DIH is under the jurisdiction of the Joint Staff and is controlled by the Defense Intelligence Committee, which is made up of the Chiefs of Staff of the JGSDF, JMSDF and JASDF along with the Chief of Staff, Joint Staff, State Minister of Defense and the Minister of Defense.

Command of the DIH was given directly to the Japanese Minister of Defense in March 2006. The deputy officer is usually a civilian officially appointed by the MOD. Four Defense Intelligence Officers (DIOs) are also appointed with three being colonels from the JGSDF or the JASDF with one a civilian official.

The SIGINT facilities managed by the Chobetsu (Chosa Besshitsu) or the Annex Chamber, Second Section, Second Investigation Division in English, from 1958 to 1997, is currently managed by the DIH. Command of the SIGINT division is usually filled by a senior officer appointed by the NPA from the Prefectural Police.

== Organization ==
A number of divisions were established under the DIH, including the following:

Directorate	Mandate
Directorate for Administration	Provides administrative and logistics support
Directorate for Programs	Conducts and plans DIH's intelligence collection/analysis plans. Serves as the point of contact when coordinating work with intelligence agencies in and out of the MOD.
Directorate for Geospatial Intelligence	Analyzes satellite images from various satellites such as Information Gathering Satellite and geospatial-based information.
Directorate for Signal Intelligence	Analyzes SIGINT intelligence. Is responsible for its electronics unit in Ichigaya to monitor North Korea, China and Russia-based military communications. It also manages two CDAA 'elephant cages,' as well as six other communications offices. They are located in Kobunato, Niigata Prefecture, Oi, Saitama Prefecture, Tachiarai, Fukushima Prefecture and Kikaijima, Kagoshima Prefecture.
Directorate for Assessment	Summarizes/assesses open-source intelligence from Japanese military attachés serving abroad, intelligence from friendly nations and from DIH collaborators and agents
Directorate for Joint Intelligence	Collect and analyse intelligence which is needed to cope with immediately and support Chief of JSO and SDFs directly. This division is a part of DIH, but also is expected to be used as J-2 of JSO.

== Role ==
The main role of the DIH is to collect information and analyse for planning defense and operation policy. The agency collect information from open sources, signals and image intelligence as well as from other Japanese government ministries, Japanese embassies and other affiliated ministries and organizations. In addition, they also gather intelligence through surveillance activities.

The analysis results are reported and shared with the Prime Minister, the Minister of Defense, internal departments and other organizations of the Ministry of Defense, National Security Council (Japan) and other relevant ministries and agencies, and units of the Ground, Maritime, and Air Self-Defense Forces for use in policy decisions and unit operations.

In addition, in the National Defense Strategy approved by the Cabinet in December 2022, the DIH is expected to play a central role in information warfare in the defense of Japan, in addition to its existing role.

It is not allowed to obtain non-military intelligence in Japan or information from cyberspace.

== Seal ==
The seal of the DIH consist of the following symbols:

- Pheasant – Quality of intelligence gathering at high speed
- Red oval shapes around Earth – Positions of spy satellites
- Lightning – Radio waves
- Star – Section and Stations of the DIH

== Known DIH directors ==
DIH directors are usually positioned by a Lieutenant General from the JGSDF/JASDF or a Vice Admiral from the JMSDF.

- Fumio Ota
- Kenichiro Hokazono; the former Chief of Air Staff
- Koji Shimohira
- Tadashi Miyagawa (宮川正)

== Bibliography ==
- Davies, Philip H.J.; Gustafson, Kristian, eds. (2013). Intelligence Elsewhere: Spies and Espionage Outside the Anglosphere. Georgetown University Press. ISBN 978-1589019560.
- Dover, Robert; Goodman, Michael S.; Hillebrand, Claudia, eds. (2014). Routledge Companion to Intelligence Studies. New York: Routledge. ISBN 978-1589019560.
- Samuels, Richard J. (2019). Special Duty: A History of the Japanese Intelligence Community. Cornell University Press. ISBN 978-1501741586.
- Williams, Brad (2021). Japanese Foreign Intelligence and Grand Strategy: From the Cold War to the Abe Era. Georgetown University Press. ISBN 978-1647120634.
