= Shunji Izutsu =

Japanese military officer (born 1964)

- 井筒 俊司
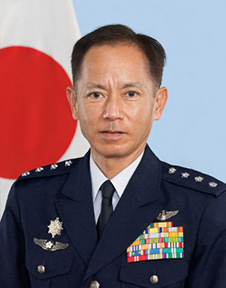
- Official Portrait

Chief of Staff, Air Self-Defense Force
- In office 25 August 2020 – 03 March 2023
- Preceded by: Marumo Yoshinari
- Succeeded by: Hiroaki Uchikura

Personal details
- Born: 26 March 1964 (age 62) Chiba Prefecture, Japan

Military service
- Allegiance: Japan
- Branch/service: Japan Air Self-Defense Force
- Years of service: 1986–2023
- Rank: General (JASDF)
- Commands: 6th Air Wing; Western Air Defense Force; Air Defense Command Chief of Staff, Air Self-Defense Force

General Shunji “Bert” Izutsu (井筒 俊司) is a former military officer of the Japan Air Self-Defense Force who most notably served as the branch’s 35th Chief of Staff From 2020 until his retirement in 2023.

== Biography ==
=== Career ===
Born on 26 March 1964 in Chiba Prefecture Izutsu graduated from the National Defense Academy of Japan in March 1986 and joined the Japan Air Self-Defense Force with the rank of Second Lieutenant.

His early career was spent as a pilot flying the Mcdonnell Douglas F-4EJ Phantom II and the Mitsubishi F-15J with over 2,700 hours of successful mission flight time. By 2000 he was a Lieutenant Colonel and in 2002 Izutsu was appointed to the Air Staff Office.

In 2005 he was promoted to Colonel and attended the Air Staff College, the next year he returned to the Air Staff Office before being assigned to the command staff of the 7th Air Wing.

In 2011 he was promoted to Major General and put in command of the 6th Air Wing before being made Deputy Commander of the Southwestern Air Defense Force the following year.

In 2017 he was promoted to Lieutenant General and put in charge of the Western Air Defense Force followed by his appointment as commander of the Air Defense Command in 2019.

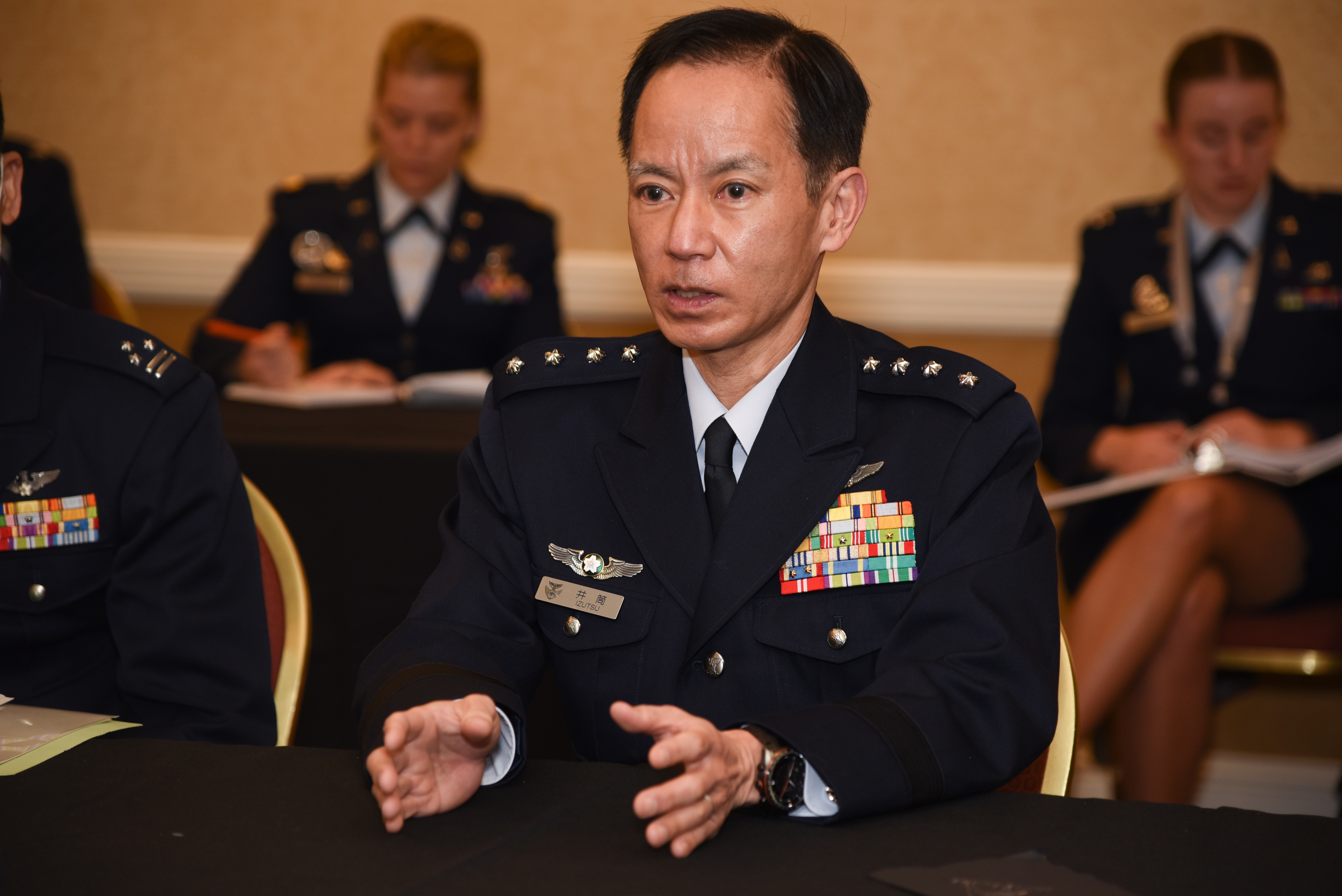
General Izutsu attending the 37th Space Symposium at Peterson Space Force Base in 2022

In 2020 he was promoted to General and made Chief of Staff of the Air Self-Defense Force, a position he held until his retirement on 30 March 2023.

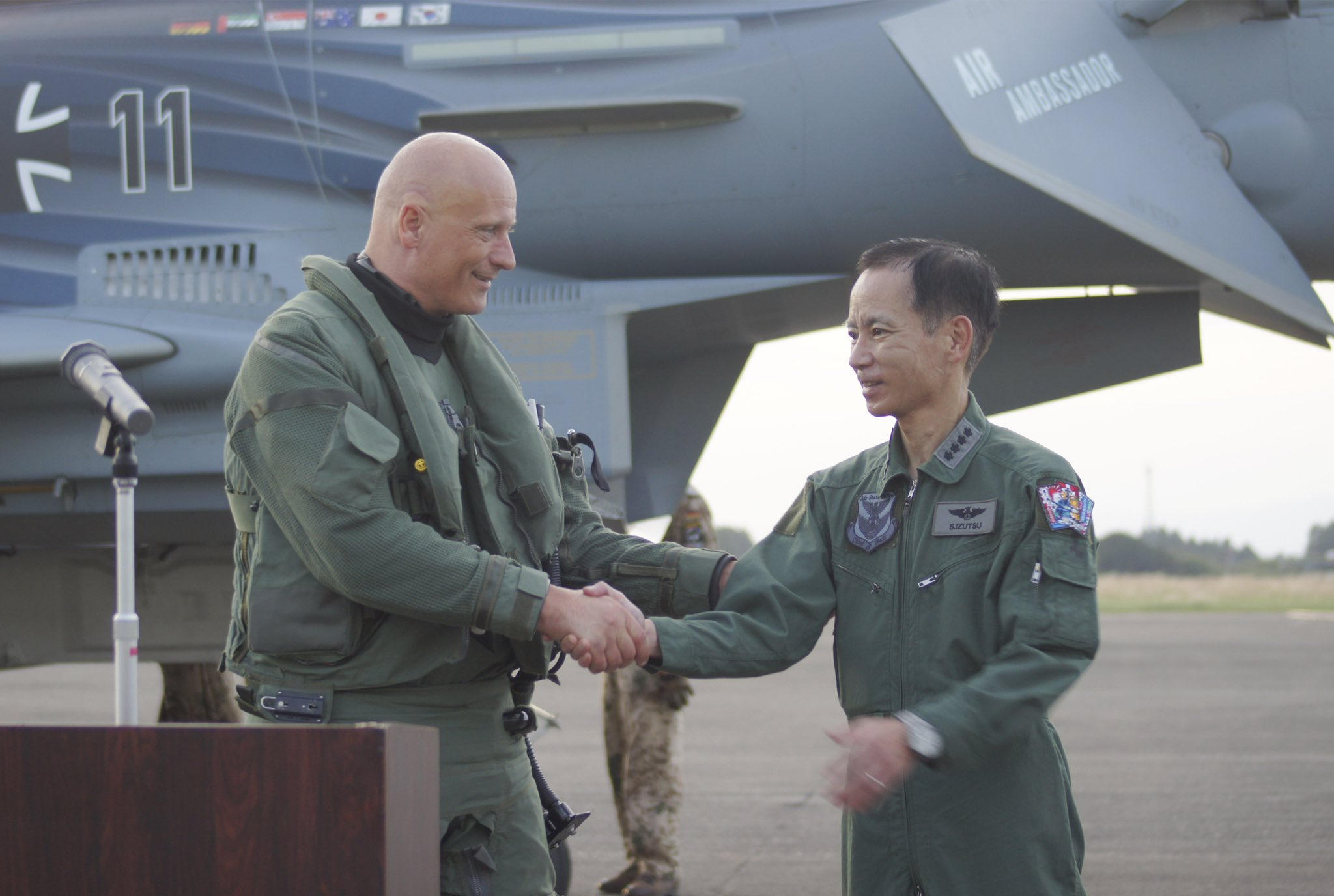
General Izutsu with German Lieutenant General and Inspector of the Air Force Ingo Gerhartz in 2022

=== Later life ===
After his retirement Izutsu become the Vice President of Astroscale Japan a subsidiary of Astroscale, a private multinational space debris removal company headquartered in Tokyo.

== Awards ==
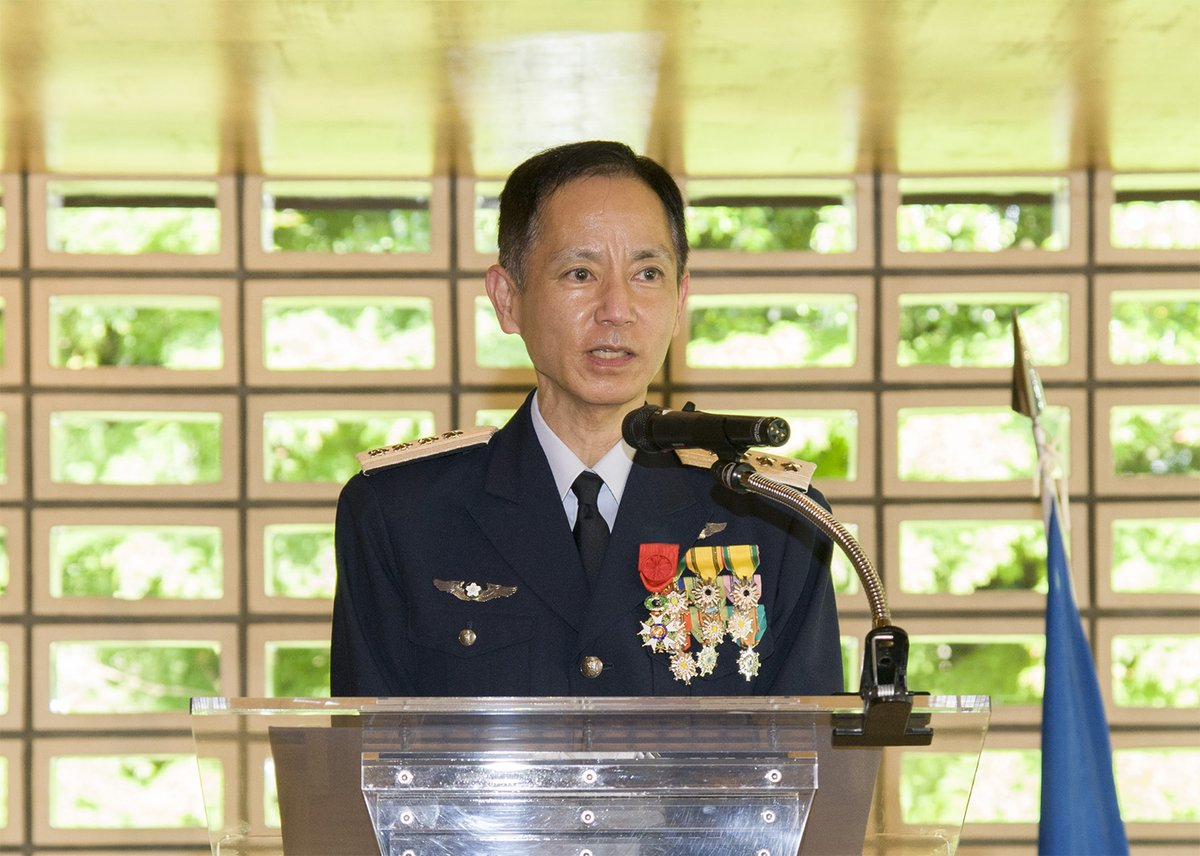
General Izutsu giving a speech after being awarded the French Legion of Honour in 2022

- - Officer, Legion of Honour

=== Defensive memorial cordon ===
- 3rd Defensive Memorial Cordon
- 5th Defensive Memorial Cordon
- 6th Defensive Memorial Cordon
- 7th Defensive Memorial Cordon
- 9th Defensive Memorial Cordon
- 10th Defensive Memorial Cordon
- 11th Defensive Memorial Cordon
- 13th Defensive Memorial Cordon
- 14th Defensive Memorial Cordon
- 16th Defensive Memorial Cordon with one Silver Cherry Blossom
- 18th Defensive Memorial Cordon with one Gold Cherry Blossom
- 19th Defensive Memorial Cordon
- 20th Defensive Memorial Cordon
- 21st Defensive Memorial Cordon
- 26th Defensive Memorial Cordon with two Gold Cherry Blossoms
- 31st Defensive Memorial Cordon
- 32nd Defensive Memorial Cordon
- 33rd Defensive Memorial Cordon
- 36th Defensive Memorial Cordon
- 39th Defensive Memorial Cordon
