= Joint Staff College =

- 統合幕僚学校
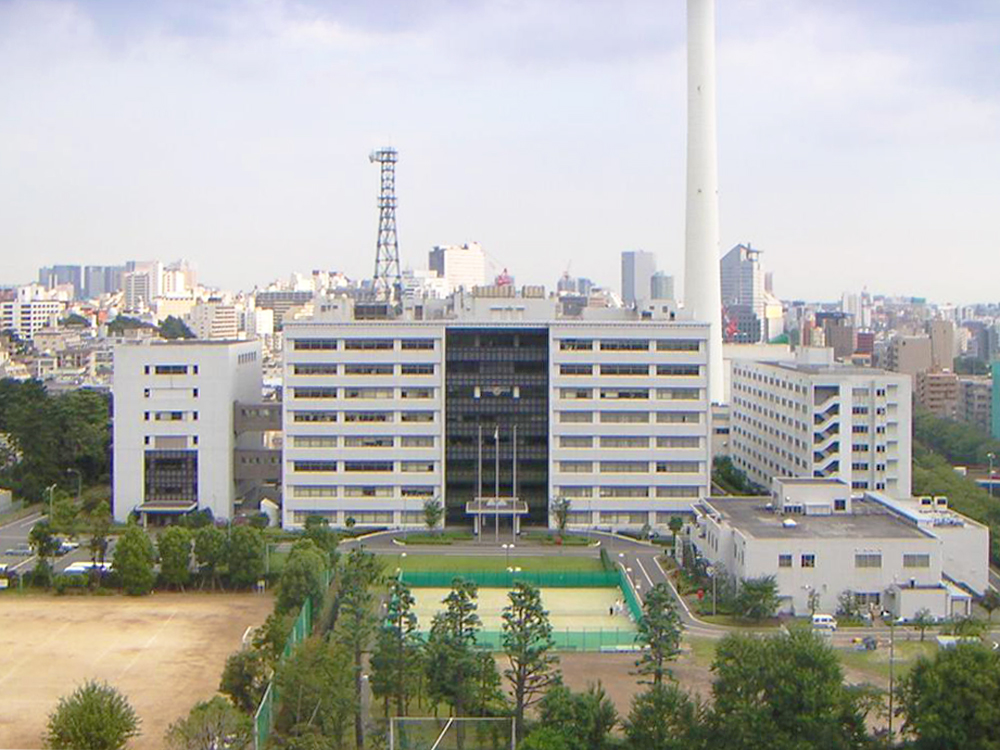

Location
- Japan; 35.6393°N 139.7065°E

Information
- Established: August 1961; 65 years ago
- Authority: Joint Staff Office, Ministry of Defense
- Affiliation: National Defense Academy of Japan
- Website: Official website

The Joint Staff College (統合幕僚学校, Tōgō bakuryō gakkō) (abbreviated JSC) is an educational institution administered by the Ministry of Defense's Joint Staff Office.

== History ==
Established in August 1961, it provides post-National Defense Academy of Japan education and professional training to officers.
