= Ministry of Defense (Japan) =

Government ministry of Japan

- 防衛省; Bōei-shō

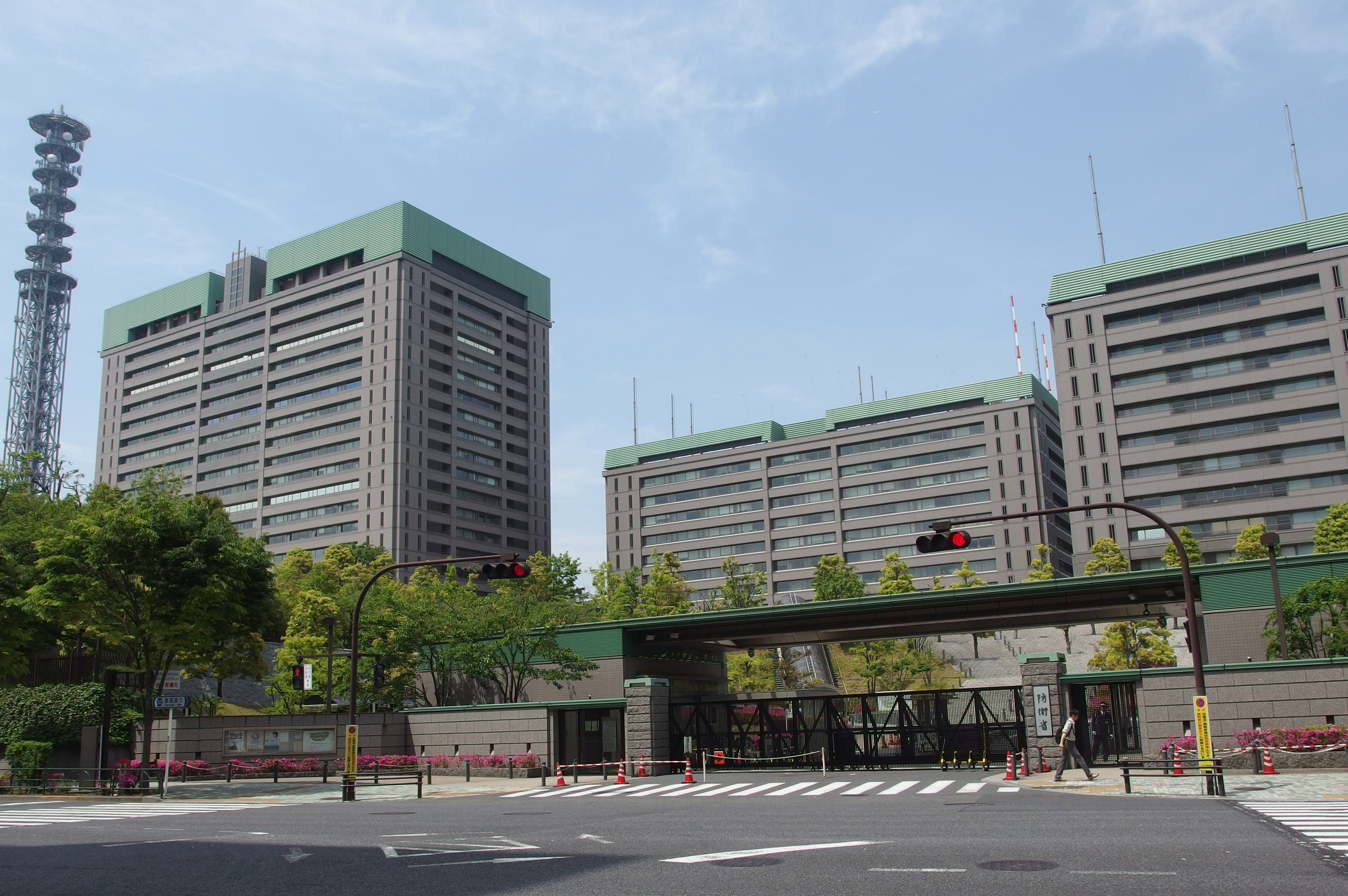
- Ministry of Defense (防衛省, Bōei-shō) in Shinjuku, Tokyo

Agency overview
- Formed: 9 January 2007; 19 years ago
- Preceding agency: Defense Agency
- Jurisdiction: Government of Japan
- Headquarters: 5-1 Ichigaya-honmuracho, Ichigaya, Shinjuku-ku, Tokyo, Japan; 35.693°N 139.728°E
- Employees: 20,924 civilian staff; 247,154 SDF personnel (excluding non-capacity National Defense Academy students, SDF reserve personnel, ready reserve SDF personnel, etc.)
- Annual budget: 7.9 trillion yen
- Minister responsible: Shinjirō Koizumi, Minister of Defense
- Deputy Ministers responsible: Masahisa Miyazaki, State Minister; Shinji Yoshida, Parliamentary Vice-Minister; Yohei Wakabayashi, Parliamentary Vice-Minister
- Child agencies: Acquisition, Technology & Logistics Agency; Defense Intelligence Headquarters
- Website: mod.go.jp/en

The Ministry of Defense (防衛省, Bōei-shō) is an executive department of the Government of Japan responsible for preserving the peace and independence of Japan, and maintaining the country's national security and the Japan Self-Defense Forces.

The ministry is headed by the Minister of Defense, and is the largest ministry in the Japanese government. The ministry is headquartered in Ichigaya, Shinjuku, Tokyo, and is required by Article 66 of the Constitution to be completely subordinate to civilian authority. Its head has the rank of Minister of State. He is assisted by two vice ministers, one parliamentary and one administrative; and the internal bureaus. The highest figure in the command structure is the Prime Minister, who is responsible directly to the National Diet. The MOD, alongside the Ministry of Foreign Affairs, work on crafting Japanese security policy.

In a national emergency, the Prime Minister is authorized to order the various components of the Japan Self-Defense Forces (JSDF) into action, subject to the consent of the Diet. In times of extreme emergency, that approval might be obtained after the fact.

Their activities are regulated under the Ministry of Defense Establishment Law (防衛省設置法, Bōeishōsetchihō).

== History ==
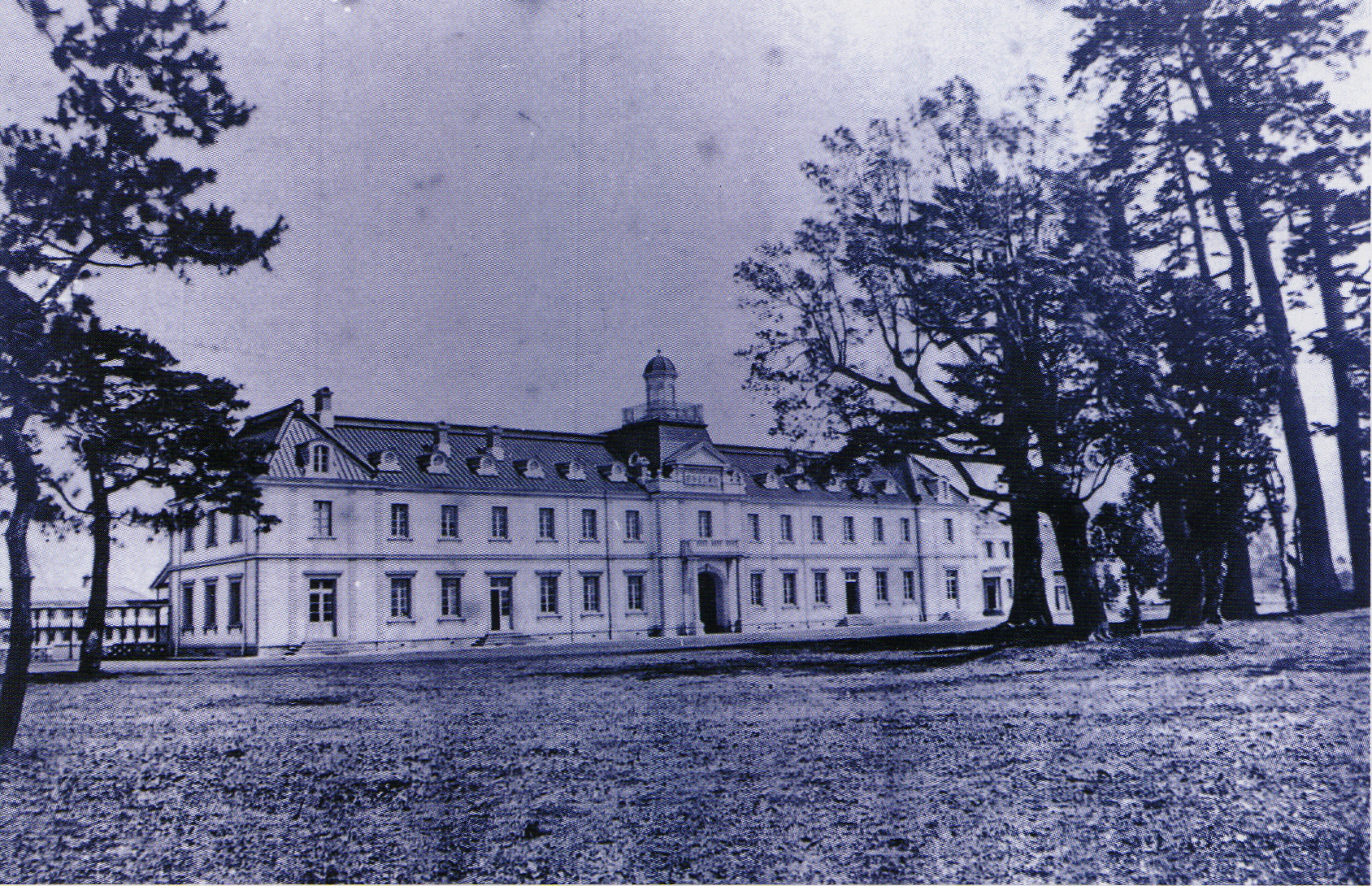
The Imperial Japanese Army Academy in Ichigaya, Tokyo (市ヶ谷陸軍士官学校), built by the second French Military Mission to Japan, on the ground of today's Ministry of Defense (1874 photograph)

=== Defense Agency (1954–2007) ===
The Japan Defense Agency (JDA) was established on 1 July 1954 as the central administrative body responsible for Japan's defense and oversight of the Japan Self-Defense Forces (JSDF). Until May 2000 it was headquartered in Akasaka (a site later redeveloped as Tokyo Midtown). Under Article 2 of the Defense Agency Establishment Law, the JDA was initially placed under the authority of the Prime Minister's Office. Following reforms to Japan's central government structure, the agency was placed under the Cabinet Office in 2001.

Within the agency, several internal bureaus played central roles in policymaking and civilian oversight of the JSDF. The Bureau of Defense Policy was responsible for drafting defense policies and programs, determining operational activities, and conducting information gathering and analysis. The Bureau of Finance developed the agency's budget and set spending priorities for both the Defense Agency and the JSDF. The Bureau of Equipment oversaw procurement and equipment management, with subunits corresponding to the ground, maritime, and air services. Major procurement proposals were reviewed by these bureaus before being submitted to the National Diet for approval.

Uniformed JSDF personnel operated alongside these civilian bureaus. The senior uniformed officer was the chairman of the Joint Staff Council, which included the chiefs of staff of the ground, maritime, and air branches. The council's functions included advising the director general of the Defense Agency and planning and executing joint exercises. Each of the three services maintained its own staff offices to manage operations. While military rank determined command structures within each service, all branches were directly responsible to the director general and functioned as coequal bodies with the Joint Staff Council and the staff offices.

This structure was intended to prevent the concentration of military authority seen prior to 1945 under the Imperial General Staff and the Supreme War Council. However, it also limited coordination between services, as formal exchanges among commanders were relatively few. Some senior officers expressed dissatisfaction with the level of authority held by civilian officials in the internal bureaus, many of whom had limited military experience. During the early 1980s the Joint Staff Council was expanded to improve communication between the bureaus and service staff offices, and centralized command and communications systems were developed to link service headquarters with the Defense Agency.

Efforts were also made in the 1980s to clarify command authority during emergencies. The government maintained the principle that military action must remain under civilian control, though concerns were raised that delays in consultation could create operational risks. As a result, vessels of the Japan Maritime Self-Defense Force began carrying live torpedoes and fighter-interceptors were permitted to carry missiles continuously. However, ships were still required to receive specific orders before interdicting intruding vessels. The Defense Agency also considered developing more detailed guidelines for JSDF actions during emergencies.

Cooperation between the JSDF and civilian agencies in contingency planning remained limited. Plans for utilizing civilian aircraft and merchant fleets during crises were underdeveloped, despite the JSDF's relatively limited transport capacity. In 1990 legislation was considered to allow the JSDF to respond to emergency situations not explicitly covered by Article 76 of the Self-Defense Forces Law.

During this period the JSDF also undertook gradual modernization of its equipment. In 1987 the Defense Agency replaced its communications network, which had relied on telephone lines operated by Nippon Telegraph and Telephone, with a microwave network incorporating satellite-based transmission. Despite these improvements, by 1990 stockpiles of ammunition and maintenance supplies were still considered inadequate.

The Defense Agency was occasionally the target of political violence. In 2004, the agency's headquarters was attacked by a Kakurōkyō cell using improvised mortar barrages.

=== Establishment of the Ministry of Defense ===
On 8 June 2006, the Cabinet of Japan endorsed a bill to elevate the Defense Agency (防衛庁, Bōei-chō) to a full cabinet-level Ministry of Defense (防衛省, Bōei-shō) under the Cabinet Office. The “Bill for Partial Revision of the Defense Agency Establishment Law” was submitted to the National Diet on 9 June 2006.

The bill was approved by the House of Representatives on 30 November 2006. It was subsequently passed by the House of Councillors on 15 December 2006, formally approving the transition from agency to ministry. The legislation received support from the Liberal Democratic Party, Democratic Party of Japan, Komeito, and the People's New Party.

Opposition came from the Japanese Communist Party and the Social Democratic Party, which argued that the move could contribute to Japan becoming involved in future wars. Some countries in the Asia-Pacific region also expressed concern, citing historical memories of Japanese imperial rule during World War II.

The Ministry of Defense was formally established on 9 January 2007, assuming the name and status of a full cabinet ministry. At the same time, the Defense Facilities Administrative Agency was dissolved and integrated into the new ministry.

In 2017, the ministry became embroiled in controversy over operational logs kept by the Japan Ground Self-Defense Force engineering unit deployed to South Sudan as part of the United Nations Mission in South Sudan. The Ministry of Defense initially reported that daily activity logs describing conditions in the conflict zone had been discarded, but it was later revealed that electronic copies had been retained within internal systems, prompting accusations that officials had mishandled or attempted to conceal the records. The controversy intensified political scrutiny of the ministry and contributed to the resignation of Defense Minister Tomomi Inada in July 2017 amid broader criticism of the ministry's handling of documentation related to overseas deployments.

=== Incidents and security events ===
In July 2007, a 21-year-old right-wing activist forced his way through the main gate of the Ministry of Defense complex and threw a Molotov cocktail toward the building before being apprehended.

On 22 October 2025, the Tokyo Metropolitan Police Department began investigating the death of a 60-year-old ministry official who was found unconscious after falling down an elevator shaft inside the Ministry of Defense building.

=== Defense of Japan white paper ===
Defense of Japan (防衛白書, Bōei hakusho) is an annual white paper published by Japan's Ministry of Defense. The report provides a comprehensive overview of Japan's defense policy, national security environment, and activities of the Self-Defense Forces. The publication is translated from Japanese into English and Chinese and made publicly available on the ministry's website. Digital archives of the white paper are also provided online, with available issues dating back to 2014.

== Ministerial team ==
The Ministers in the Ministry of Defense are as follows:

Minister	Rank	Portfolio
Shinjirō Koizumi	Minister of Defense (防衛大臣)	The Minister of Defense is responsible for the organization and formulating the national security policy.
Masahisa Miyazaki	State Minister of Defense (防衛副大臣)	The deputy minister in charge of the Ministry of Defense and a certification officer.
Shinji Yoshida, Yohei Wakabayashi	Parliamentary Vice-Minister of Defense (防衛大臣政務官)	The Parliamentary Vice-Minister of Defense is the Secretary of State for the Japan Ministry of Defense. There are two people with this rank.

== Senior officials ==
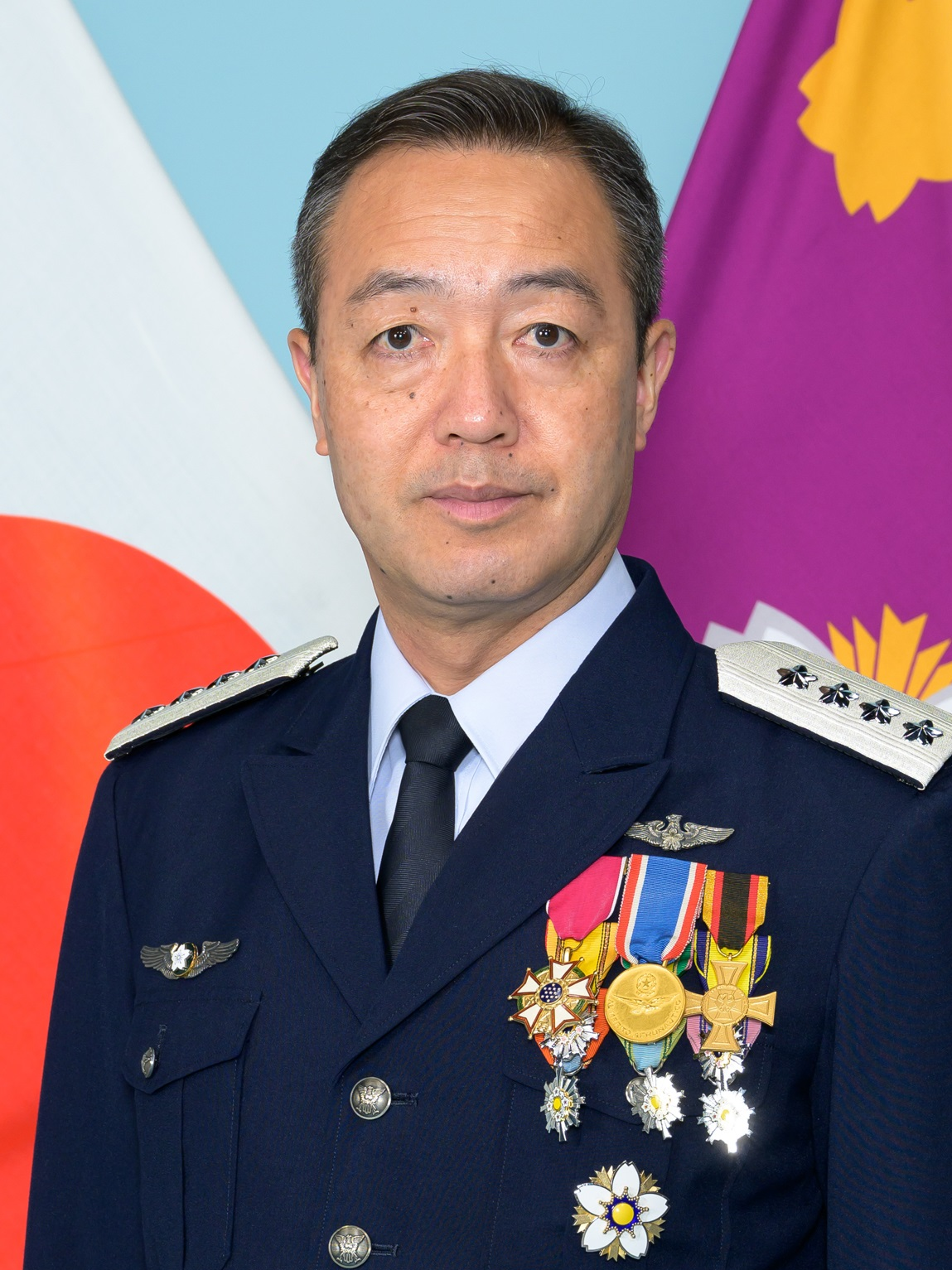
General Hiroaki Uchikura, the Chief of Staff, Joint Staff

=== Senior Advisers ===
The Senior Advisers to the Minister of Defense are senior policy advisers to the Minister of Defense.

- Senior Advisers to the Minister of Defense (防衛大臣補佐官)

=== Special Advisers ===
The Special Advisers to the Minister of Defense are special policy advisers to the Minister of Defense.

- Special Advisers to the Minister of Defense (防衛大臣政策参与)

=== Vice Minister and other officials ===
The Administrative Vice-Minister of Defense, the senior civil-servant at the Ministry of Defense, has the role of coordinating the affairs of the Ministry and of supervising the Ministry's bureaus and organs.

- Administrative Vice-Minister of Defense (防衛事務次官)
- Vice-Minister of Defense for International Affairs (防衛審議官)
- Private Secretary of the Minister of Defense (防衛大臣秘書官)

=== Military Commanders ===
The Chief of Staff, Joint Staff is the highest-ranking military officer of the Japan Self-Defense Forces, and the senior military adviser to the Minister of Defense and the Japanese Government. He is supported by the Vice Chief of Staff, Joint Staff. He is appointed by the Minister of Defense, approved by the Cabinet.

- Chief of Staff, Joint Staff (統合幕僚長)
- Vice Chief of Staff, Joint Staff (統合幕僚副長)

== Organization ==
The Ministry of Defense includes a number of organizations as of 2024:

Internal Bureaus (内部部局)

- Minister's Secretariat (大臣官房)
- Bureau of Defense Policy (防衛政策局)
- Bureau of Personnel and Education (人事教育局)
- Bureau of Defense Buildup Planning (整備計画局)
- Bureau of Local Cooperation (地方企画局)

Councils, etc. (審議会等)

- Self-Defense Forces Personnel Ethics Review Board (自衛隊員倫理審査会)
- Central Council on Defense Facilities (防衛施設中央審議会)
- Defense Personnel Review Board (防衛人事審議会)
- Review Board on the Recognition of Prisoner of War Status (捕虜資格認定等審査会)
- Evaluation Committee for Incorporated Administrative Agencies (独立行政法人評価委員会)

Facilities, etc. (施設等機関)

- National Defense Academy (防衛大学校)
- National Defense Medical College (防衛医科大学校)
- National Institute for Defense Studies (防衛研究所)

Extraordinary Organs (特別の機関)

- Defense Council (防衛会議)
- Joint Staff (統合幕僚監部)
  - Joint Staff College (統合幕僚学校)
- Ground Staff Office (陸上幕僚監部)
- Maritime Staff Office (海上幕僚監部)
- Air Staff Office (航空幕僚監部)
- Ground Self-Defense Force (陸上自衛隊)
- Maritime Self-Defense Force (海上自衛隊)
- Air Self-Defense Force (航空自衛隊)
- Defense Intelligence Headquarters (情報本部)
- Inspector General's Office of Legal Compliance (防衛監察本部)
- Foreign Military Supply Tribunal (外国軍用品審判所)

Common Institutions (共同の機関)

- Self-Defense Forces Central Hospital (自衛隊中央病院)
- Self-Defense Forces District Hospitals (自衛隊地区病院)
- Self-Defense Forces Physical Training School (自衛隊体育学校)
- Self-Defense Forces Provincial Cooperation Offices (自衛隊地方協力本部)

Common Units (共同の部隊)

- Self-Defense Forces Cyber Defense Command (自衛隊サイバー防衛隊)
- Self-Defense Forces Intelligence Security Command (自衛隊情報保全隊)

Local Branch Bureaus (地方支分部局)

- Regional Defense Bureaus (地方防衛局)
  - Hokkaidō Defense Bureau (北海道防衛局)
  - Tōhoku Defense Bureau (東北防衛局)
  - North Kantō Defense Bureau (北関東防衛局)
  - South Kantō Defense Bureau (南関東防衛局)
  - Kinki-Chūbu Defense Bureau (近畿中部防衛局)
  - Chūgoku-Shikoku Defense Bureau (中国四国防衛局)
  - Kyūshū Defense Bureau (九州防衛局)
  - Okinawa Defense Bureau (沖縄防衛局)

External Agencies

- Acquisition, Technology & Logistics Agency (防衛装備庁)
