= Joint Staff Office =

Office of high-ranking Japanese military leaders for coordinating JSDF activities

- 統合幕僚監部; Tōgō Bakuryō Kanbu
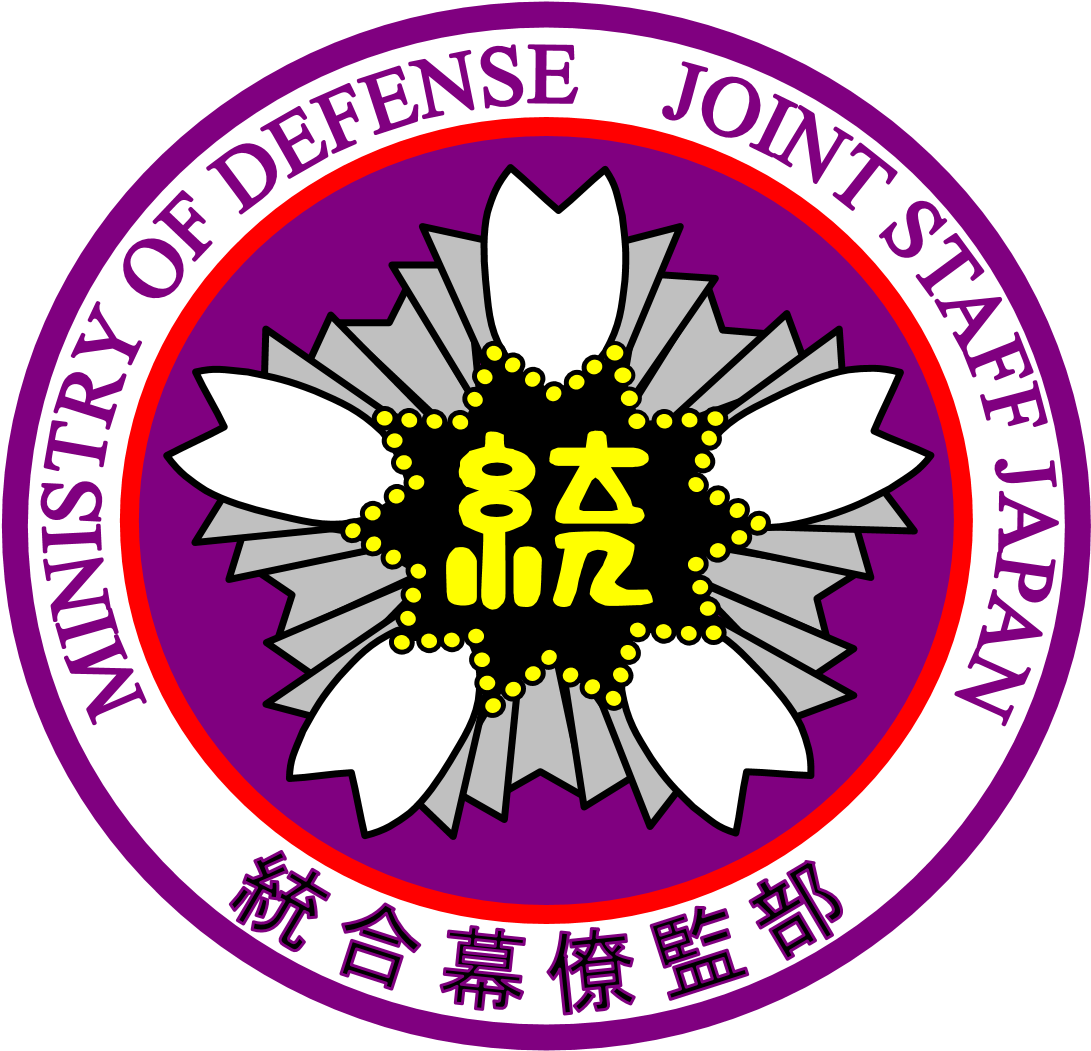

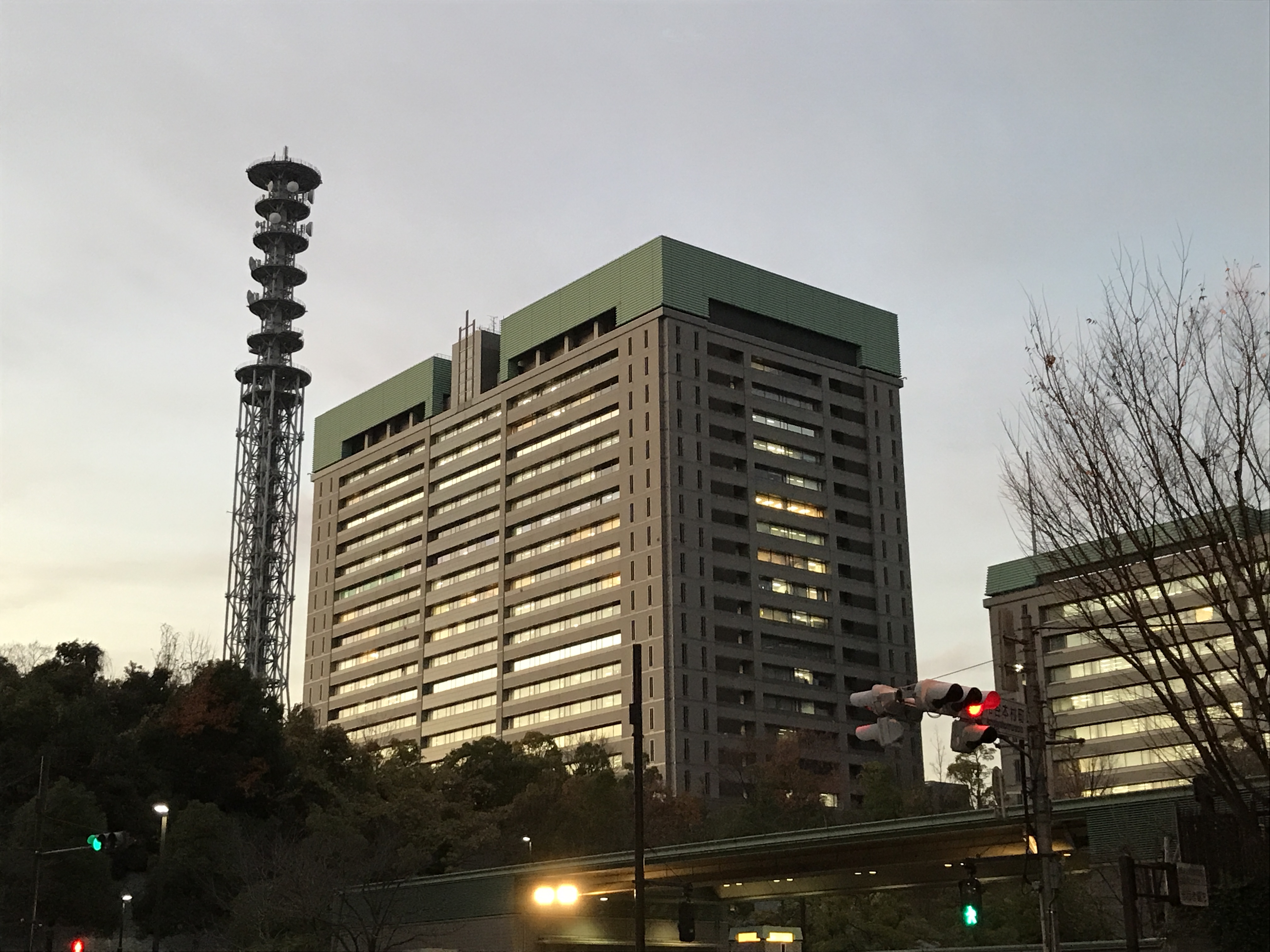

Agency overview
- Formed: July 1954
- Jurisdiction: Government of Japan
- Headquarters: Shinjuku Ward, Tokyo, Japan
- Agency executive: General Hiroaki Uchikura, Chief of Staff, Joint Staff
- Parent department: Ministry of Defense (Japan)
- Child agencies: Joint Staff College; SDF Intelligence Security Command; JSDF Cyber Defence Command
- Website: Joint Staff Office Homepage

The Joint Staff Office (Japanese: 統合幕僚監部, Tōgō bakuryō-kanbu: abbreviation: JSO), also known as the Joint Staff and formerly known as the Joint Staff Council, is one of the administrative agencies within the Government of Japan. It is a special organisation under the Japanese Ministry of Defense responsible for integrating the military operations of the Ground, Maritime and Air Self-Defense Forces. The abbreviation of the agency in Japanese is Tōbaku (統幕).

The JSO is considered to be the equivalent of the Joint Chiefs of Staff of foreign armed forces, including that of the United States. Its predecessor was the Joint Chiefs Council (JSC). The office is located in Shinjuku Ward, Tokyo.

== History ==
The Chief of Staff, Joint Staff is General Yoshihide Yoshida, who replaced General Koji Yamazaki after being appointed on 22 March 2023.

On 30 October 2024, Ministry of Defense (MoD) decided to extend Chief of Staff, JS / General Yoshihide Yoshida's term to 29 April 2025.

== Organization ==
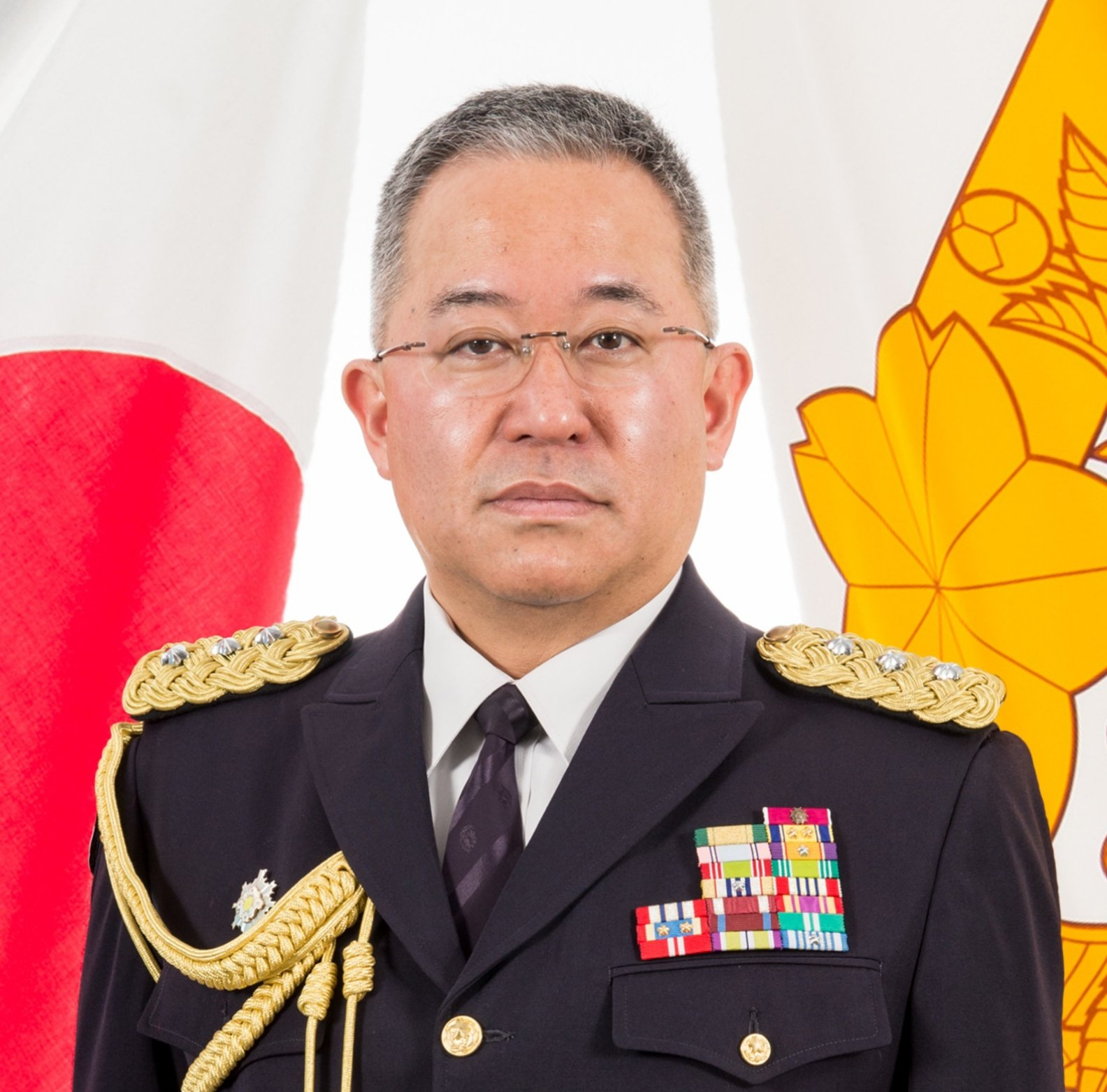
General Yoshihide Yoshida, current Chief of Staff, Joint Staff for the Japan Self Defense Forces.

The JSO is divided into four departments as can be seen below. Each department has an associated code beginning with the letter J and a corresponding single-digit number.

The Joint Staff also consists of four special staff (Joint Staff Councilor/Director General, Public Affairs Director General and Legal Affairs General).

JSO internal structure consist of the following:

- General Affairs Department (J-1)
- Operations Department (J-3)
- Logistics (J-4)
- Defense Plans and Policy Department (J-5)
- C4 Systems Department (J-6)

== Main Executives ==
Main Executives
Government Post Name	Rank	name	Date of Appointment
Chief of Staff, JS	General	Yoshihide Yoshida	30 March 2023
Vice Chief of Staff, JS	Lieutenant General	Kenichiro Nagumo	30 March 2023
Senior Enlisted Advisor to the chief of staff	Warrant Officer	Osamu Kai	6 June 2024
Administrative Vice Chief of Staff, JS	Defense Administrative	Isao Ono	19 July 2024
Director, General Affairs Department (J-1)	Major General	Keitaro Takaishi	2 August 2024
Director, Operations Department (J-3)	Vice Admiral	Shinichi Kawamura	2 August 2024
Director, Defense Plans and Policy Department(J-5)	Major General	Nobutaka Minamikawa	23 December 2022
Director, C4 Systems Department (J-6)	Major General	Yasuhiro Kato	29 August 2023
Principal Joint Staff Councilor	Defense Administrative	Yasuhiro Miyamoto	July 2024
Joint Staff Councilor	Defense Administrative	Kyoichi Nakao	October 2024
Director, Public Affairs	Major General	Yuki Sakata	29 August 2023
Legal Affairs General	Colonel	Junji Shinagawa	13 March 2023
Director, Logistics (J-4)	Major General	Toshio Imai	28 March 2024

== Duties ==
The duties of JSO includes the following.

The JSO is responsible for coordinating the activities of the ground, maritime and air service branches of the Japan Self-Defense Forces.

- Vice Chief of Staff, JS support Chief of Staff, JS in fixing and supervising affairs related to JSO.
- Administrative Vice Chief of Staff, JS sum up and organize affairs related to the coordination of important matters related to JSO affairs.
- General Affairs Department is responsible for building work plans related to JSO, account, and benefits.
- Operations Department is in charge of the overall coordination of the action planning and operations related to emergency reaction measures.
- Defense Plans and Policy Department is responsible for defense and security planning from executing mission smoothly through joint operations point of view.
- C4 systems Department is in charge of not only planning and supervising communications necessary for planning actions but also planning and managing the use radio waves.

== Affiliated organizations ==
Founded in 1961, the Joint Staff College is an affiliated school of the JSO and the Ministry of Defense.
