= Kōji Yamazaki =

Japanese general

- 山崎 幸二
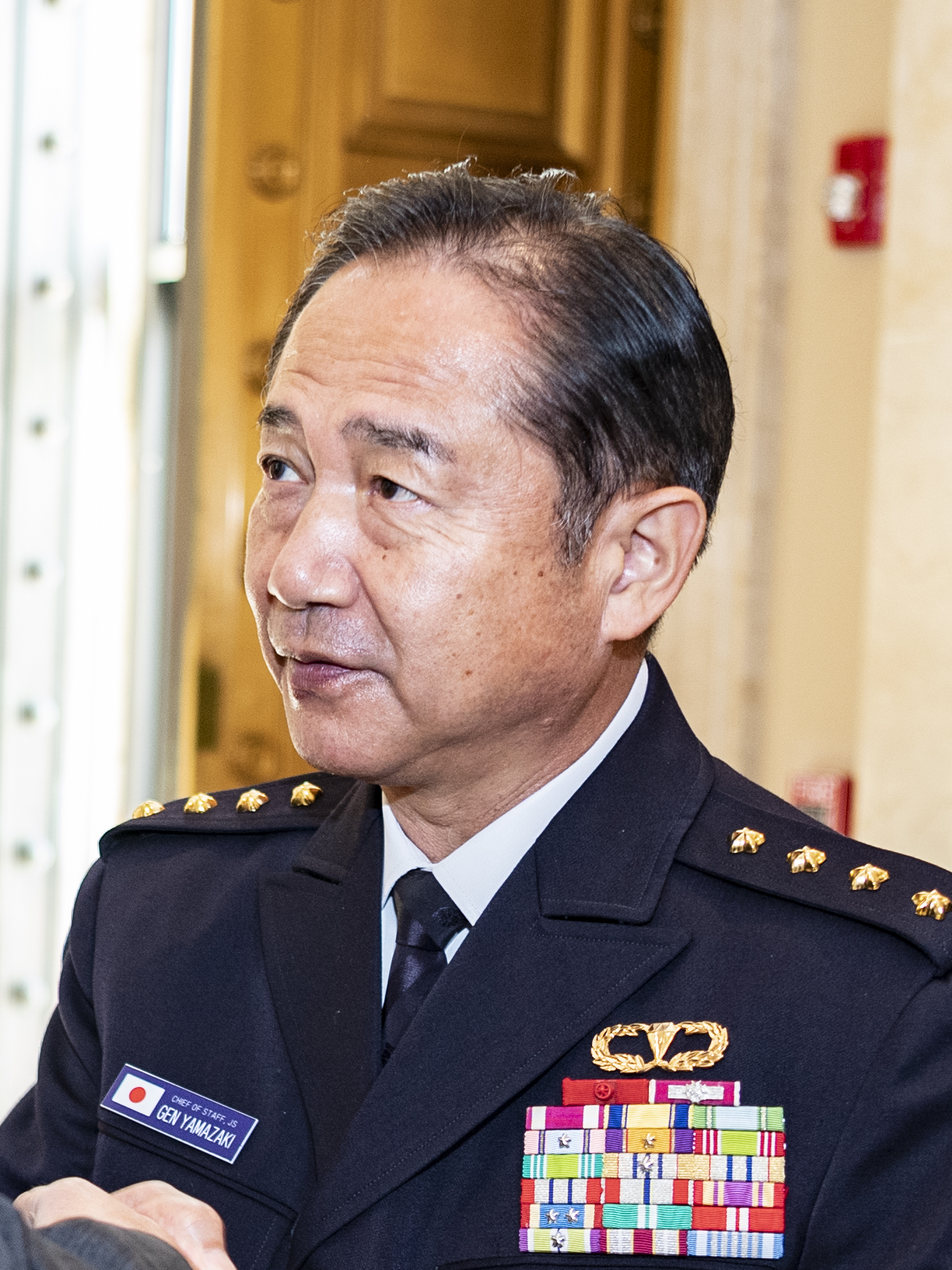
- General Yamazaki in October 2022

Chief of Staff, Joint Staff
- In office April 1, 2019 – March 30, 2023
- Prime Minister: Shinzo Abe; Yoshihide Suga; Fumio Kishida
- Preceded by: Katsutoshi Kawano
- Succeeded by: Yoshihide Yoshida

Chief of the Ground Staff
- In office August 8, 2017 – March 31, 2019
- Prime Minister: Shinzo Abe
- Preceded by: Toshiya Okabe
- Succeeded by: Goro Yuasa

Personal details
- Born: January 16, 1961 (age 65) Nishikatsura, Yamanashi, Japan
- Education: National Defense Academy of Japan

Military service
- Allegiance: Japan
- Branch/service: Japan Ground Self-Defense Force
- Years of service: 1983–2023
- Rank: General
- Commands: Chief of Staff, Joint Staff; Chief of the Ground Staff, JGSDF; Northern Army; Vice Chief of Staff, Joint Staff; 9th Division; Director General, Personnel Department, Ground Staff Office; 4th Engineer Brigade

General Kōji Yamazaki (山崎 幸二, Yamazaki Kōji) is a Japanese retired general who served as the Chief of Staff, Joint Staff of the Japan Self-Defense Forces from April 2019 to March 2023. He previously served as the Chief of the Ground Staff at the JGSDF from August 2017 to March 2019.

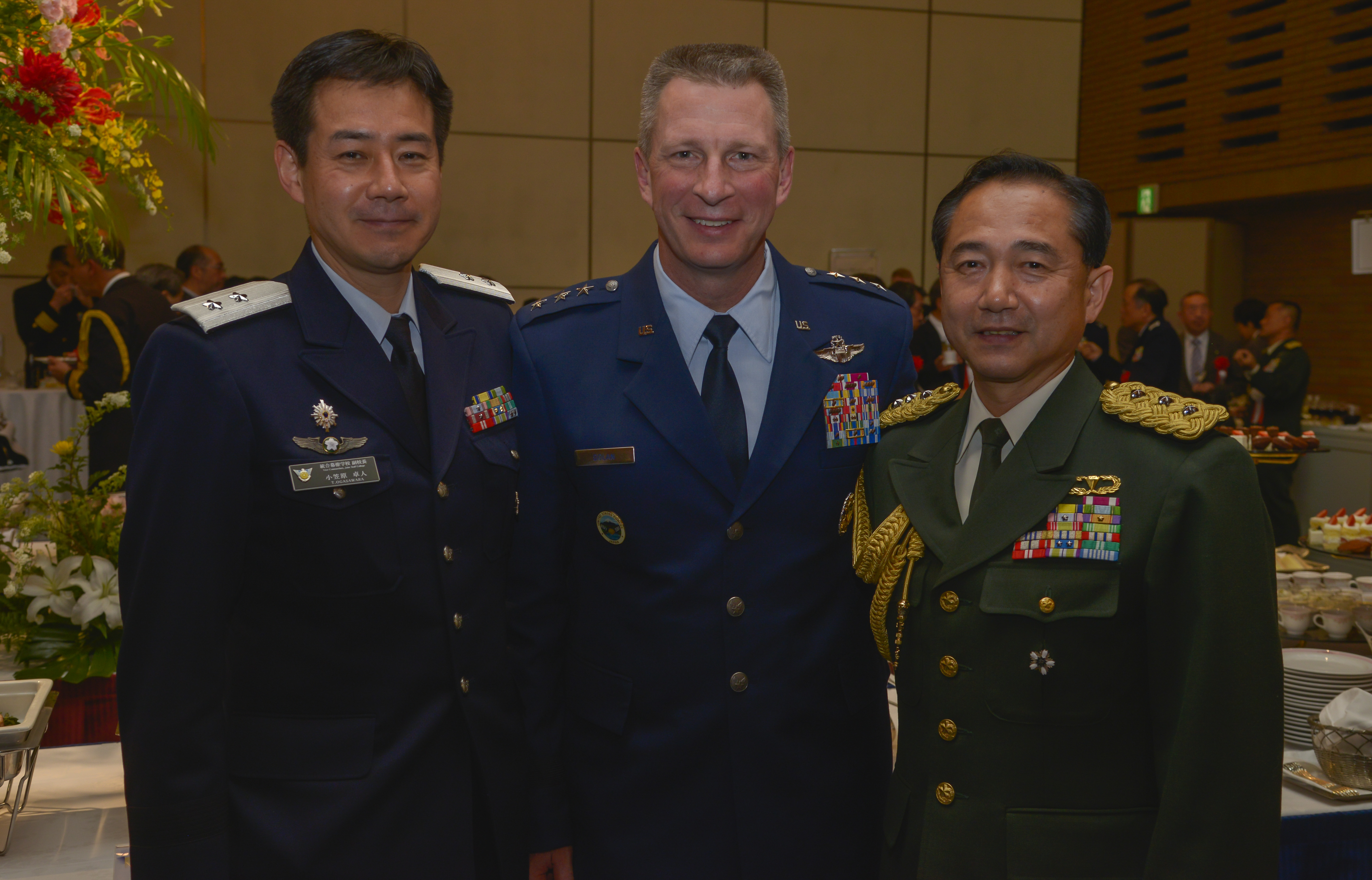
Then-Vice Chief of Staff Lt. Gen. Koji Yamazaki (right), with Maj. Gen. Takuto Ogasawara (left), Joint Staff College Ministry of Defense Vice Commandant, and Lt. Gen. John L. Doland (middle) of United States Forces Japan during the Japan Joint Staff 10th anniversary ceremony at Hotel Grand Hill, Ichigaya, Japan

== Career ==
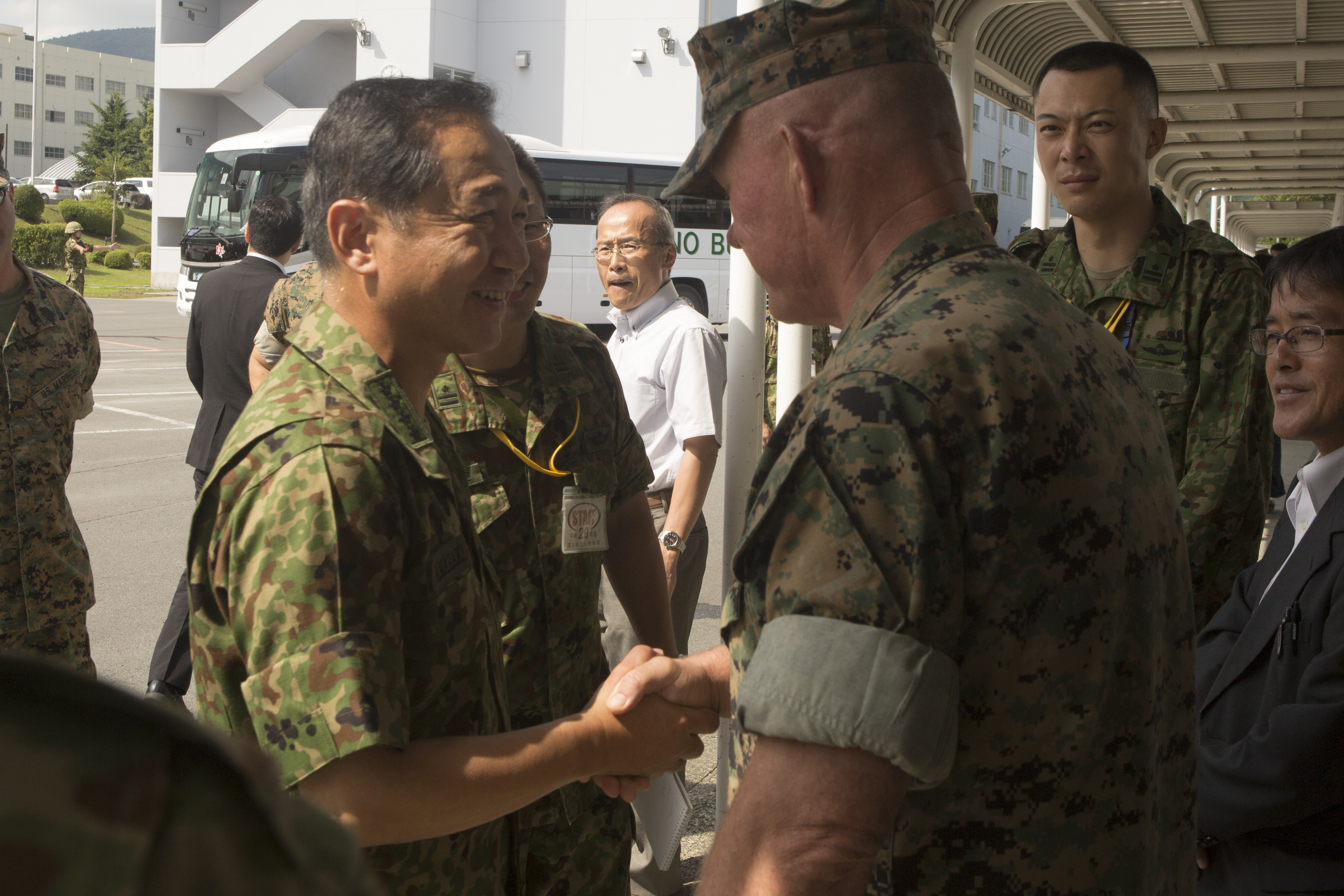
Chief of Staff Koji Yamazaki shakes hands with Lt. Gen. Lawrence D. Nicholson of the III Marine Expeditionary Force (2017)

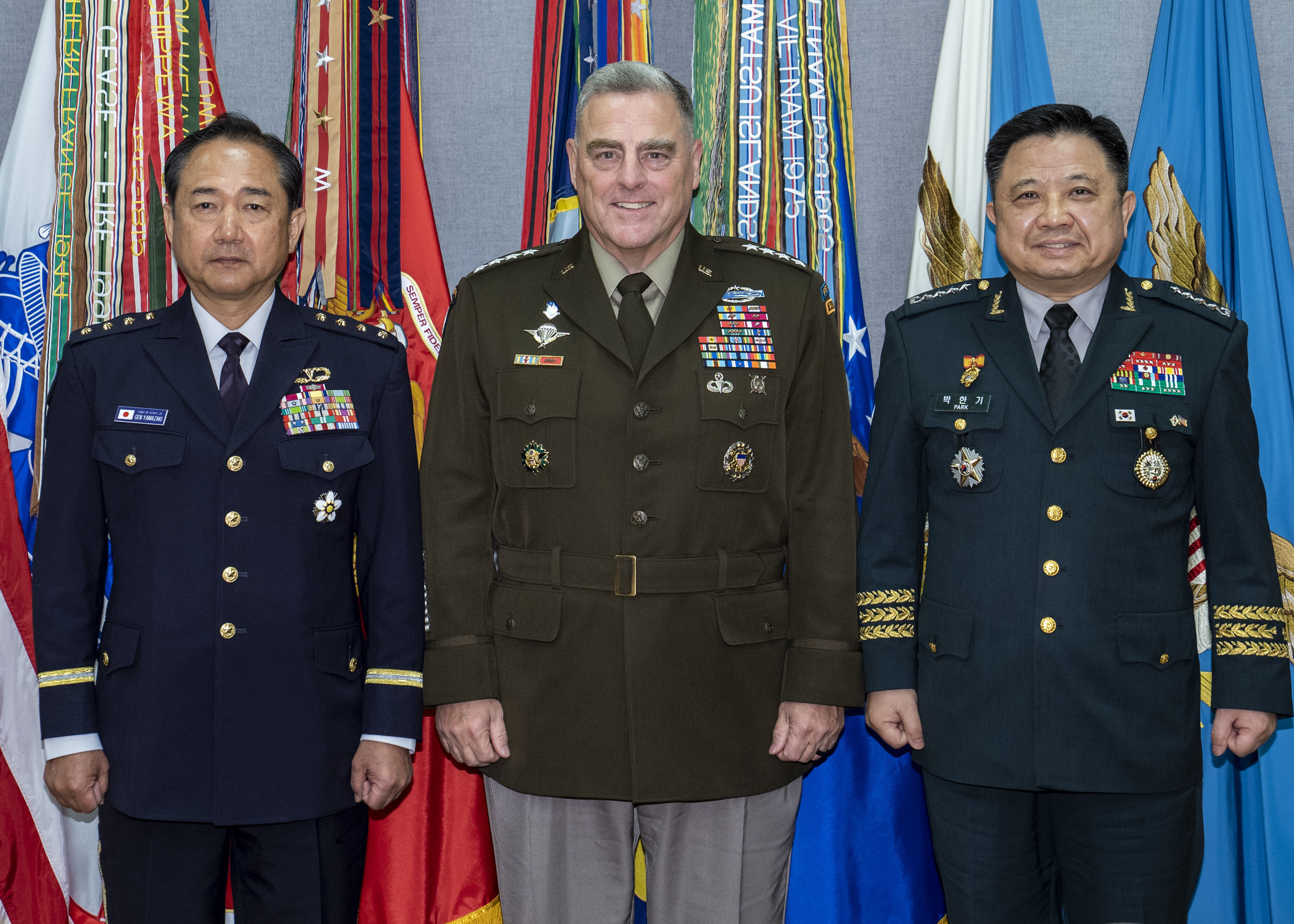
Gen. Koji Yamazaki, with US Chairman of the Joint Chiefs of Staff Gen. Mark A. Milley and South Korean Chairman of the Joint Chiefs of Staff Gen. Park Han-ki at a multilateral meeting at Washington, D.C.

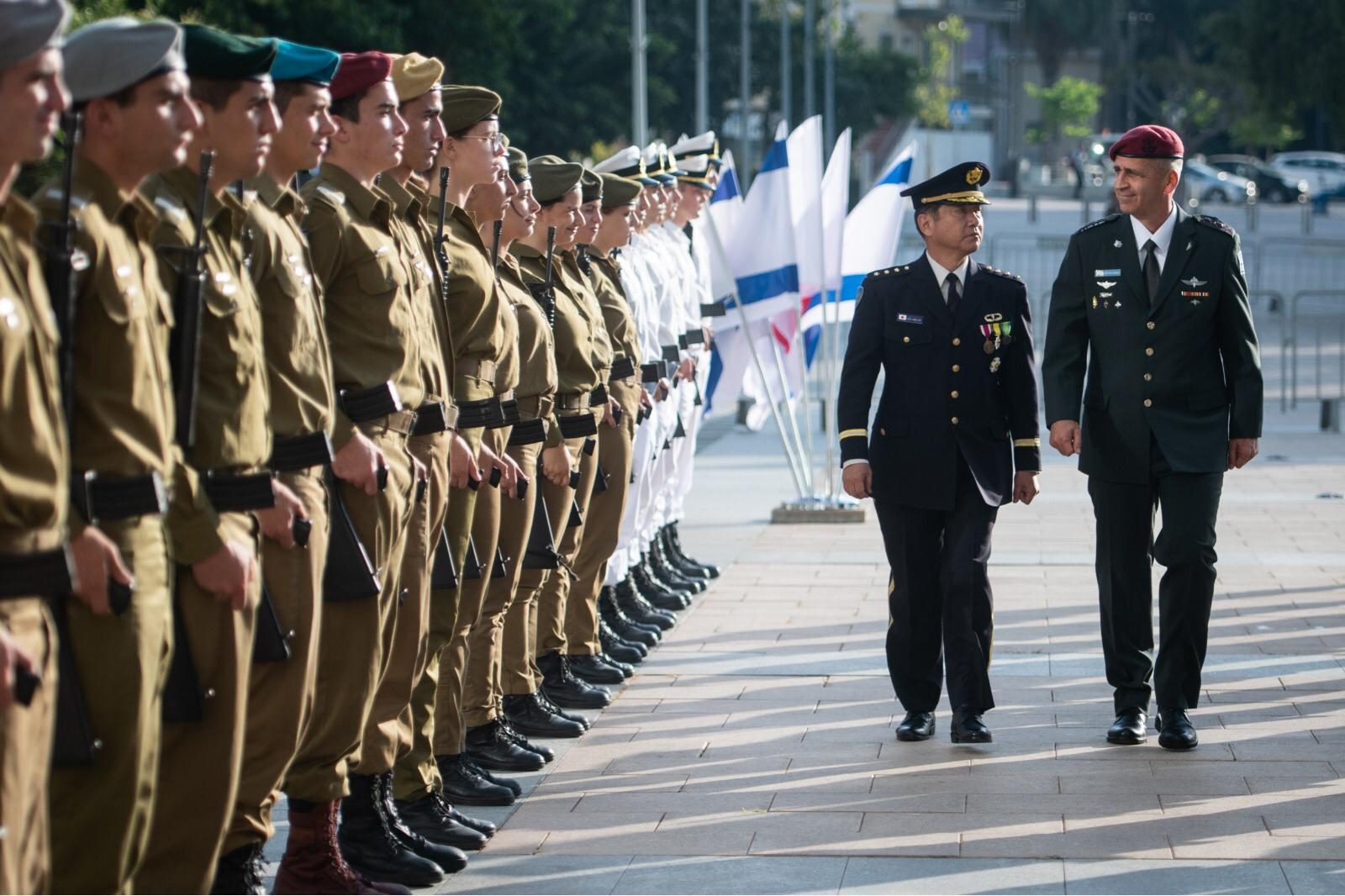
General Yamazaki with Lieutenant General Aviv Kochavi during his visit in Israel (2019)

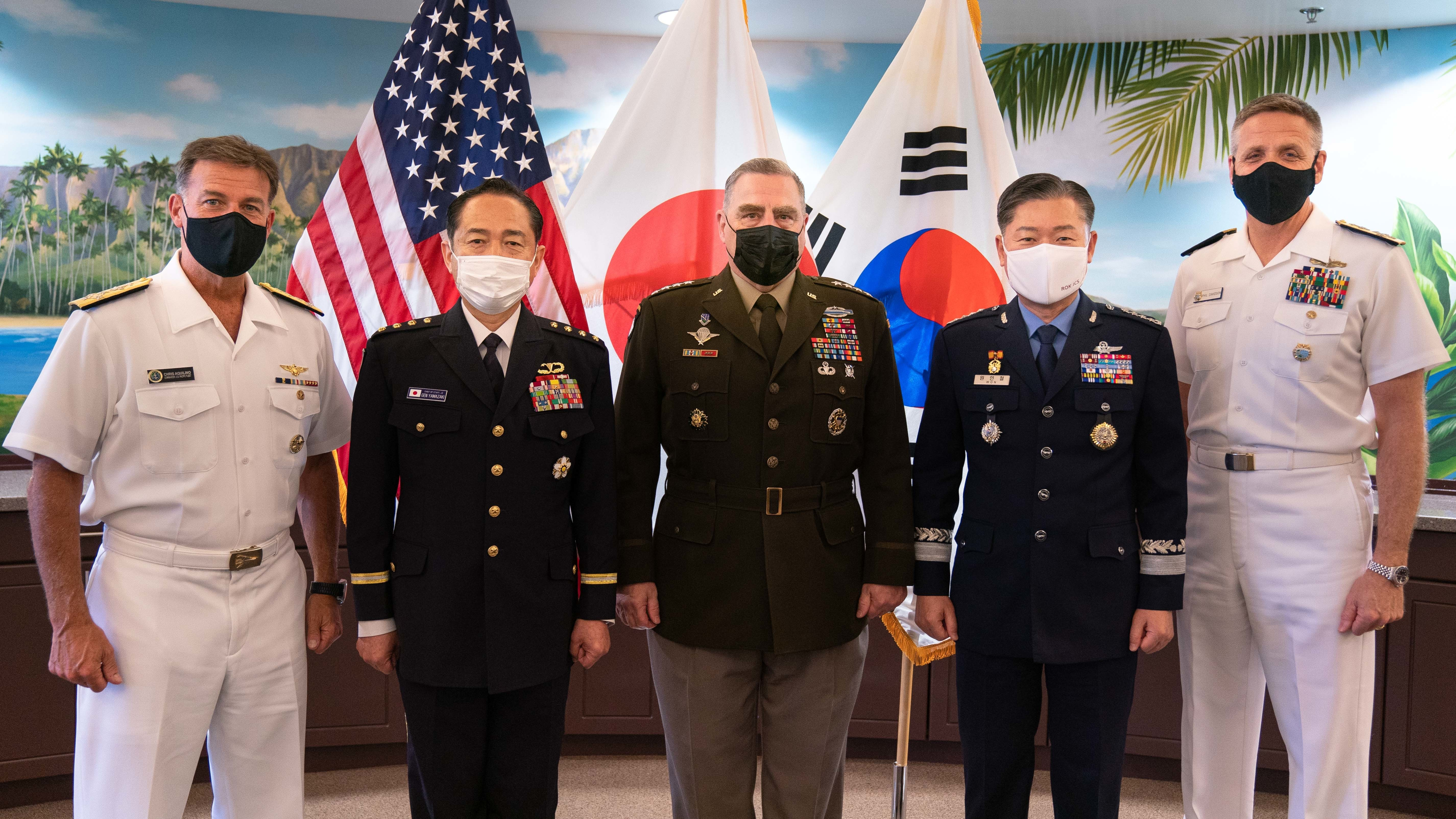
General Yamazaki (2nd from left) meets with US Admirals John C. Aquilino and Philip S. Davidson, US Chairman of the Joint Chiefs of Staff Gen. Mark A. Milley, and South Korean Chairman of the Joint Chiefs of Staff Gen. Won In-choul (2021).

Yamazaki graduated from the 27th semester of the Civil Engineering Department of the National Defense Academy of Japan in March 1983, and started his career as a military engineer, and later held various key positions in the engineering field and staff positions. He also served as the Director of the Logistics Management Division, as commander of the 8th Facility Battalion while subsequently serving as the Facility Manager of the 8th Division (Japan) headquarters and as the Sendai garrison commander under the North Eastern Army in March 2001. Yamazaki was also the commanding General of the 4th Engineer Brigade, based in Camp Okubo in Uji, Kyoto Prefecture in 2008. In August 2002, he served at the Affairs Section of the Ground Staff Office, Human Resources Department; and was named as the chief executive of the 1st Personnel Division of the Personnel Division at the Ground Staff Office.

Yamazaki also attended various courses in the country and abroad, as he completed the Ranger Course of the JGSDF, where he is a qualified member of the Special Forces Group and was awarded the JGSDF Ranger Badge. He also completed the CO-OP program, a joint collaboration project of the JGSDF and the United States Army, Japan in 1995, where he was among the first students to complete the course. Then-Colonel Yamazaki also studied at the National War College in Washington, D.C., where he graduated in April 2005. He served as a researcher at the Ground Self-Defense Force Research Division in August 2006, before being named as the Ground Planning Officer in the Equipment Planning Department 4 months later, in December 2006. He was named as the commander of Facility No. 4 and thereafter served as commander of the Okubo Garrison in Camp Okubo in August 2008, and was named as the Deputy Chief of Staff of the Western Army in June 2010. He became the Director General, Personnel Department of the Ground Staff Office in July 2012. Yamazaki was named as the commander of the 9th Division in August 2014 before becoming the Vice Chief of Staff, Joint Staff in March 2015; and became commander of the Northern Army, based at Sapporo in Hokkaidō in July 2016.

In August 2017, he was appointed 35th Chief of the Ground Staff of the Japan Ground Self-Defense Force, the highest position in the JGSDF after the resignation of General Toshiya Okabe and former Defense Minister Tomomi Inada amidst claims over a cover up scandal within the Ministry of Defense, exposing the danger Japanese peacekeepers were facing in South Sudan. As the Chief of the Ground Staff, he strengthened Japan's strategic partnerships and mutual defense policies in the Asia-Pacific Region, such as strengthening cooperation to the Philippines, where he met with then-Commanding General of the Philippine Army Lieutenant General Macairog Alberto, and the Chief of Staff of the Armed Forces of the Philippines General Benjamin Madrigal Jr.; and the United States, where he met numerous US military generals and continued to enhance the US-Japan military relations.

In April 2019, Yamazaki was appointed by then-Prime Minister Shinzo Abe as the Chief of Staff, Joint Staff, the JSDF's highest position. As the Chief of the Joint Staff, he continued his approach on nourishing Japan's role in the Asia-Pacific and abroad, such as the United States, where he met with Chairman of the Joint Chiefs of Staff General Mark A. Milley; in Israel, where he met Lieutenant General Aviv Kochavi; in South Korea, where he met two Chairmen of the Joint Chiefs of Staff General Park Han-ki and General Won In-choul,; in India, where he met with General Bipin Rawat, and other countries such as Brazil, where he met with the Commander of the Brazilian Army Army General Edson Leal Pujol. General Yamazaki also vowed to strengthen Japan's military capabilities and ensuring that Japan can defend its sovereignty in the East China Sea, particularly in the Senkaku Islands, as the country faces territorial disputes and incursions from China's China Coast Guard, the People's Liberation Army Navy, and the People's Liberation Army Air Force. Yamazaki also vowed to strengthen Japan's presence in the East China Sea and in the South China Sea, and maintain the status quo in securing the Taiwan Strait, as Taiwan and China continues to escalate its tensions amidst a possible invasion of Taiwan by the People's Liberation Army.

On May 19, 2022, General Yamazaki was the first high ranked JSDF officer to attend a NATO Military Chiefs of Defense meeting in Brussels, Belgium, and expanded mutual cooperation efforts between the JSDF and NATO within the global scene. This was also expanded during Yamazaki's meeting with the NATO Chair of the NATO Military Committee Lieutenant Admiral Rob Bauer, where the two leaders collaborated in enhancing Japan's partnership with the NATO alliance. Yamazaki was initially set to retire on 16 January 2022, as he reached his mandatory military retirement age as Chief of Staff, Joint Staff, of 62 years old. Yamazaki's term as Chief of Staff, Joint Staff was extended for 6 months under an ordinance signed by the Ministry of Defense, and is set to last until 15 July 2023. However, his extensions was cut short and he retired from the service on 30 March 2023, where he was replaced by General Yoshihide Yoshida. On 12 July 2023, Yamazaki was appointed to serve as an advisor to the Ministry of Defense, where he replaced Kazuhisa Shimada.

== Biography ==
- March 1983: Graduated from the National Defense Academy of Japan (27th term) and joined the Japan Ground Self-Defense Force
- July 1997 (Heisei 9): Promoted to lieutenant colonel
- March 2001: Commander of the 8th Facility Battalion and Facility Manager of the 8th Division (Japan) headquarters and Sendai garrison commander
- January 2002 (Heisei 14): promoted to colonel
  - August: Affairs Section, Ground Staff Office, Human Resources Department
- August 2003: Leader, 1st Personnel Division, Personnel Division, Ground Staff Staff
- April 2005: With Central Archives (studied in the National War College)
- August 2006: Ground Self-Defense Force Research Division researcher
  - December: Ground Planning Officer, Equipment Planning
- August 1, 2008: Promoted to deputy major general, Commander of Facility No. 4 and Commander of Okubo Garrison
- June 8, 2010: Deputy Chief of Staff for the Western Army (Japan)
- July 26, 2012: Director of Human Resources, Ground Staff
- August 5, 2014: Promotion to lieutenant general, 9th Division (Japan) Commander
- March 30, 2015: Joint Staff Staff Deputy Director
- July 1, 2016: Appointed the 36th General Director of the Northern District
- August 8, 2017: Appointed 35th Chief of Ground Staff
- April 1, 2019: Became the 6th Chief of Staff, Joint Staff.
- January 16, 2023: Term as Chief of Staff, Joint Staff extended for 6 months.
- March 30, 2023: Retired from military service.
- July 12, 2023: Advisor to the Ministry of Defense

== Dates of promotion ==
Insignia	Rank	Date
	Second Lieutenant	March 1983
	Lieutenant Colonel	July 1997
	Colonel	January 2002
	Major General	August 2008
	Lieutenant General	August 2014
	General	August 2017

== Awards ==
- 2 Legion of Merit (Commander), awarded in 2018 and 2023.
- Meritorious Service Medal
- Officer, Legion of Honour
- Honorary Officer of the Order of Australia
- JGSDF Ranger Badge
- Order of Saint Maurice (Peregrinus)

=== Defensive memorial cordons ===
- 2nd Defensive Memorial Cordon
- 10th Defensive Memorial Cordon
- 11th Defensive Memorial Cordon
- 15th Defensive Memorial Cordon with 1 gold cherry blossom
- 16th Defensive Memorial Cordon
- 18th Defensive Memorial Cordon
- 19th Defensive Memorial Cordon
- 20th Defensive Memorial Cordon
- 22nd Defensive Memorial Cordon
- 23rd Defensive Memorial Cordon
- 25th Defensive Memorial Cordon
- 26th Defensive Memorial Cordon with 2 silver cherry blossoms
- 32nd Defensive Memorial Cordon
- 33rd Defensive Memorial Cordon
- 37th Defensive Memorial Cordon
- 40th Defensive Memorial Cordon
- 41st Defensive Memorial Cordon

Military offices
Preceded by Katsutoshi Kawano	Chief of Staff, Joint Staff; April 1, 2019-March 30, 2023	Succeeded by Yoshihide Yoshida
Preceded by Toshiya Okabe	Chief of the Ground Staff; August 8, 2017-March 31, 2019	Succeeded by Gorō Yuasa
