= Shigeru Iwasaki =

Japanese military officer (born 1953)

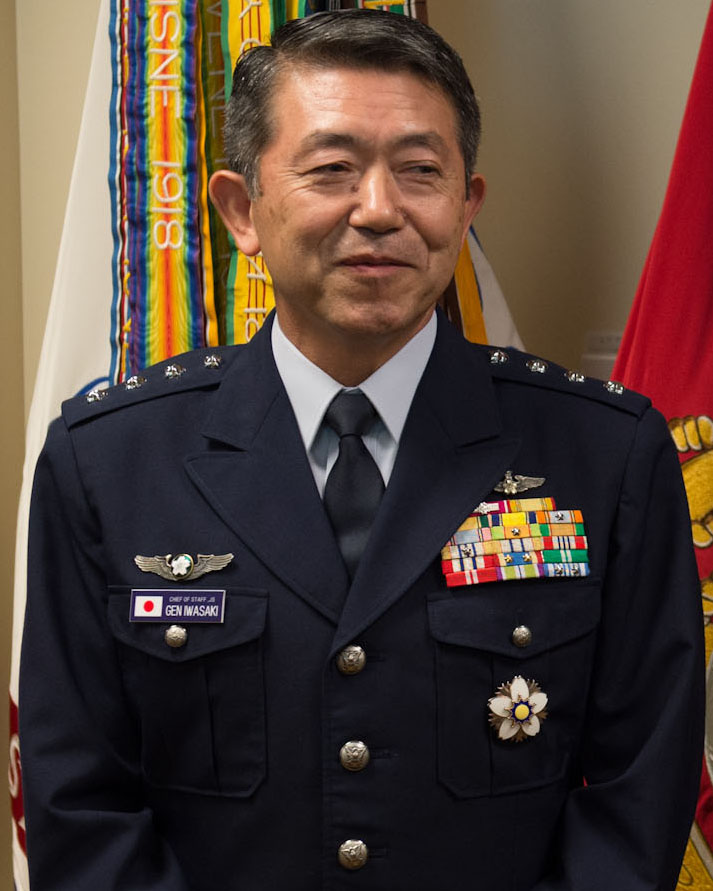
- General Iwasaki in August 2012
- Born: February 3, 1953 (age 73); Morioka, Japan
- Military career
- Allegiance: Japan
- Branch: Japan Air Self-Defense Force
- Service years: 1975 - 2014
- Rank: General
- Commands: Chief of Staff, Joint Staff; Chief of the Air Staff, JASDF; Air Defense Command; 2nd Air Wing; 201st Tactical Fighter Squadron
- Awards: Order of the Sacred Treasure (Grand Cordon); Legion of Merit, Commander’s Degree; Order of Australia

Shigeru Iwasaki (岩崎茂, Iwasaki Shigeru; born February 3, 1953) is a Japanese military officer who was the 4th Chief of Staff of the Joint Staff of the Japan Self-Defense Forces. A four-star General from the Japan Air Self-Defense Force, Iwasaki became the highest-ranking military officer in Japan and ranked third in the overall chain of command (after the Prime Minister and the Minister of Defense).

== Career ==
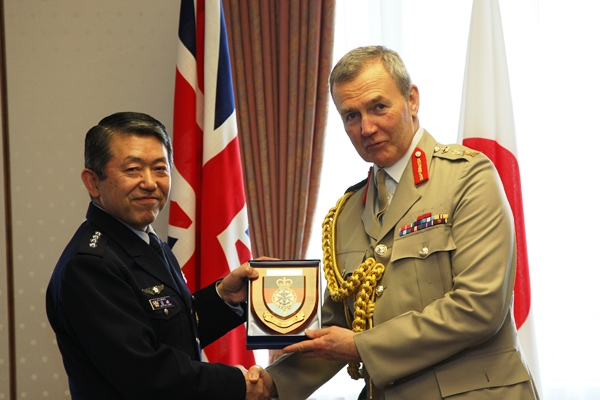
Gen. Iwasaki with Gen. Nick Houghton exchanging gifts in 2014.

Iwasaki was born and raised in Iwate Prefecture and attended Morioka Third High School. He attended the National Defense Academy of Japan, graduating into the Japan Air Self-Defense Force in 1975. He is trained to fly the McDonnell Douglas F-15 Eagle, Japan's primary jet fighter.

In August 1991, then-Lieutenant Colonel Iwasaki took command of the 201st Tactical Fighter Squadron. In December 1997, then-Colonel Iwasaki took command of the 7th Air Wing. In January 2001, then-Major General Iwasaki took command of the 2nd Air Wing.

In December 2010, General Iwasaki became the 31st Chief of Staff of the Japan Air Self-Defense Force. As Chief of Staff, he spearheaded the effort to procure the fifth generation Lockheed Martin F-35 Lightning II.

In January 2012, General Iwasaki was promoted to be Chief of Staff of the Joint Staff, becoming the highest-ranking official in the Japan Self-Defense Forces. He replaced GSDF General Ryuichi Ariki, and his Vice Chief of Staff was Kōichi Isobe. He has presided over a number of significant national security issues, including the renewed Senkaku Islands dispute and the possible revision of Article 9 of the Japanese Constitution (following the Liberal Democratic Party's landslide electoral victory in December 2012).

In 2015 he was appointed an honorary Officer in the Military Division of the Order of Australia, for his role in enhancing defence engagement and practical co-operation between Australia and Japan.

In March 2025, he received the position of an unpaid consultant to the Executive Yuan, Cabinet of the Taiwanese government, which led to an official protest from China against external interference in Taiwan. On December 15, he was sanctioned by the Chinese government.

== Awards ==
- Grand Cordon of the Order of the Sacred Treasure (1st class)
- Legion of Merit (Commander)
- - Honorary Officer of the Order of Australia (Military Division)

=== Defensive memorial cordons ===
- 5th Defensive Memorial Cordon
- 2nd Defensive Memorial Cordon
- 3rd Defensive Memorial Cordon
- 9th Defensive Memorial Cordon with 1 silver cherry blossom
- 11th Defensive Memorial Cordon
- 13th Defensive Memorial Cordon
- 14th Defensive Memorial Cordon
- 19th Defensive Memorial Cordon with 1 silver cherry blossom
- 20th Defensive Memorial Cordon
- 21st Defensive Memorial Cordon
- 22nd Defensive Memorial Cordon
- 26th Defensive Memorial Cordon with 2 gold cherry blossoms
- 32nd Defensive Memorial Cordon
- 33rd Defensive Memorial Cordon
- 36th Defensive Memorial Cordon
- 41st Defensive Memorial Cordon with 2 silver cherry blossoms

Military offices
Preceded by Ryoichi Oriki	Chief of Staff of the Joint Staff; Japan Self-Defense Forces; 2012–2014	Succeeded by Katsutoshi Kawano
Preceded by Kenichiro Hokazono	Chief of Staff; Japan Air Self-Defense Force; 2010–2012	Succeeded by Haruhiko Kataoka
