= Katsutoshi Kawano =

Japanese admiral (born 1954)

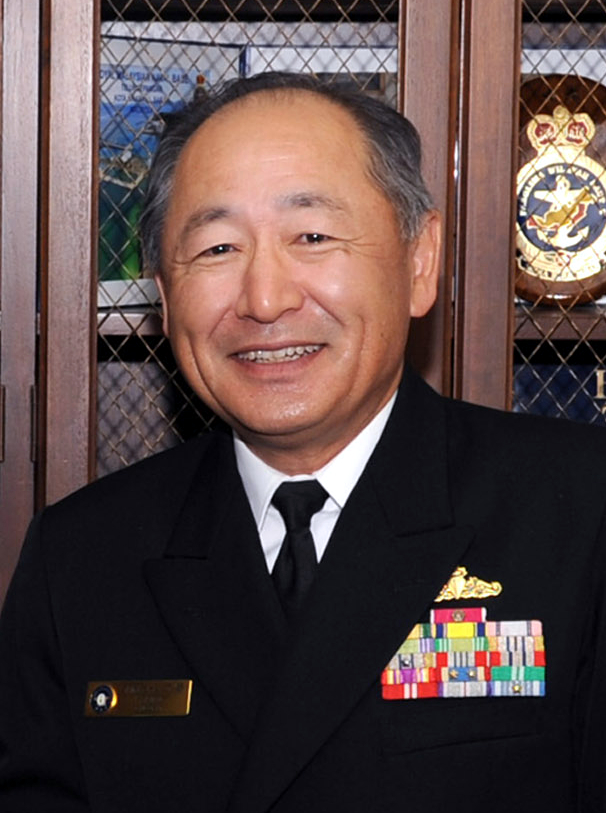
- in Yokosuka City, Kanagawa Prefecture on October 13, 2011
- Nickname: Doraemon (Note: Reportedly a nickname used for Kawano by colleagues, per Sankei Shimbun's profile of him at the time of his appointment as Chief of Staff, Joint Staff.)
- Born: November 28, 1954 (age 71); Hakodate, Hokkaido, Japan
- Allegiance: Japan
- Branch: Japan Maritime Self-Defense Force
- Service years: 1977–2019
- Rank: Admiral
- Commands: Chief of Staff, Joint Staff; Chief of Maritime Staff; Self-Defense Fleet; Vice Chief of Staff, Joint Staff; Commander, Mine Warfare Force; Chief of Staff, MSDF Sasebo District; Commanding Officer, JS Ōyodo
- Awards: Order of Abdulaziz Al Saud; Legion of Merit, Officer's Degree; Legion of Merit, Commander's Degree; Honorary Officer of the Order of Australia (Military Division)

Katsutoshi Kawano (河野 克俊, Kawano Katsutoshi; born 28 November 1954) is a retired Japanese admiral who served as the 5th Chief of Staff, Joint Staff of the Japan Self-Defense Forces from 2014 to 2019 — the longest tenure of anyone who has held that specific post since its creation. Prior to his appointment, he was Chief of Staff of the Japan Maritime Self-Defense Force (JMSDF), Japan's maritime military service.

== Early life and education ==
Kawano was born in Hakodate, Hokkaido, on 28 November 1954, the fourth of five children. According to his own account, his father, Katsuji Kawano, served as a junior officer in the Imperial Japanese Navy during World War II, including as an engineering officer aboard the submarine I-16 at the time of the attack on Pearl Harbor. After the war, Katsuji continued his naval career in the JMSDF, eventually reaching the rank of rear admiral and commanding the JMSDF's Hakodate sub-area activity. Two months before Katsutoshi was born, Katsuji took part in rescue and relief operations following the sinking of the JNR train ferry Tōya Maru during a typhoon. After his father's retirement, the family relocated to Ibaraki, Osaka Prefecture.

Kawano attended Kasugaoka High School and, influenced by his father, sought to become a naval officer. He graduated from the National Defense Academy in March 1977 with a degree in mechanical engineering, reportedly ranking first within his department (the Academy has no institution-wide class ranking, as it is organized by department), and entered the JMSDF the same month. He was commissioned as an ensign in March 1978, also reportedly graduating top of his class at the JMSDF Officer Candidate School. In the late 1980s, around the time of his promotion from lieutenant to lieutenant commander, he undertook graduate study in international relations at the University of Tsukuba.

== Career ==
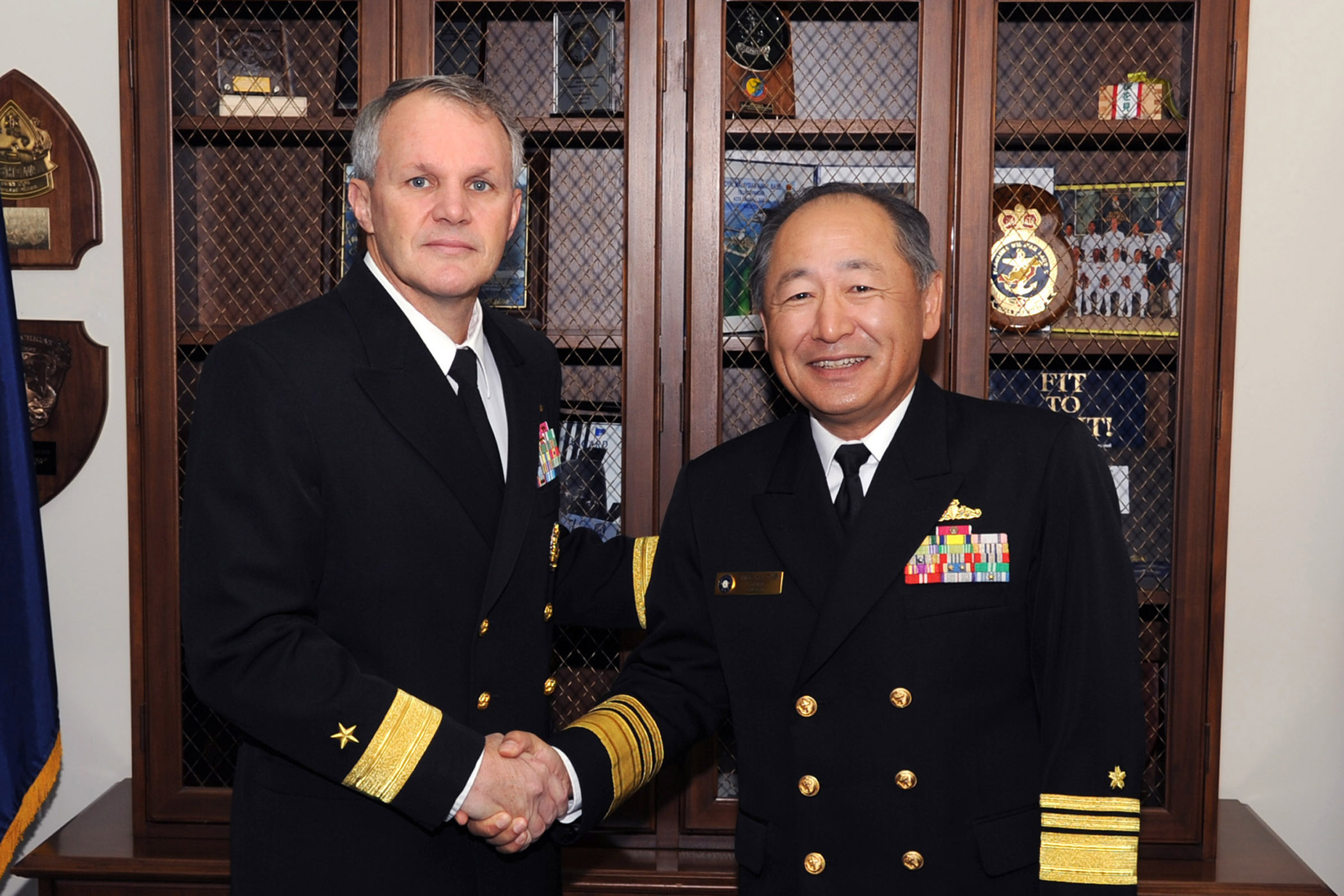
Chief of Staff Katsutoshi Kawano and Then-Rear Admiral Phillip G. Sawyer, Commander of the Submarine Group 7, in Yokosuka City, Kanagawa Prefecture on October 13, 2011.

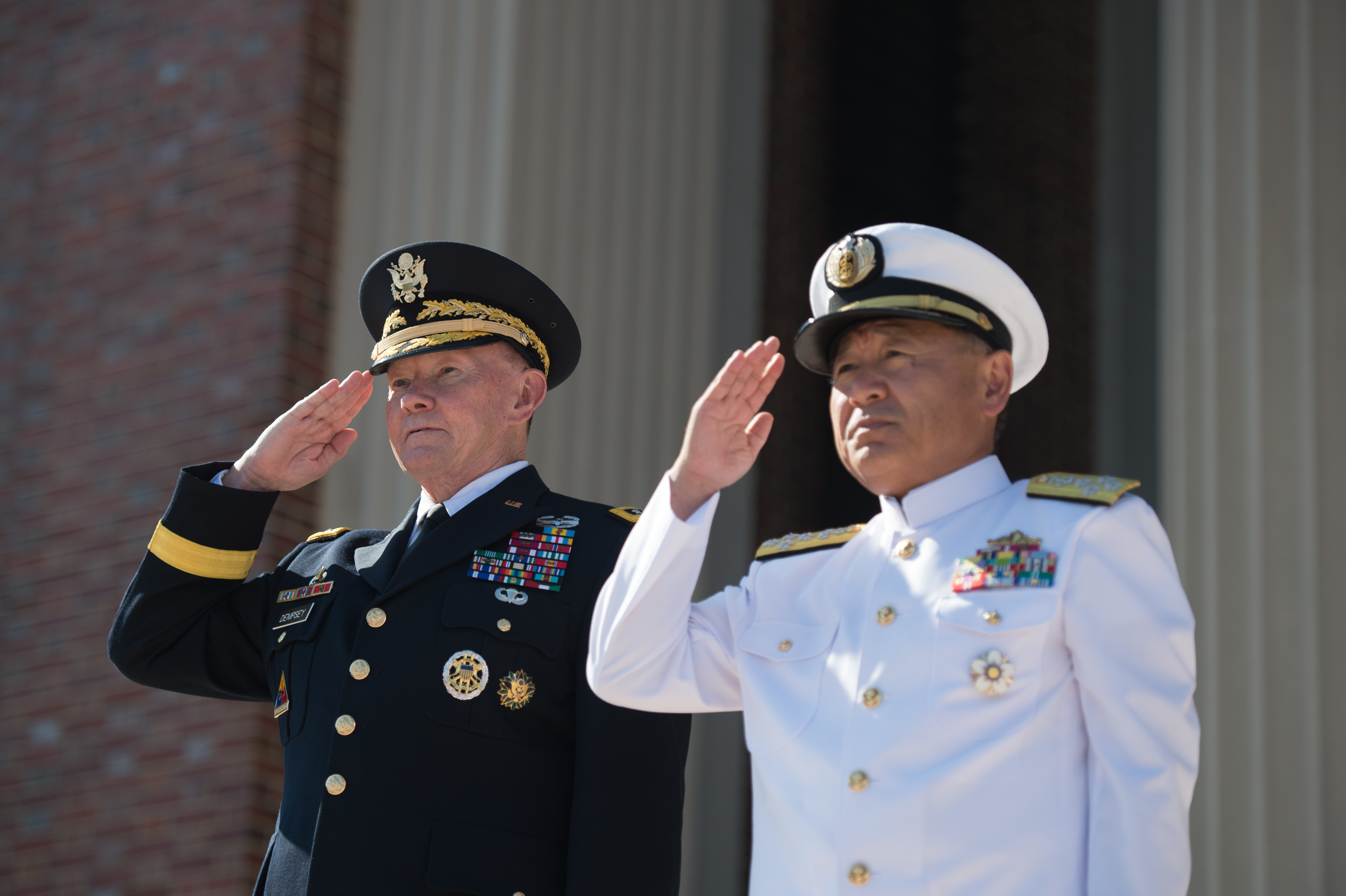
Chief of Staff Katsutoshi Kawano with Martin Dempsey (left), Chairman of the Joint Chiefs of Staff (at the Fort Lesley J. McNair on July 16, 2015)

From August 1992 to August 1993, then-Commander Kawano served as the second commanding officer of the destroyer escort Ōyodo. While Commander of the 3rd Escort Flotilla from December 2002, he served as commander of the 6th dispatch of the Indian Ocean support force, directing refuelling operations for coalition forces following the September 11 attacks.

In 2008, while serving as Director of the Defense Department at the Maritime Staff Office, Kawano was among the officials who gave initial public statements about the collision between the destroyer JS Atago (DDG-177) and the fishing vessel Seitoku Maru off Chiba Prefecture on 19 February, in which two fishermen were killed. Kawano was not in Atago's chain of command; the ship belonged to the 3rd Escort Division of the Escort Fleet's 3rd Escort Flotilla. At a press briefing shortly after the collision, Kawano stated that Atago's lookout had sighted the fishing boat's lights two minutes before impact; days later, the Ministry of Defense revised this account, stating the lights had in fact been sighted around twelve minutes beforehand, prompting sustained media criticism of the ministry's and JMSDF's handling and disclosure of the incident. According to Japanese Wikipedia's account of his career, Kawano's transfer to command of the Mine Warfare Force in March 2008 has been described as connected to the fallout from the incident. (Note: This characterization comes from a tertiary source rather than a primary news account explicitly stating the transfer was disciplinary in nature; it is included with that caveat rather than as a settled fact.)

Kawano went on to become Chief of Staff of the Sasebo District, then Chief of Staff of the Self-Defense Fleet Command; in the latter role, he was among the senior officers coordinating the JSDF response to the 2011 Tōhoku earthquake and tsunami. He became Vice Chief of Staff of the Joint Staff Council in 2010, and on 5 August 2011 became Commander of the Self-Defense Fleet, succeeding Kenichi Kuramoto. He was succeeded there in 2012 by Yasushi Matsushita.

On 26 July 2012, Kawano was promoted to full Admiral and became Chief of Staff of the JMSDF, replacing outgoing admiral Masahiko Sugimoto. In that role, he was closely involved in the JMSDF's response to the ongoing Senkaku Islands dispute.

On 14 October 2014, Kawano was appointed by then-Prime Minister Shinzo Abe as Chief of Staff, Joint Staff. He was retained beyond the JSDF's normal retirement age of 62 through three separate extensions of his mandatory retirement date — the first JSDF Chief of Staff, Joint Staff ever granted more than one such extension — ultimately serving four and a half years before being succeeded by Kōji Yamazaki on 31 March 2019. Commentary at the time linked the extensions to heightened regional security tensions, including the 2017–18 North Korea crisis.

=== 2017 remarks on constitutional revision ===
In May 2017, Prime Minister Abe proposed in a newspaper interview that Article 9 of Japan's constitution be amended to explicitly reference the Self-Defense Forces while leaving its first two paragraphs unchanged. Three weeks later, at a press conference at the Foreign Correspondents' Club of Japan, Kawano was asked for his views. He prefaced his answer by saying that, as a matter of high politics, it was "not appropriate" for him to comment in his official capacity, but added: "speaking as an individual Self-Defense Forces member, if the Self-Defense Forces were to be explicitly written into the constitution in some form, I would be very grateful."

The remark drew criticism from some media outlets and opposition politicians, on the grounds it risked conflicting with the Self-Defense Forces Act's requirement of political neutrality for JSDF personnel, and potentially with Article 99 of the constitution, which obliges public officials to respect and uphold it. On 24 May, Chief Cabinet Secretary Yoshihide Suga stated that the remark had been expressed as Kawano's personal opinion and posed no problem under the Self-Defense Forces Act. The following day, the Japanese Communist Party held a press conference calling for Kawano's dismissal, arguing the remark violated public officials' constitutional duty to respect the constitution. A formal question was also submitted in the House of Councillors regarding the remark; the government's written response stated it did not consider the comment problematic.

== After retirement ==
After retiring, Kawano became an advisor to the Ministry of Defense and has since served as a commentator for the Nippon TV group and as an advisor to several companies. He has continued to comment publicly on Japanese security policy, including constitutional revision and deterrence in the context of a potential Taiwan contingency.

== Awards and honors ==
- – Order of Abdulaziz Al Saud (Saudi Arabia)
- – Legion of Merit (Officer's Degree and Commander's Degree, on separate occasions)
- - Honorary Officer of the Order of Australia (Military Division)

=== Defensive memorial cordons ===
Kawano received the following Defensive memorial cordons during his career:

- 2nd Cordon
- 3rd Cordon
- 11th Cordon
- 17th Cordon
- 18th Cordon
- 19th Cordon
- 20th Cordon
- 21st Cordon
- 22nd Cordon
- 25th Cordon
- 26th Cordon, with 2 gold cherry blossoms
- 32nd Cordon
- 33rd Cordon
- 36th Cordon
- 37th Cordon
- 38th Cordon
- 40th Cordon
- 41st Cordon

== Dates of promotion ==
Promotions
Insignia	Rank	Date
	Ensign	March 1977
	Commander	July 1991
	Captain	January 1, 1996
	Rear Admiral	August 1, 2002
	Vice Admiral	November 7, 2008
	Admiral	July 26, 2012

Intermediate ranks between ensign and commander (e.g. lieutenant junior grade, lieutenant, lieutenant commander) are omitted here because the cited source does not give dates for them individually, not because they did not occur.

== Notes ==
Military offices
Preceded by Shigeru Iwasaki	Chief of Staff, Joint Staff; October 14, 2014-March 31, 2019	Succeeded by Kōji Yamazaki
Preceded by Masahiko Sugimoto	Chief of the Maritime Staff; July 26, 2012-October 13, 2014	Succeeded by Tomohisa Takei
