= Ken'ichirō Nagumo =

Japanese military general

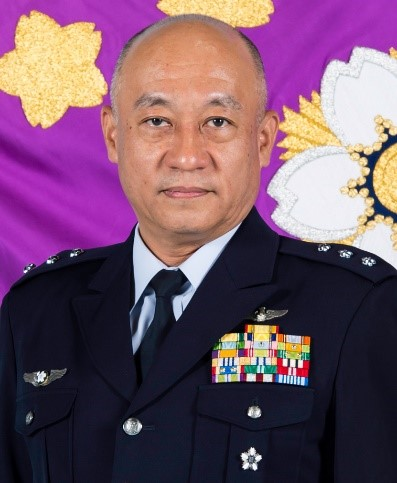
- Native name: 南雲憲一郎
- Born: 2 October 1965 (age 60); Yamagata Prefecture, Japan
- Allegiance: Japan
- Branch: Japan Air Self-Defense Force
- Service years: 1989–2026

General Ken'ichirō Nagumo (南雲憲一郎, Kenichiro Nagumo) (2 October 1965) is a retired Japanese military general who served as the first Joint Operations Commander of the Japan Self-Defense Forces.

== Biography ==
Nagumo was born in Yonezawa, Yamagata Prefecture. In 1989, he graduated from the National Defense Academy and joined the Air Self-Defense Force. After joining the Air Self-Defense Force, he served as an F-15 fighter pilot and was responsible for airspace anti-airspace incursion measures.

On August 25, 2020, he was promoted to the rank of General and appointed Commander of the Western Air Defense Force.

March 30, 2023, he was appointed the Deputy Chief of Staff, Joint Staff.

On February 15, 2024, the Chief of Staff, Joint Staff Yoshihide Yoshida was hospitalized due to overwork, so Nagumo took over his position.

At a cabinet meeting held on March 11, 2025, it was decided to appoint Nagumo as the first commander of the Joint Operations Command, effective March 24.

Nagumo retired in March 2026.

== Personal ==
- His grandfather is Major General Shin'ichirō Nagumo.
- Read Ryōtarō Shiba's "Saka no Ue no Kumo" and aspired to become a Self-Defense official.
- Admiral Chūichi Nagumo of the former Navy, who commanded the attack on Pearl Harbor and other operations, was also born in Yonezawa, Yamagata Prefecture. His TAC name, a nickname for pilots, was also "CHUJYO," but he denies any blood relationship. However, according to "Shichisei: Manchukuogun Nikkei Gunkan Shichisei Shi (Nansei Kai, 1984)"（『七星: 満洲国軍日系軍官七期生誌』七星会、1984年）, Major General Nagumo and Admiral Nagumo are listed as cousins.
- Hiroaki Uchikura, the 37th Chief of Staff, Air Self Defense Force, was two years his senior at the National Defense Academy, and they served together at Chitose Air Base and other bases. Uchikura described Nagumo as "a motivational commander who ignites the spirit of his subordinates. He is both a hot-blooded man and a calm risk manager".
