= Kōichi Isobe =

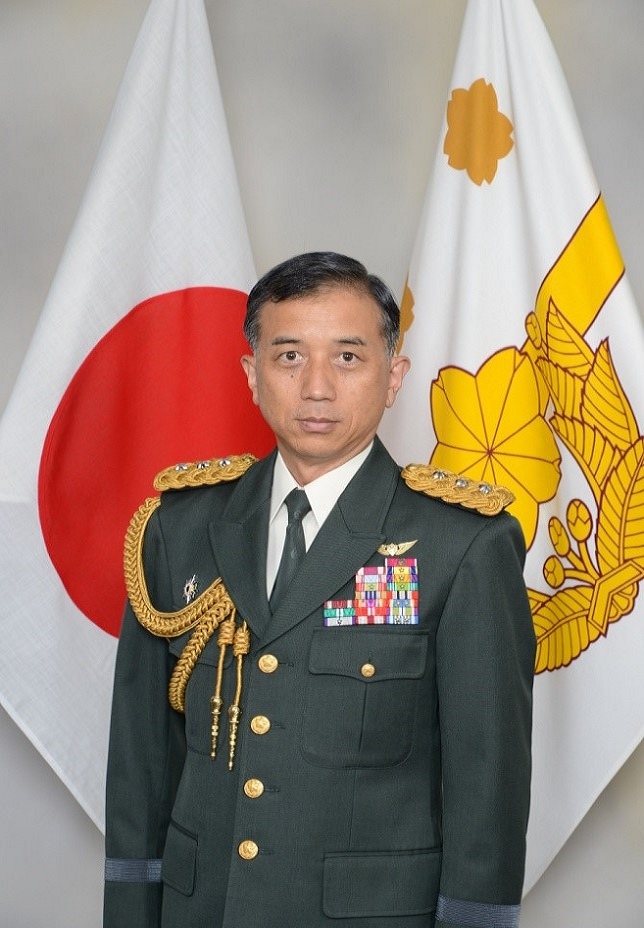
- LTG Kōichi Isobe
- Born: January 1958 (age 68); Tokushima Prefecture
- Military career
- Allegiance: Japan
- Branch: Japan Ground Self-Defense Force
- Service years: 1980–2015
- Rank: Lieutenant General
- Commands: Eastern Army (Japan), and JTF Tsubaki Rescue (Oct. 2013). Vice Chief of Staff, Joint Staff. 7th Division (Japan) Vice Commander, Central Readiness Force.
- Awards: Legion of Merit and Meritorious Service Medal

Kōichi Isobe (磯部晃一, Kōichi Isobe; born January 1958) is a retired lieutenant general in the Japan Ground Self-Defense Force. He retired from active duty in August 2015, after thirty-five years of service in the Japan Self-Defense Forces.

He currently serves as a strategic advisor to Kawasaki Heavy Industries. He also serves as senior fellow of Harvard University Asia Center and at the Asia Pacific Initiative Foundation.

== Early life and education ==
General Kōichi Isobe was born in 1958 in Tokushima Prefecture. He attended the National Defense Academy of Japan (the SDF joint military academy) and was commissioned as a second lieutenant of the GSDF in 1981. He was a helicopter aviator who flew OH-6 Cayuse and Ch-47 Chinook helicopters. After graduation from Command & General Staff College, GSDF, he served at Japan-US Security Affairs Division, Ministry of Foreign Affairs (Japan) (August 1989 – August 1991). He also served various staff appointments in General Staff Office, GSDF. His command positions included 9th Division Aviation Squadron, 7th Division, and the Eastern Army.

General Isobe earned a Master of Military Studies at the Marine Corps University in 1996. His master's degree paper earned the Brigadier A. W. Hammett Award. He also received a Master of Science in national resource strategy at the National Defense University (NDU), Fort McNair, in 2003.

== Career ==
General Kōichi Isobe was the 37th Commander of the Eastern Army in his final two years of service. The Eastern Army's area of responsibility covers the Tokyo Metropolitan Government and ten prefectures, and nearly half of the Japanese total population and GDP. During his tenure, he deployed more than 100,000 JSDF personnel in three major disasters: the October 2013 Pacific typhoon season flood and landslide on Izu Ōshima, February 2014's record-breaking snowfall in the Kantō region, and the September eruption of Mount Ontake.

Unique among JGSDF general officers, General Kōichi Isobe experienced Joint Staff senior positions twice: Director J-5 (July 2009 – August 2011) and Vice Chief of Staff (August 2012 – August 2013). He played as a linchpin of Japan-US military coordination via Operation Tomodachi during the Great East Japan Earthquake of March 2011 whilst serving as J-5. As Vice Chief, Joint Staff, he initiated the Amphibious Warfare Study Forum among the JSDF three-service senior leaders.

== Awards ==

Legion of Merit

Meritorious Service Medal

== Publications ==
- "The Amphibious Operations Brigade -The establishment of the JGSDF brigade and its challenges," Marine Corps Gazette, February 2017, Vol.101 No.2.
- "An Insider's View of the History, Evolution, and Prospects of Japan's Amphibious Rapid Deployment Brigade," U.S.-Japan Alliance Conference -Meeting the Challenge of Amphibious Operations-, The Rand Corporation, 2018.

Military offices
Preceded by Kiyofumi Iwata	Vice Chief of Staff of the Joint Staff Office; Japan Self-Defense Forces; 2012-2013	Succeeded by Gorō Matsumura
