= Haruhiko Kataoka =

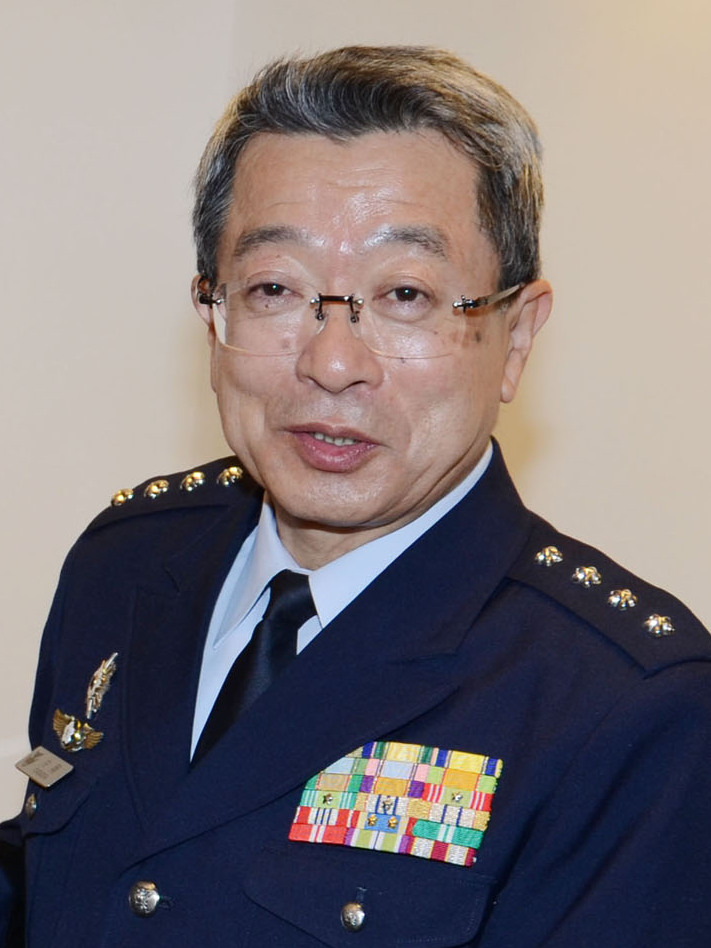
- Kataoka in 2012
- Born: April 1952 (age 74); Tokyo
- Military career
- Allegiance: Japan
- Branch: Japan Air Self-Defense Force
- Service years: 1976-2013
- Rank: General

Haruhiko Kataoka (片岡晴彦, Haruhiko Kataoka; born April 1952) was the 32nd Chief of Staff of the Japan Air Self-Defense Force, the de facto air force of Japan.

== Career ==
Kataoka was born and raised in Tokyo. He attended the National Defense Academy of Japan, graduating into the Japan Air Self-Defense Force in 1976. He has held numerous command positions in his career, including within the 4th Air Wing and the Air Staff Office.

In 2001, then-Major General Kataoka took command of the JASDF Air Development and Test Command. One year later, he took command of the 8th Air Wing.

In 2007, then-Lieutenant General Kataoka took command of the JASDF Central Air Defense Force. Two years later, in 2009, he took command of JASDF Air Training Command. In 2010, he became commander of Air Defence Command. He served in this position at the time of the 2011 Tōhoku earthquake and tsunami and subsequently became the Air Component Commander of Joint Task Force - Tohoku.

In January 2012, he became the Chief of Staff of the Japan Air Self-Defense Force, replacing Shigeru Iwasaki who was promoted to be Chief of Staff of the Joint Staff Council.

Military offices
Preceded by Shigeru Iwasaki	Chief of Staff; Japan Air Self-Defense Force; 2012-2013	Succeeded by Harukazu Saito
