= Yoshihide Yoshida =

General of the Japan Ground Self-Defense Force (JGSDF)

- 吉田 圭秀
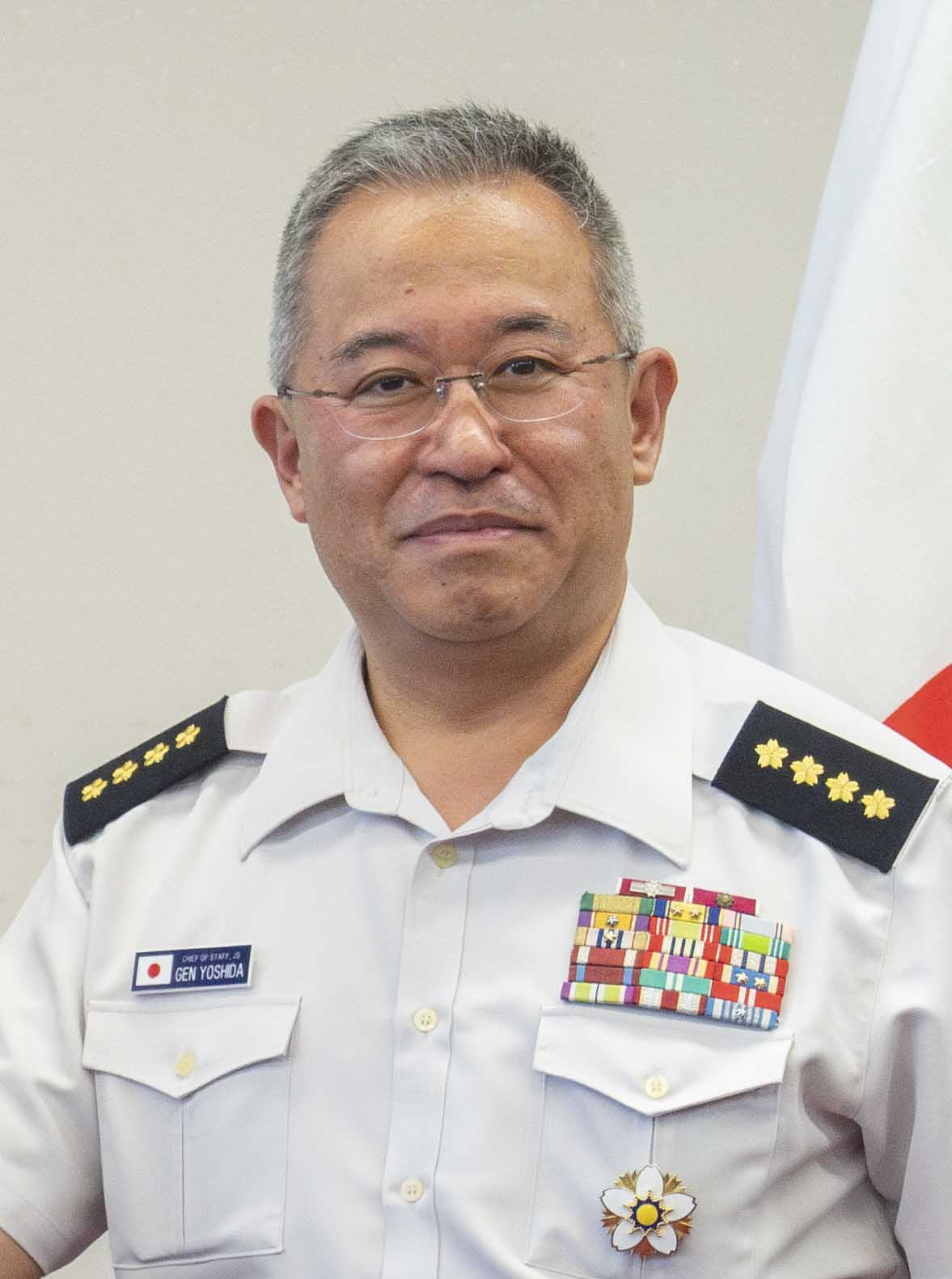
- Yoshihide Yoshida in 2024

Chief of Staff, Joint Staff
- In office 30 March 2023 – 1 August 2025
- Preceded by: Kōji Yamazaki
- Succeeded by: Hiroaki Uchikura

Chief of the Ground Staff
- In office 26 March 2021 – 30 March 2023
- Preceded by: Goro Yuasa
- Succeeded by: Yasunori Morishita

Personal details
- Born: 30 October 1962 (age 63) Tokyo, Japan
- Education: University of Tokyo (BE)

Military service
- Allegiance: Japan
- Branch/service: Japan Ground Self-Defense Force
- Years of service: 1986–2025
- Rank: General (JGSDF)
- Commands: Chief of Staff, Joint Staff Chief of the Ground Staff, JGSDF Ground Component Command Western Army 8th Division Director General on Public Affairs, Joint Staff 39th Infantry Regiment

General Yoshihide Yoshida (吉田 圭秀, Yoshida Yoshihide) (30 October 1962) is a Japanese retired military general who served as Chief of Staff, Joint Staff from March 2023 to August 2025. General Yoshida previously served as Chief of the Ground Staff, Japan Ground Self-Defense Force from March 2021 to March 2023, and is the first person to become a General Officer in the JSDF that did not graduate from the National Defense Academy in over 30 years.

== Early life and education ==
Yoshihide Yoshida was born on 30 October 1962 in Tokyo. As a child, he was known for his gentle looks and stubborn nature. Yoshida was raised in Tokyo, but often moved in his teen years due to his father's job. Yoshida completed his high school education at the Komaba Junior and Senior High School, also known as Tsukukoma, and later went to the University of Tokyo, where he studied and completed his Bachelor of Engineering (BE) degree, majoring in Urban Engineering. While studying at the university, Yoshida also served as a member of the National Security Research Society and later became interested in the "world of the SDF" during his third year in college upon reading a book relating to Japan's Comprehensive Security Research Program made under the premiership of former Prime Minister Masayoshi Ōhira, and became exposed to learning about strategic planning and national security. After his graduation, he commissioned into the JGSDF in 1986. Yoshida also took the National Institute for Defense Studies General Course in August 2005. Yoshida also attended various local officer courses throughout his career, which included the Command and Staff Course at the Command and Staff College.

== Military career ==
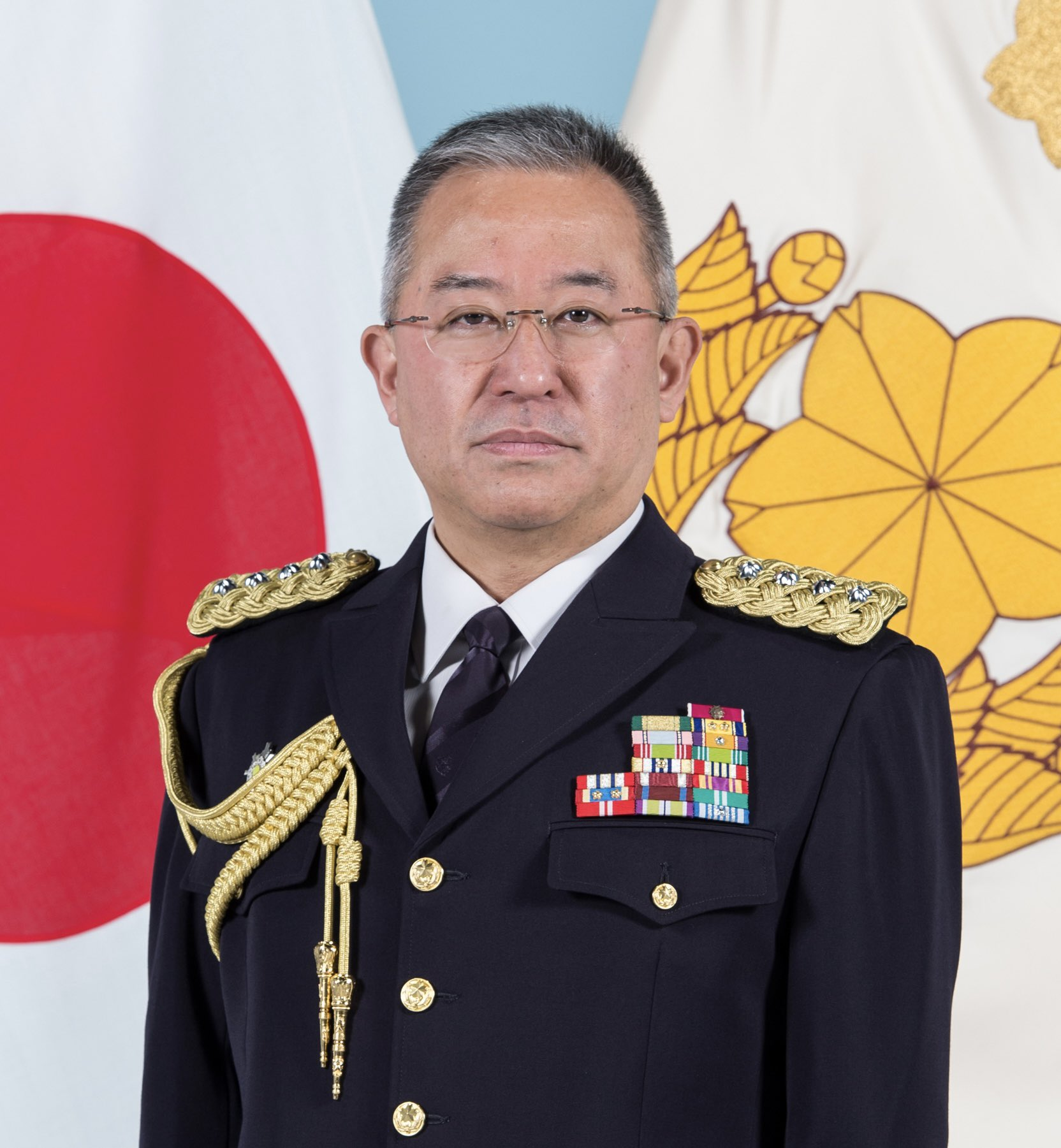
Official Portrait of General Yoshida as Chief of the Ground Staff, JGSDF

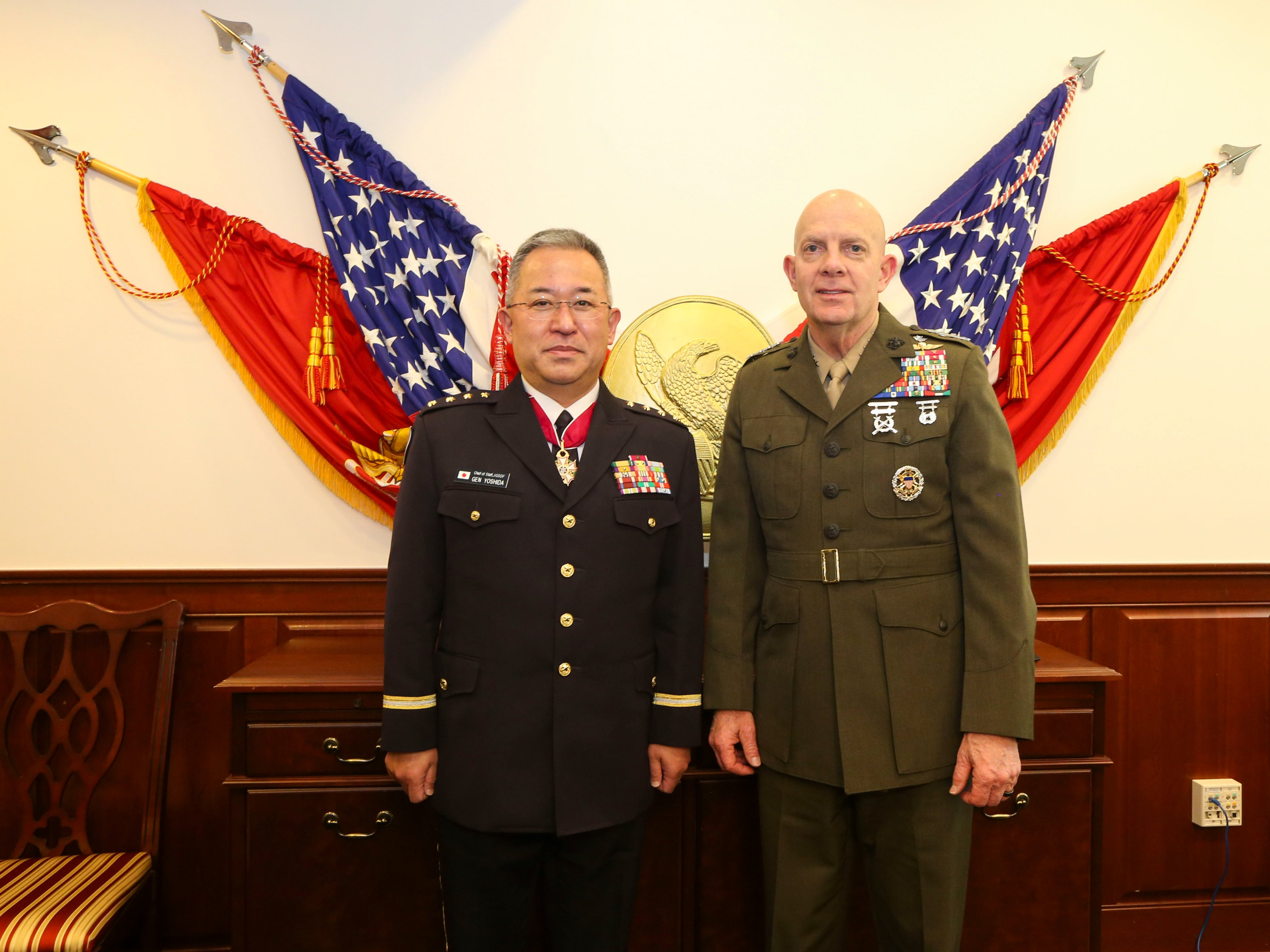
General Yoshida with the Commandant of the United States Marine Corps General David H. Berger

After graduating from the University of Tokyo in 1986, Yoshida joined the Ground Self-Defense Force Officer Candidate School, and was appointed as Chief Sergeant. In March 1987, Yoshida was placed under the 26th Infantry Regiment of the 2nd Division, where he became a rifle platoon leader under the 1st Company, and served under the Regiment for three and a half years. Yoshida later served as company commander of the 2nd Company of the 34th Infantry Regiment. In August 1990, Yoshida successfully completed the Ground Self-Defense Force Officer Candidate School. In March 1992, Yoshida served as a General Course Instructor under the Ordinary Course Teaching Regiment, before completing the Ground Self-Defense Force Command and Staff Course (39th term) in August 1993. In August 1995, Yoshida served under the Ministry of Foreign Affairs as part of the North America Bureau Japan-US Security Treaty Division, and in August 1997, he was named as company commander in the 34th Infantry Regiment under the 1st Division. Yoshida also served under the Personnel Department as an assistant in 1998, the Planning Section of the Equipment Department in 2000, and the Defense Department of the Defense Section of the Ground Staff Office in 2003.

Yoshida was promoted to Lieutenant Colonel in March 2005 and on August of the same year, Yoshida completed the General Course at the National Institute for Defense Studies. Yoshida later served as a researcher at the Research Headquarters in August 2006. Yoshida was named Head of the Business Planning Group, Defense Department in April 2007, before serving as a Regiment Commander of the 39th Infantry Regiment on March 24, 2009, where he also subsequently served as Camp Commander of Camp Hirosaki at Hirosaki, located in Aomori Prefecture, which is under the jurisdiction of the 9th Division. In March 2010, Yoshida served as the Chief for Policy & Programs Division of the Policy & Programs Department of the Ground Staff Office. Yoshida was named as Director General on Public Affairs, Joint Staff in March 2012, and in August 2013, he was named as Deputy Chief of Staff of the Western Army. In August 2015, Yoshida served as a Cabinet Councilor under the National Security Secretariat of the Cabinet Secretariat, making him the first non-NDA graduate officer who served the post.

In August 2017, Yoshida was named as commander of the 8th Division was promoted to Lieutenant General, and was present at the 8th Division Reorganization Ceremony at Camp Kita Kumamoto on 8 March 2018, which transformed the division into a "Rapid Deployment Division" for rapid deployment operations. In April 2020, Yoshida was named as the commander of the Ground Component Command, where he led the creation of various reforms for various strategies towards a unified rapid response under a centralized command. On 26 March 2021, Yoshida was appointed to the Chief of the Ground Staff of the JGSDF, the highest position in the service. Yoshida is the first officer in the Japan Ground Self-Defense Force to be placed from the post who came from a general university.

As Chief of the Ground Staff, Yoshida collaborated with various leaders aimed to enhance partnerships within the Asia-Pacific Region. On 3 June 2021, Yoshida had announced that he had a telephone conference with the Philippines' Defense Secretary Delfin Lorenzana and discussed higher levels of co-operation between the JGSDF and the Philippine Army. On 24 June 2021, Yoshida had announced that he had a telephone conference with the Indian Chief of Defence Staff Bipin Rawat, where they expanded defense ties between the two countries. On 2 December 2021, Yoshida announced new cyber warfare initiatives to be taken by the JGSDF, in co-operation with the US Navy and the US Army. On 14 December 2022, Yoshida attended the first trilateral Japan-Philippine-United States Land Forces Chiefs Meeting in Camp Asaka, aimed at enhancing the cooperation and ties between the three countries, and also met various officials during the event, such as United States Army Pacific Commander General Charles A. Flynn, United States Marine Corps Forces, Pacific Commander William Jurney, Commanding General of the Philippine Army then-Lieutenant General Romeo Brawner Jr., then-Philippine Marine Corps Commandant Charlton Sean Gaerlan, and other officials. On 16 February 2023, Yoshida also met with Vietnamese Chief of the General Staff General Nguyễn Tân Cương and other high-ranking officials to strengthen bilateral cooperation between the two countries.

=== Chief of Staff, Joint Staff ===
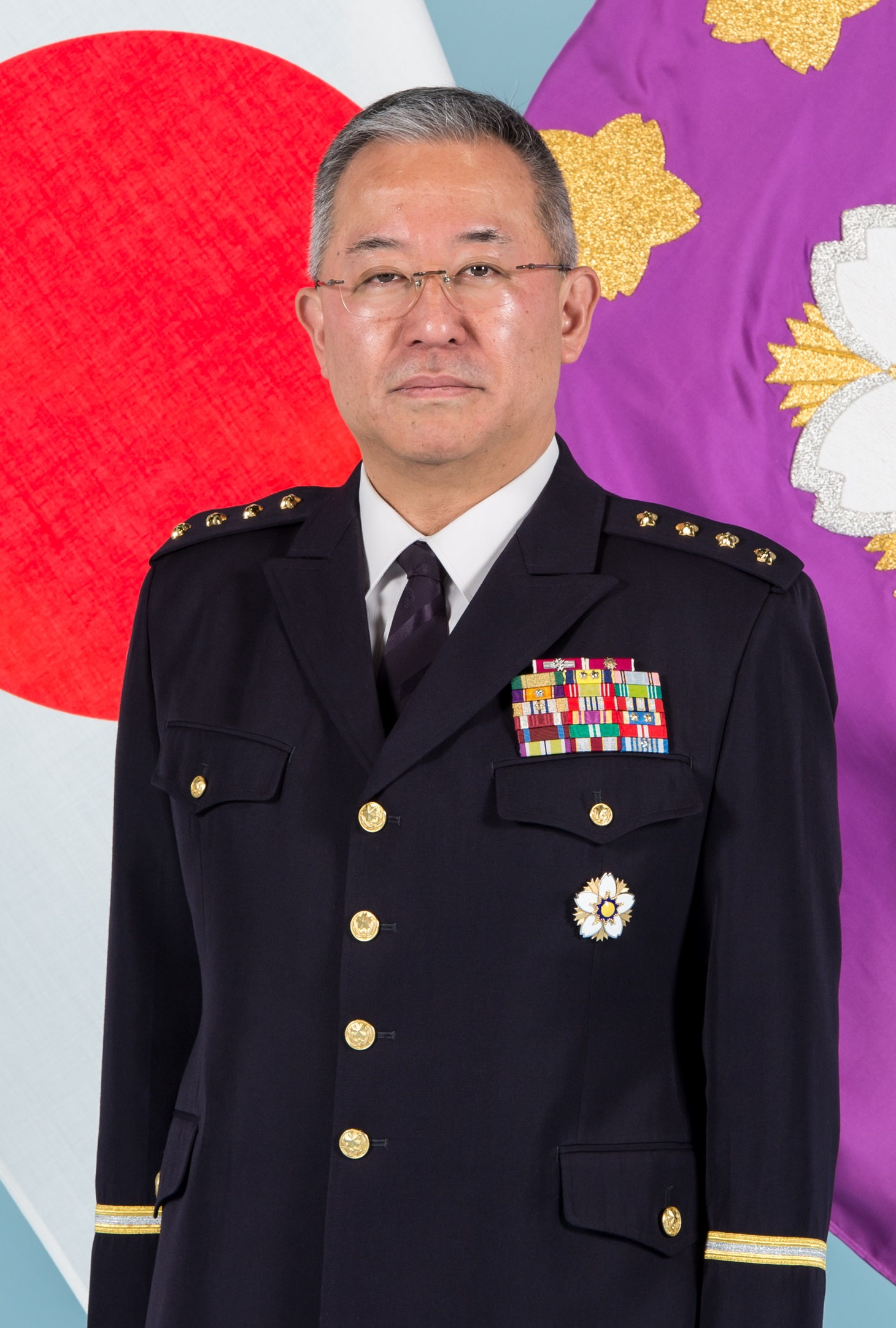
Official portrait of General Yoshida as Chief of Staff, Joint Staff

On 30 March 2023, the Ministry of Defense appointed General Yoshida as the next Chief of Staff, Joint Staff, replacing General Kōji Yamazaki. As Chief of Staff, Joint Staff, Yoshida continued to emphasize the importance of international collaboration and partnerships with other foreign armed forces in the Asia-Pacific and beyond. Yoshida also emphasized the need to modernize Japan's defense posture through the continuous implementation of Japan's New National Security Strategy, the National Defense Program Guidelines, and the Medium Term Defense Program, all of which are aimed to upgrade the SDF's capabilities by modernizing the SDF's doctrines and strategies and through the procurement of counterstrike platforms. The programs were further initiated amidst the Russian invasion of Ukraine and the growth of complex maritime threats in both national security and defense strategies within the Asia-Pacific region. Other related programs were also made to upgrade the SDF's deterrence capabilities crafting medium to long-term strategies on new domains such as space warfare, cybersecurity, and drone warfare.

To ensure operational efficiency in the SDF's joint operations within a unified joint command in all three branches of the SDF, Yoshida also spearheaded the creation of the Joint Operations Command, which supervises all the three branches of the SDF and establish cross-domain operations. The command also harmonizes all three branches in both peacetime missions to inter-island defense operations and external threats, such as the potential invasion of Taiwan and the rising tensions in the South China Sea.

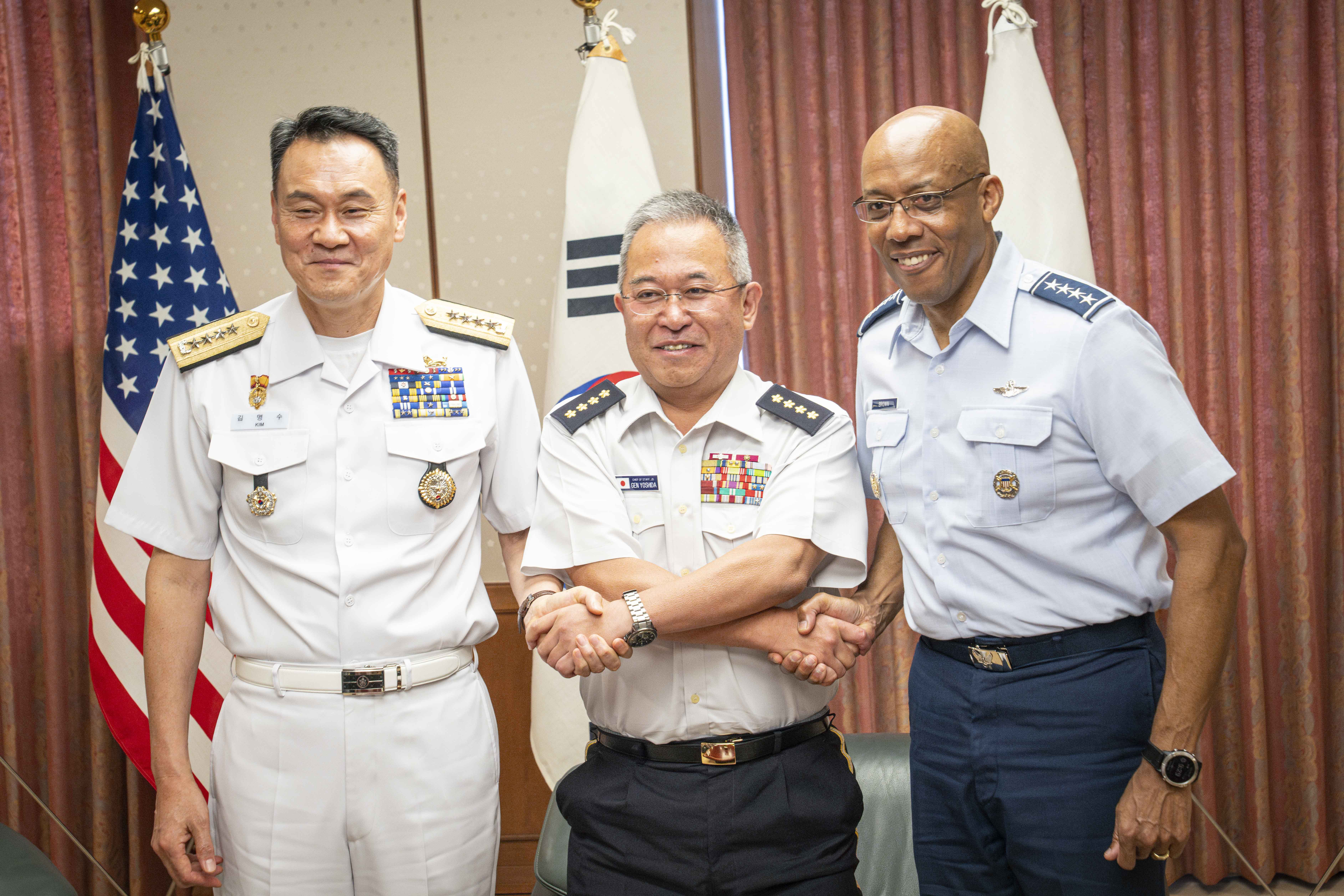
General Yoshida (middle) with South Korean Chairman of the Joint Chiefs of Staff Admiral Kim Myung-soo (left) and US Chairman of the Joint Chiefs of Staff General Charles Q. Brown Jr.(right) during the trilateral chiefs of defense (TRICHOD) meeting on July 18, 2024 in Tokyo, Japan

Yoshida also boosted cooperation and collaboration efforts aimed to strengthen the SDF's ties with other neighbouring countries in the region, such Australia, where he also pushed the sale of the Mogami-class frigates as part of the country's general purpose frigate program, and initiated the deployment of a variety of SDF personnel to participate in various exercises such as the 2023 Talisman Sabre Exercises. Yoshida also led cooperation efforts through a trilateral meeting between Japan, the United States, and South Korea on 18 July 2024, where he met with South Korean Chairman of the Joint Chiefs of Staff Admiral Kim Myung-soo and US Chairman of the Joint Chiefs of Staff General Charles Q. Brown Jr. The meeting was aimed to boost military ties between the three countries amidst the rising tensions within the Korean Peninsula and China's assertive actions within the East China Sea and the South China Sea. Yoshida also boosted cooperation with the Philippines upon the signing of the reciprocal access agreement between the two countries, where he met with the AFP Chief of Staff General Romeo Brawner Jr., Defense Secretary Gilbert Teodoro and other high-ranking officials. The agreement also paves the way for the potential sale and transfer of military equipment to the Philippines and allow both armed forces to train in each other's countries.

On 11 October 2024, Yoshida met with Indian Chief of the Naval Staff Admiral Dinesh Kumar Tripathi, where they discussed expanding cooperation, explore potential technological collaboration, and improve the bilateral ties between the two countries.

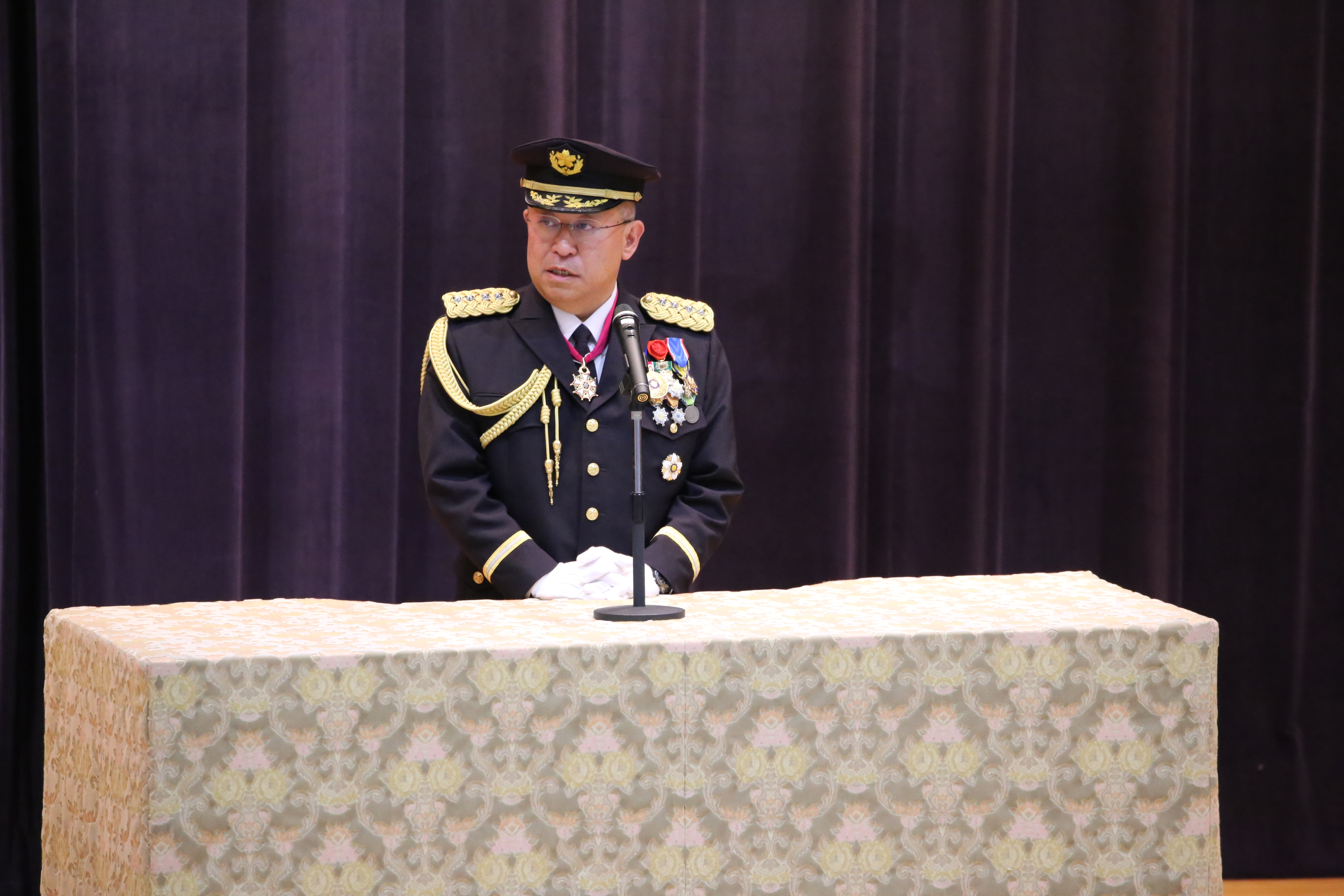
General Yoshida making his farewell speech as Chief of Staff, Joint Staff

On 30 October 2024, upon reaching the mandatory retirement age of 62, Yoshida's retirement has been postponed under a memorandum from the Ministry of Defense and his term as Chief of Staff, Joint Staff is extended until April 29, 2025. On another memorandum issued by the Ministry of Defense on April 25, 2025, Yoshida's term as Chief of Staff, Joint Staff was once again extended for a year, and will serve his term until April 29, 2026 at the latest.

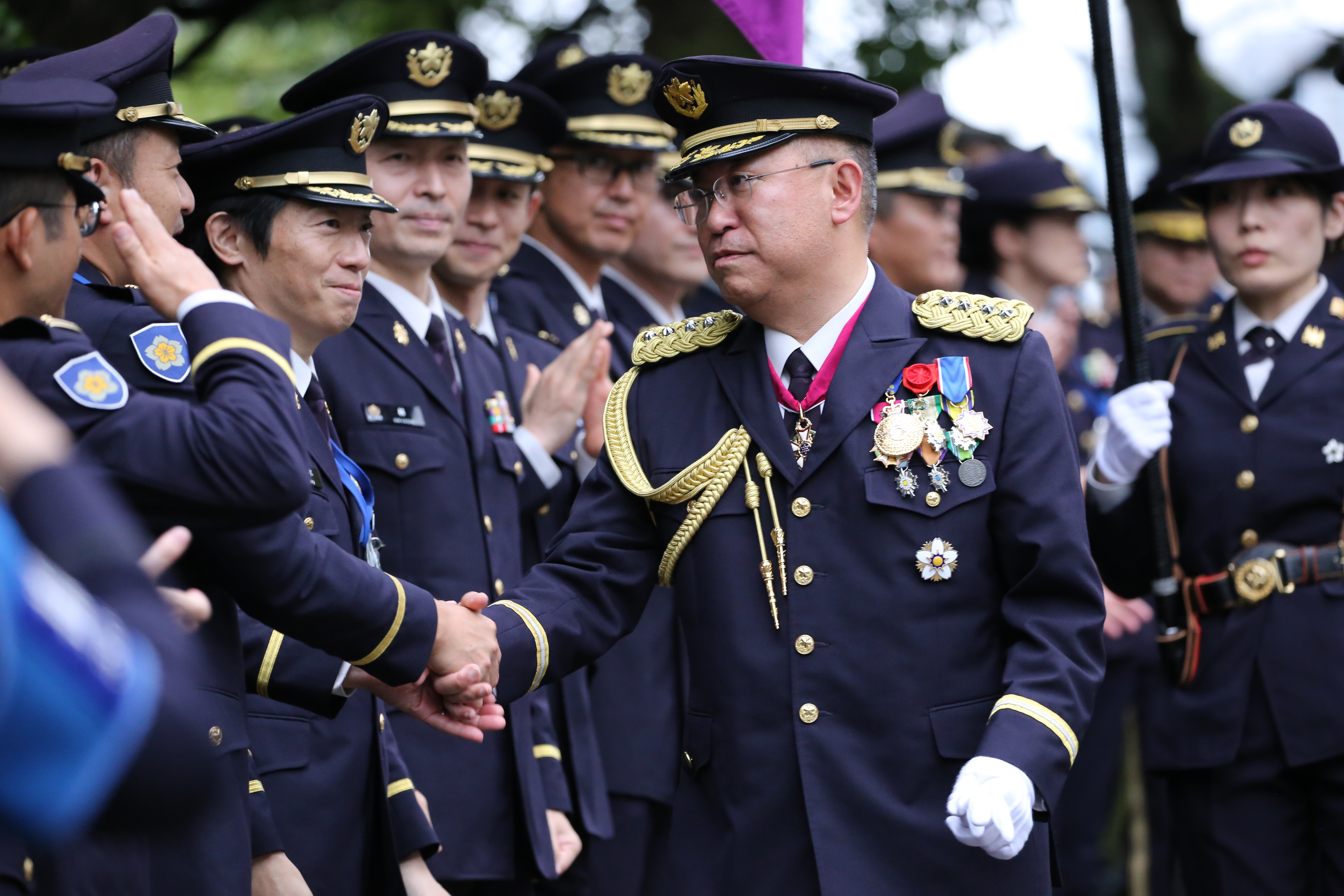
General Yoshida shaking hands to his subordinates at the Joint Staff Office on his retirement ceremony

At a cabinet meeting with government officials on 15 July 2025, Yoshida expressed his intention to resign from his post as the Chief of Staff, Joint Staff of the Self Defense Forces. His resignation also comes after witnessing the full creation of the Joint Operations Command and expressed his intention to give way to a new potential successor. Yoshida eventually retired from his post and on military service on 1 August 2025 and was replaced by ASDF Chief of Staff General Hiroaki Uchikura.

== Awards in military service ==
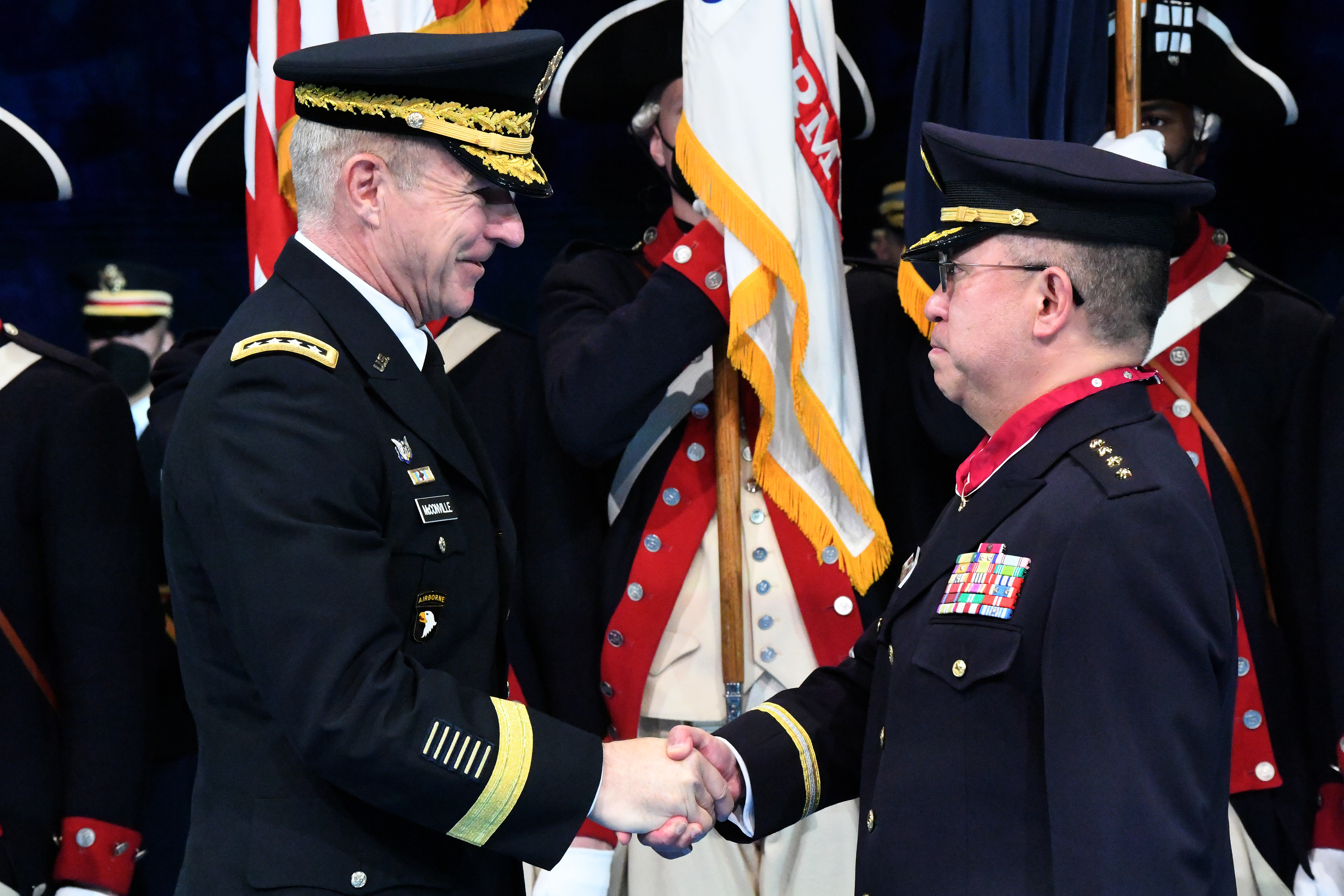
General Yoshida shaking hands with US Army Chief of Staff General James C. McConville after being presented the US Legion of Merit, with the degree of Commander (2022)

- - Officer, Legion of Merit
- - Commander, Legion of Merit (2022)
- Honorary Officer of the Order of Australia – 18 June 2024 – For distinguished service in strengthening the defence relationship between Australia and Japan as the Chief of Staff, Joint Staff of the Japan Self-Defense Forces and Chief of Ground Staff, Japan Ground Self-Defense Force.
- Officier, French Legion of Honour - 17 December 2024 - For distinguished service in strengthening the defence relationships between Japan and France as the Chief of Staff, Joint Staff of the Japan Self-Defense Forces.

=== Defensive memorial cordon ===
- 3rd Defensive Memorial Cordon
- 7th Defensive Memorial Cordon with 2 silver cherry blossom
- 11th Defensive Memorial Cordon
- 15th Defensive Memorial Cordon with 1 silver cherry blossom
- 16th Defensive Memorial Cordon
- 18th Defensive Memorial Cordon
- 19th Defensive Memorial Cordon
- 21st Defensive Memorial Cordon
- 22nd Defensive Memorial Cordon
- 24th Defensive Memorial Cordon
- 25th Defensive Memorial Cordon
- 26th Defensive Memorial Cordon
- 32nd Defensive Memorial Cordon
- 33rd Defensive Memorial Cordon
- 37th Defensive Memorial Cordon
- 40th Defensive Memorial Cordon
- 41st Defensive Memorial Cordon

Military offices
Preceded by Kōji Yamazaki	Chief of Staff, Joint Staff; March 2023–August 2025	Succeeded by Hiroaki Uchikura
Preceded by Gorō Yuasa	Chief of the Ground Staff; March 2021–March 2023	Succeeded by Yasunori Morishita
