= Ryosei Kokubun =

Japanese political scientist

Professor Ryosei Kokubun
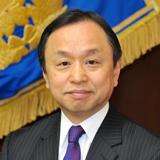
- Ryōsei Kokubun was inaugurated as President of the National Defense Academy in April 2012.

President of the National Defense Academy of Japan
- In office April 2012 – March 31, 2021
- Preceded by: Makoto Iokibe
- Succeeded by: Fumiaki Kubo

Personal details
- Born: November 1, 1953 (age 72) Tokyo, Japan
- Education: Keio University (BA), (MA), (PhD)
- Occupation: Academic, author

Ryosei Kokubun (Japanese: 國分 良成, romanized: Kokubun Ryōsei; November 1, 1953) is a Japanese academic and author. He is currently professor emeritus at Keio University and served as the President of the National Defense Academy of Japan from April 2012 to March 2021. Kokubun's main interests are Sino-Japanese relations and Chinese politics, and he previously served as Dean of the Faculty of Law and Politics of the Graduate School of Law at Keio University from 2007 to 2012 as well as being President of the Japan Association for Asian Studies from 2008 to 2012 and president of the Japan Association of International Relations.

He also served as the director of the Keio University East Asian Institute, Japan from 1999 to 2007 at Keio University.

== Academic background ==
He attended Keio University for his Bachelor of Arts degree in laws in 1976 and for his masters of arts degree in laws in 1978. He obtained his Ph.D., of law at the same Keio University in 1981.

== Academics ==
In 1981, he became an assistant professor at Keio University and from 1982-83 was a visiting scholar at Harvard University at the Fairbank Center, from 1983-84 at the University of Michigan of Center for Chinese Studies, from 1987-88 at Fudan University in Shanghai, in 1997 at Beijing University, and in 1998 at National Taiwan University. He became an associate professor at Keio University in 1985 and in 1992 became full professor.

== Publication ==
- Sino-Japanese Relations: The Need for Conflict Prevention and Management. ed Niklas Swanström, Ryōsei Kokubun. Cambridge Scholars Publishing, 2008, ISBN 1847186203, 9781847186201, Business Ethics
- Challenges for China-Japan-U.S. Cooperation Volume 21 of JCIE papers. ed Kokubun, Ryosei, cnNihon Kokusai Kōryū Sentā. Japan Center for International Exchange, 1998, Original from the University of California Digitized 25 Sep 2008, ISBN 4889070176, 9784889070170
- Japan–China Relations in the Modern Era. Ryosei Kokubun, Yoshihide Soeya, Akio Takahara, Shin Kawashima, Keith Krulaka, ISBN 1138714607, 978-1138714601, Dimensions 6.14 x 0.57 x 9.21 inches, Routledge; 1st ed: April 24, 2017, (English)
- Ryōsei Kokubun Chūgoku seiji to minshuka: Kaikaku, kaihō seisaku no jisshō bunseki- The political process and democratization in China. Ed Japanese, ISBN 4377109286, 978-4377109283, Saimaru Shuppankai, January 1, 1992
- Getting the Triangle Straight: Managing China-Japan-US Relations. ed Gerald Curtis, Ryosei Kokubun, Wang Jisi. Nihon Kokusai Kōryū Sentā. Japan Center for International Exchange, 2010. ISBN 488907080X, 9784889070804, Political Science/Diplomacy Political Science
- The Rise of China and a Changing East Asian Order. ed Wang Jisi, Kokubun Ryosei. con Nihon Kokusai, Koryu Senta, Nihon Kokusai Kōryū Senta. Japan Center for International Exchange, 2004 Original from the University of California Digitized, 9 Sep 2008, ISBN 4889070699, 9784889070699, Political Sciences/Comparative Politics.

== Bibliography ==
- Kokubun, Ryosei; Soeya, Yoshihide; 高原明生; Kawashima, Shin (2017-03-31). Japan–China Relations in the Modern Era. Taylor & Francis. ISBN 978-1-351-85794-9.
- Ryosei, Kokubun (February 1998). Challenges for China-Japan-U.S. Cooperation. Japan Center for International Exchange. ISBN 978-4-88907-017-0.
- Kokubun, Ryosei; Soeya, Yoshihide; 高原明生; Kawashima, Shin (2017-03-31). Japan–China Relations in the Modern Era. Taylor & Francis. ISBN 978-1-351-85794-9.
- Curtis, Gerald; Kokubun, Ryosei; Jisi, Wang (March 2010). Getting the Triangle Straight: Managing China-Japan-US Relations. Japan Center for International Exchange. ISBN 978-4-88907-080-4.
- Jisi, Wang; Ryosei, Kokubun (March 2004). The Rise of China and a Changing East Asian Order. Japan Center for International Exchange. ISBN 978-4-88907-069-9.
