= Japan Self-Defense Forces Service Ribbon =

Decoration for Japan Self-Defense Forces

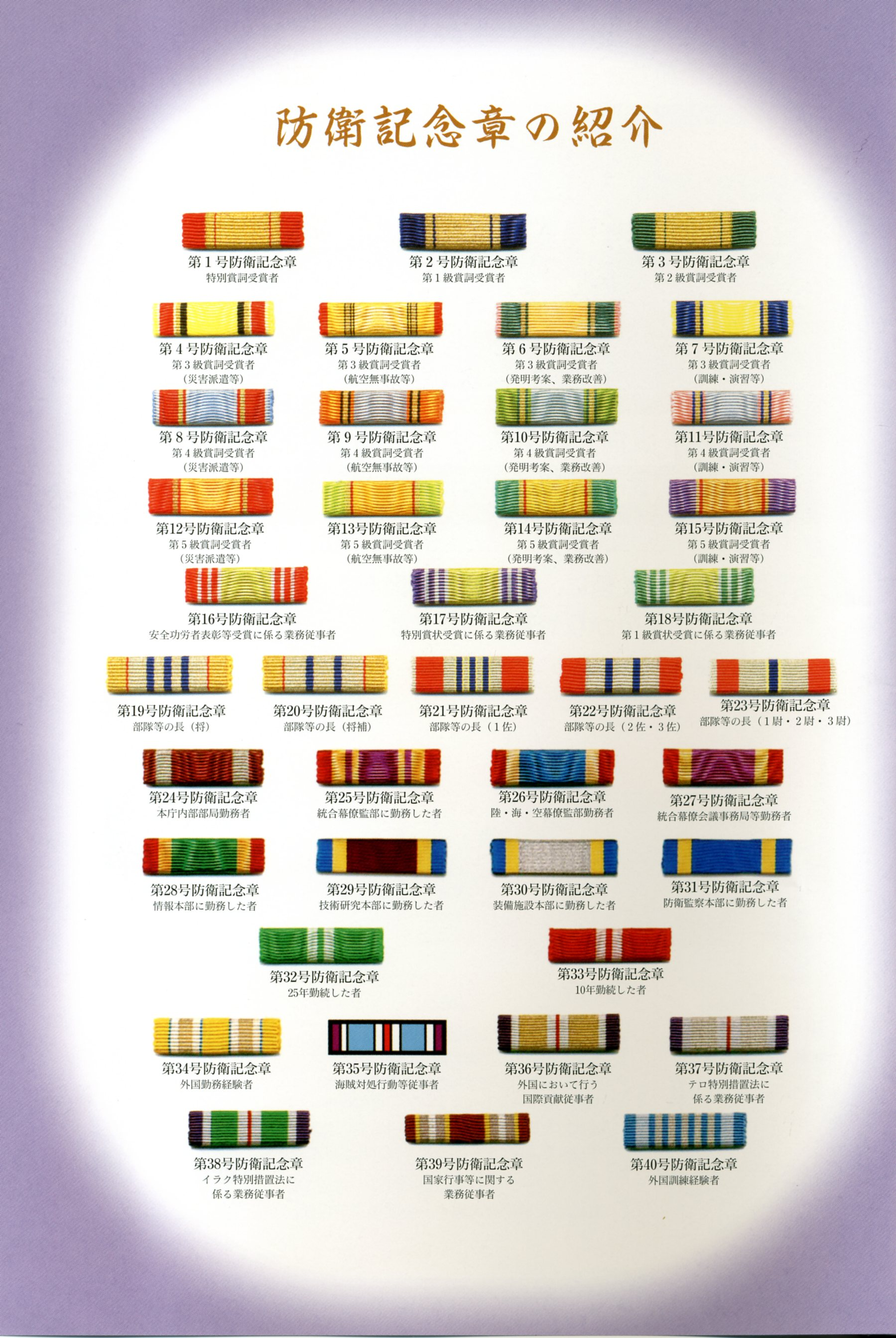
List of Self-Defense Forces Service Ribbons

The Japan Self-Defense Forces Service Ribbon, also called the Self-Defense Commemorative Ribbon or the Defensive Memorial Cordon, (Japanese: 防衛記念章) is the decoration for officers in the Japan Self-Defense Forces. Officials may wear it on their uniforms while in active service. They are only ribbons, like the Unit Awards and Citations of the United States Armed Forces.

The appearance of the Self-Defense Forces Service Ribbons is similar to ribbon bars for military decorations. The defensive memorial cordon is a 'rectangular memorial souvenir' of the service member's career, training overseas, and participation in international peacekeeping and assistance operations.

== History ==
=== Before establishment ===
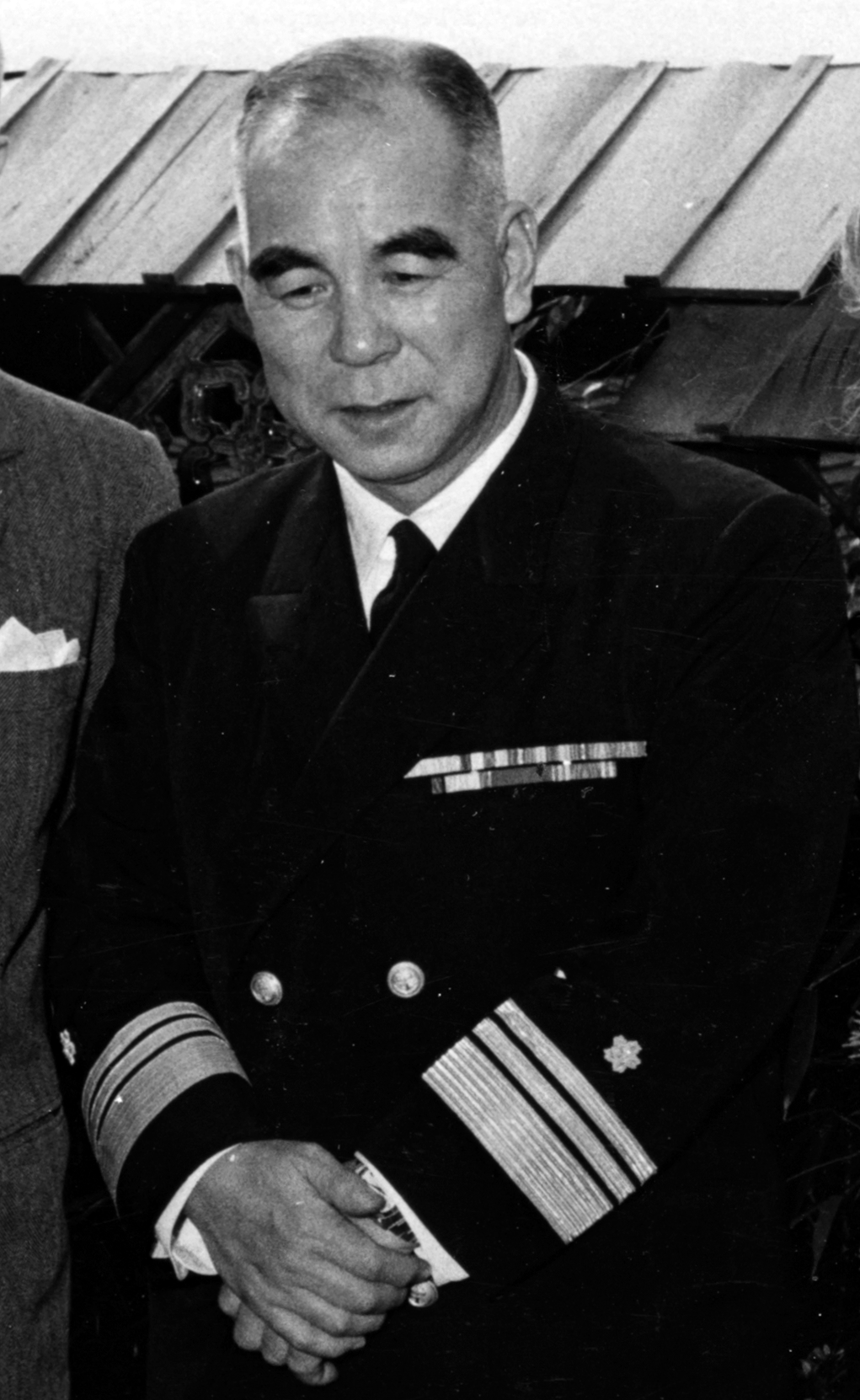
Vice Admiral Mitsugu Ihara wearing a WWII era ribbon bar in 1959.

After World War II, the standard for conferment of a decoration was changed and JSDF officials in active service were excluded from the now-civilian orders and decorations. In addition, the JSDF could not gain opportunity to participate battle because it is prohibited by Chapter 9 of the Constitution of Japan.

Just after the JSDF was established in 1954, there were some officials who had military decorations and ribbon bars awarded by Imperial Japanese Armed Forces, that they wore in formal ceremony. They retired as time went on, and due to the new government, were issued no longer. For this reason, the officers in the JSDF in the 1970s had to participate in international meetings without any domestic decorations.

=== Establishment ===
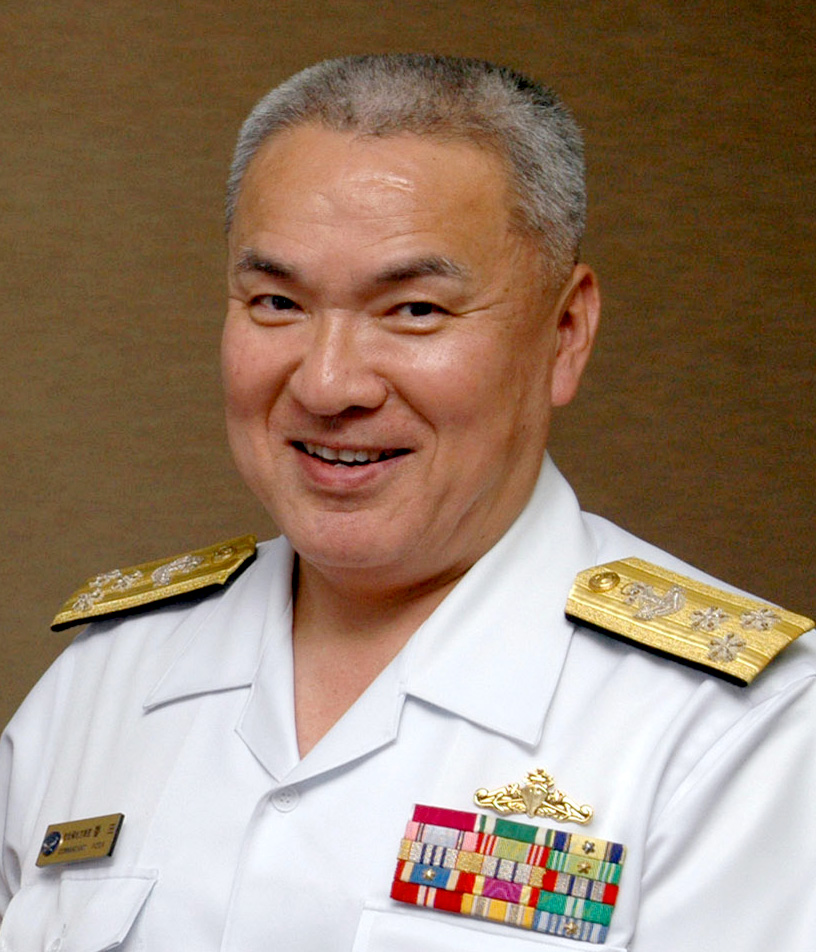
VADM Yoji Koda in Japanese Maritime Self-Defense Force wearing the ribbon bars on his left chest.

On April 1, 1982, the system for Self-Defense Forces Service Ribbons was established to keep balance of looking between Japanese and foreign servicemen. When the system for Self-Defense Forces Service Ribbons was established, there were only 15 types of ribbon bars, unlike past decorations the ribbon bars are only used by officers of the JSDF.

== Requirements ==
The following Self-Defense Force officers in active service are allowed to wear the Self-Defense Forces Service Ribbon:

1. Officers who receive an official commendation by the Japan Self-Defense Forces
2. Officers who serve duties about the concerned awarding at the awarded institutions (National Defense Academy, National Defense Medical College, National Institute for Defense Studies, Technical Research and Development Institute, Equipment Procurement and Construction Office, the military units, the military institutions, a branch offices of Equipment office)
3. Officers who are commanders of units and commands or other managerial positions established by the Minister of Defense.
4. Officers who serve duties at the internal Subdivisions (Internal Subdivisions in Ministry of Defense, Section of the Joint Staffs, Defense Intelligence Headquarters, Ground Staff Office, Maritime Staff Office, Air Staff Office, Technical Research and Development Institute, Equipment Procurement and Construction Office, Inspector General's Office of Legal Compliance)
5. Long serving officers. In this case, the officials who were awarded the prize of perfect attendance.
6. Officers who work at the diplomatic missions overseas, or who were engaged duties about procurement by onerous assistance or other overseas activities as may be ordered.
7. Officers who participate in overseas training missions and exercises or work for transporting to the South Pole.
8. Officers who participate in international cooperation activities, such as peacekeeping operations, disaster relief and joint training exercises with foreign armed forces.
9. Officers who participate in national events or cooperating work of sports competitions which are regulated in Self-Defense Forces Act Chapter 126-12 (Olympic Games, Asian Games, National Sports Festival, FIFA World Cup, etc.) as may be directed by General Headquarters, JSDF

== Types of Service Ribbons ==
There are today 41 ribbon bars. When the system for the Self-Defense Forces Service Ribbons was established, there were only 15 ribbons. They must be worn in ascending order. Male officials wear three ribbon bars for each line, and female officials wear two ribbon bars for each line. If foreign orders or decorations are awarded, these take precedence over the ribbon bars and are required to be placed above them.

Some ribbon bars (marked as grey) still exist, but it is impossible to meet their requirements as either the organizations in question have been abolished or the missions have been finished.

Appearance	English name	Japanese name	Wearer
	1st Self-Defense Service Ribbon	第1号防衛記念章	Awarded to officers who have received the SDF Special Citation for bravery and valor in national defense and civil disaster relief.
	2nd Self-Defense Service Ribbon	第2号防衛記念章	Awarded to officers who have received the 1st Class Citation.
	3rd Self-Defense Service Ribbon	第3号防衛記念章	Awarded to officers who have received the 2nd Class Citation.
	4th Self-Defense Service Ribbon	第4号防衛記念章	Awarded to officers who have received the 3rd Class Citation for national defense and civil relief operations.
	5th Self-Defense Service Ribbon	第5号防衛記念章	Awarded to officers who have received the 3rd Class Citation by driving vehicles or aircraft for appointed hours and for appointed mileage without accidents.
	6th Self-Defense Service Ribbon	第6号防衛記念章	Awarded to officers who have received the 3rd Class Citation by excellent invention or device technically or distinguished service for unit management with service improvement.
	7th Self-Defense Service Ribbon	第7号防衛記念章	Awarded to officers who have received the 3rd Class Citation by distinguished service during the ordinary training or maneuvers.
	8th Self-Defense Service Ribbon	第8号防衛記念章	Awarded to officers who have received the 4th Class Citation for national defense and civil relief operations.
	9th Self-Defense Service Ribbon	第9号防衛記念章	Awarded to officers who have received the 4th Class Citation by driving the vehicles or aircraft for appointed hour and for appointed mileage without accidents.
	10th Self-Defense Service Ribbon	第10号防衛記念章	Awarded to officers who have received the 4th Class Citation by excellent invention or device technically or distinguished service for unit management with service improvement.
	11th Self-Defense Service Ribbon	第11号防衛記念章	Awarded to officers who have received the 4th Class Citation by distinguished service during the ordinary training or maneuvers.
	12th Self-Defense Service Ribbon	第12号防衛記念章	Awarded to officers who have received the 5th Class Citation for national defense and civil relief operations.
	13th Self-Defense Service Ribbon	第13号防衛記念章	Awarded to officers who have received the 5th Class Citation by driving the vehicles or aircraft for appointed hour and for appointed mileage without accidents.
	14th Self-Defense Service Ribbon	第14号防衛記念章	Awarded to officers who have received the 5th Class Citation by excellent invention or device technically or distinguished service for unit management with service improvement.
	15thSelf-Defense Service Ribbon	第15号防衛記念章	Awarded to officers who have received the 5th Class Citation for distinguished service during the ordinary training or maneuvers.
	16thSelf-Defense Service Ribbon	第16号防衛記念章	Officers from the units which for service for the country in defense operations, international deployments and civil disaster relief were awarded the Security Meritorious Award or Disaster Prevention Meritorious Award.
	17th Self-Defense Service Ribbon	第17号防衛記念章	Officers of JSDF formations and agencies who served missions related to the Special Award.
	18th Self-Defense Service Ribbon	第18号防衛記念章	Officers of JSDF formations and agencies who served missions related to 1st Class Citation.
	19th Self-Defense Service Ribbon	第19号防衛記念章	Awarded to general and flag officers with command appointments (lieutenant general, vice admiral).
	20th Self-Defense Service Ribbon	第20号防衛記念章	Awarded to general and flag officers with command appointments (major general, rear admiral).
	21st Self-Defense Service Ribbon	第21号防衛記念章	Awarded to field officers with command appointments (colonel, captain).
	22nd Self-Defense Service Ribbon	第22号防衛記念章	Awarded to field officers with command appointments (lieutenant colonel, commander, major, lieutenant commander).
	23rd Self-Defense Service Ribbon	第23号防衛記念章	Awarded to junior officers with command or leadership appointments (company-grade officer).
	24th Self-Defense Service Ribbon	第24号防衛記念章	Awarded to officers who serve at the internal subdivisions of Ministry of Defense.
	25th Self-Defense Service Ribbon	第25号防衛記念章	Awarded to officers who serve at the Joint Staff Office and also were chosen by the Minister of Defense (substitution of 27th cordon).
	26th Self-Defense Service Ribbon	第26号防衛記念章	Awarded to officers who serve at the Ground Staff Office, Maritime Staff Office, or Air Staff Office.
	27th Self-Defense Service Ribbon	第27号防衛記念章	Awarded to officers served at the Joint Staff Council and the Defense Intelligence Headquarters. (Note: It is impossible now to be awarded the Self-Defense Commemorative Ribbon because the Joint Staff Council was abolished and reorganized as the Joint Staff Office. For this reason, 25th and 28th ribbons were established.)
	28th Self-Defense Service Ribbon	第28号防衛記念章	Awarded to officers who serve at the Defense Intelligence Headquarters after shifting to the joint operations posture, and who were appointed by the Minister of Defense (substitution of 27th cordon).
	29th Self-Defense Service Ribbon	第29号防衛記念章	Awarded to officers who served at the Technical Research and Development Institute.
	30th Self-Defense Service Ribbon	第30号防衛記念章	Awarded to officers who served at the Equipment Procurement and Construction Office.
	31st Self-Defense Service Ribbon	第31号防衛記念章	Awarded to officers who serve at the Inspector General's Office of Legal Compliance.
	32nd Self-Defense Service Ribbon	第32号防衛記念章	Awarded for 25 years of service.
	33rd Self-Defense Service Ribbon	第33号防衛記念章	Awarded for 10 years of service.
	34th Self-Defense Service Ribbon	第34号防衛記念章	Awarded to officers serving at Diplomatic missions as Defense Attache and so on, or who were engaged duties about procurement by onerous assistance or other overseas activities.
	35th Self-Defense Service Ribbon	第35号防衛記念章	Awarded to officers deployed in JSDF operations against Piracy in Somalia.
	36th Self-Defense Service Ribbon	第36号防衛記念章	Awarded to officers of JSDF formations and agencies who served in the aftermath of the 2011 Tōhoku earthquake and tsunami.
	37th Self-Defense Service Ribbon	第37号防衛記念章	Awarded to officers of JSDF who participated in works and actions for international cooperation as may be authorized by the Defense Forces.
	38th Self-Defense Service Ribbon	第38号防衛記念章	Awarded to JSDF members who participated in operations in the Indian Sea.
	39th Self-Defense Service Ribbon	第39号防衛記念章	Awarded to JSDF members who participated in operations in Iraq.
	40th Self-Defense Service Ribbon	第40号防衛記念章	Awarded to JSDF officers for outstanding service in national events as be authorized by General Headquarters, JSDF.
	41st Self-Defense Service Ribbon	第41号防衛記念章	Awarded to officers of the JSDF who participate in overseas training and simulation missions with other armed services.

== Rules for multiple awardees ==
If the same ribbon bars are to be awarded for further actions officers qualified to receive them have to put gold or silver cherry blossoms on the ribbon bars.

- 1 silver cherry blossom for 2 ribbons.
- 1 gold cherry blossom for 3 cordons.
- 2 silver cherry blossoms for 4 cordons.
- 2 gold cherry blossoms for more than 4 cordons.
1 silver cherry blossom on 12th ribbon

2 silver cherry blossom on 12th ribbon
