= 9th Division (Japan) =

- 9th Division Distinctive Unit Insignia
- Active: 15 August 1962 – present
- Country: Japan
- Branch: Japan Ground Self-Defense Force
- Type: Infantry division
- Size: about 7000 soldiers
- Part of: North Eastern Army
- Garrison/HQ: Aomori

Commanders
- Current commander: Lt. Gen. Shinji Kameyama

The 9th Division (第9師団) is one of nine active divisions of the Japan Ground Self-Defense Force. The division is subordinated to the North Eastern Army and is headquartered in Aomori. Its responsibility is the defense of Akita, Aomori and Iwate prefectures.

The division was raised on 15 August 1962.

== Organization ==
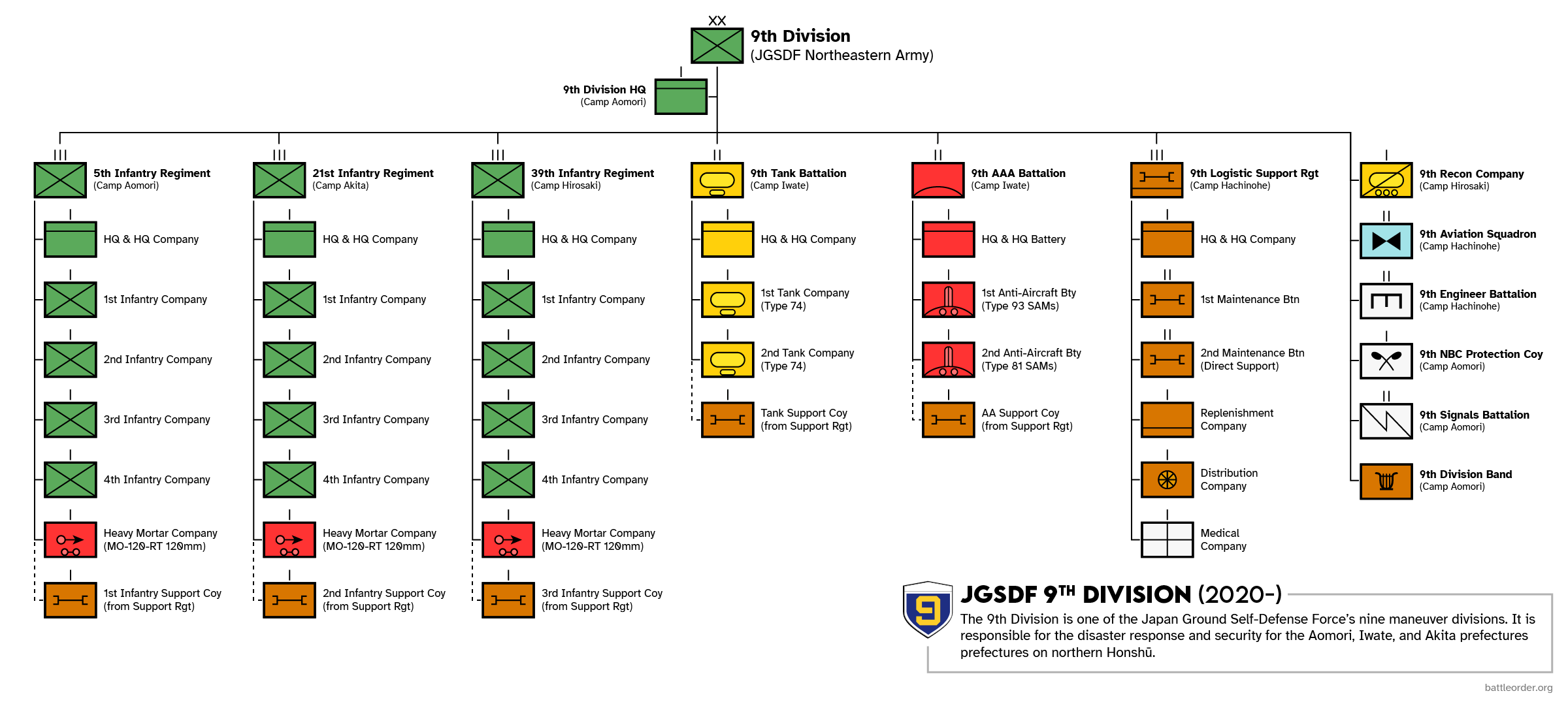
JGSDF 9th Division organization in 2022

- 9th Division, in Aomori
  - 9th Division HQ, in Aomori
  - 5th Infantry Regiment ^{note 1}, in Aomori
  - 21st Infantry Regiment, in Akita
  - 39th Infantry Regiment, in Hirosaki
  - 9th Reconnaissance Combat Battalion, in Iwate, with Type 16 maneuver combat vehicles, and Type 87 armored reconnaissance vehicles
  - 9th Anti-Aircraft Artillery Battalion, in Takizawa, with one Type 81 and one Type 93 surface-to-air missile battery
  - 9th Engineer Battalion (Combat), in Hachinohe
  - 9th Signal Battalion, in Aomori
  - 9th Aviation Squadron, in Hachinohe, flying UH-1J and OH-6D helicopters
  - 9th NBC Protection Company, in Aomori
  - 9th Logistic Support Regiment, in Hachinohe
    - 1st Maintenance Battalion
    - 2nd Maintenance Battalion (direct support)
    - Supply Company
    - Medical Company
    - Transport Company

note 1: Infantry Regiments have only battalion strength.
