= National Defense Academy of Japan =

Military education institution in Kanagawa Prefecture, Japan

Coordinates: 35°15′27.6″N 139°43′19.1″E

- 防衛大学校 (Bōei Daigakkō)
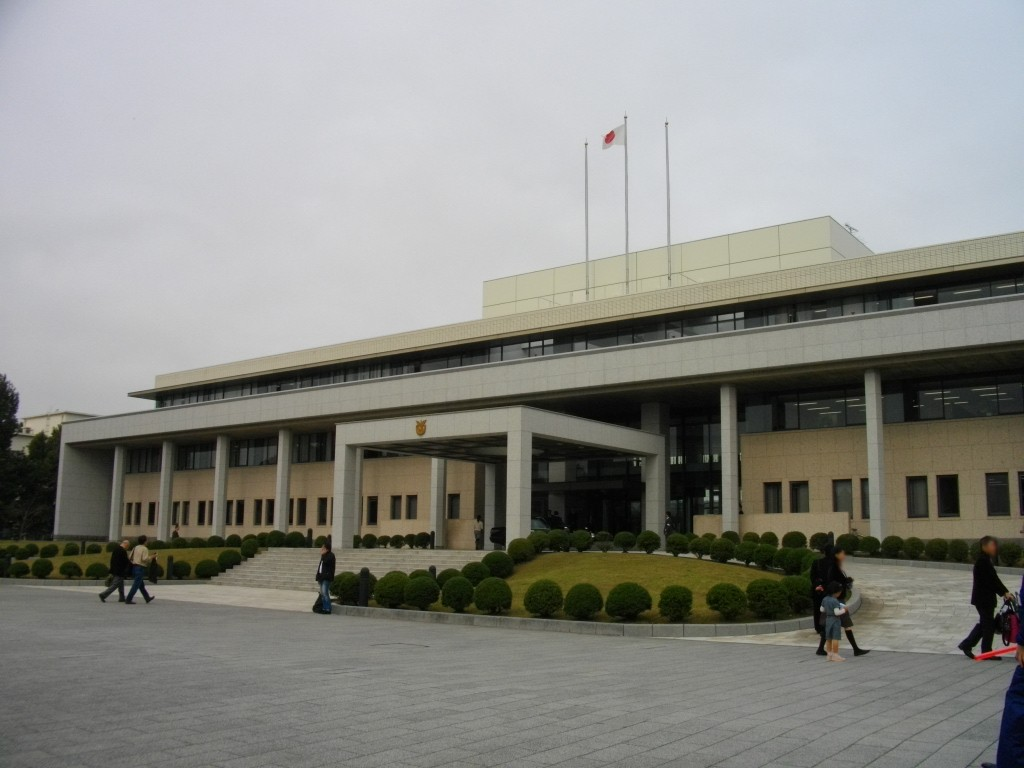
- Main building of the NDAJ
- Type: Four-year university-level military academy
- Established: 1953
- Affiliations: Ministry of Defense
- President: Yoshihide Yoshida
- Vice-president: Yoshiki Adachi
- Director of Training: Makoto Nakaoji
- Academic staff: 315 full-time
- Students: Future Officers in the three branches of the Japan Self-Defense Forces
- Undergraduates: Ministry of Education, Culture, Sports, Science and Technology's National Institution for Academic Degrees and University Evaluation
- Postgraduates: Yes, see above
- Doctoral students: Yes, see above
- Location: Yokosuka, Kanagawa, Japan
- Website: National Defense Academy of Japan Webpage

National Defense Academy of Japan (防衛大学校, Bōei Daigakkō), abbreviated NDA (防大, Bōdai) is the national, four-year university-level service academy aimed to educate and train students who will be serving as officers in the three services of the Japan Self-Defense Forces. It is located in Yokosuka, Kanagawa.

== History ==
The National Defense Academy of Japan was opened in 1952 as National Safety Academy (保安大学校), and was renamed "National Defense Academy" in 1954, when the incipient Japanese military was renamed from National Safety Force (保安隊) to the Japan Self-Defense Forces. In contrast to the pre-war period, when the Imperial Navy and Army had separate academies (respectively, the Imperial Japanese Navy Academy and the Imperial Japanese Army Academy), the National Safety Academy (later the National Defense Academy) was established as a unified institution in order to mitigate the effects of sectionalism and inter-service rivalry. The Academy matriculated its first female student on April 1, 1992.

== Selection ==
Its main course students are selected from applicants and typically are recent graduates from Japanese civilian senior high schools who have completed twelve years of formal schooling. They are paid a salary as employees of the Ministry of Defense.

After graduation they are posted to the Officer Candidate Schools in one of three forces, conduct training alongside civilian university graduates and internal promotees before being commissioned as an officer after a year or two.

== Postgraduate ==
The academy also conducts master's and doctoral level courses for students who are endorsed by their supervisors at their respective serving forces.

== Affiliation ==
The National Institution for Academic Degrees and Quality Enhancement of Higher Education, an Independent Administrative Institution affiliated with the Ministry of Education, Culture, Sports, Science and Technology (MEXT) has recognised the courses and awards the graduates degrees on request. As the Academy is not an MEXT-recognised university, it cannot offer its own degrees.

== List of presidents ==
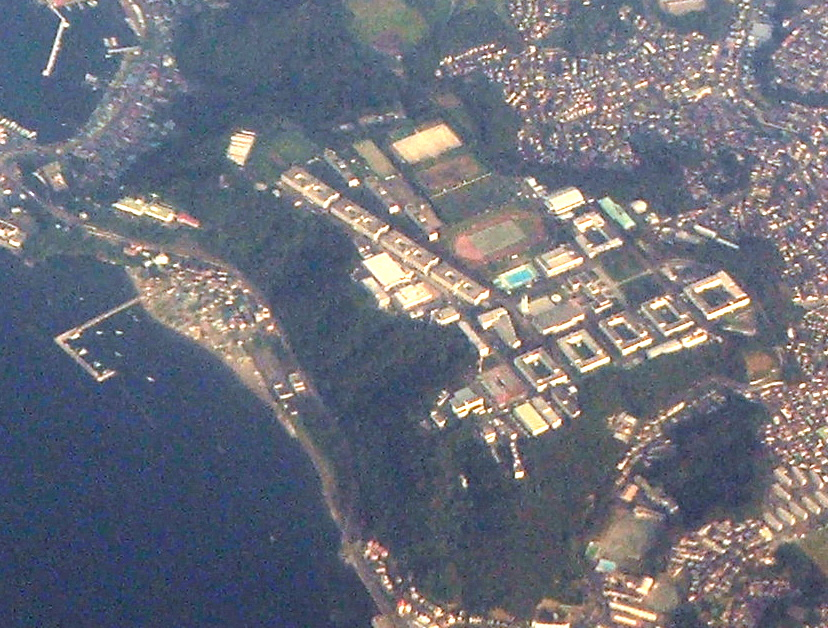
National Defense Academy of Japan aerial view

- Tomoō Maki (August 19, 1952 – January 16, 1965)
- Hiroshi Omori (January 16, 1965 – July 1, 1970)
- Masamichi Inoki (July 16, 1970 – July 15, 1978)
- Kuniyasu Tsuchida (September 29, 1978 – March 24, 1987)
- Haruo Natsume (March 24, 1987 – September 30, 1993)
- Saburō Matsumoto (October 1, 1993 – March 31, 2000)
- Masashi Nishihara (April 1, 2000 – March 31, 2006)
- Makoto Iokibe (August 1, 2006 – March 31, 2012)
- Ryosei Kokubun (April 1, 2012 – March 31, 2021)
- Fumiaki Kubo (April 1, 2021 – March 31, 2026)
- Yoshihide Yoshida (April 1, 2026 – present)

== Notable alumni ==
- Yoshifumi Hibako, chief of staff, Japan Ground Self-Defense Force
- Yuji Fujinawa, chief of staff, Japan Ground Self-Defense Force
- Toshio Tamogami, chief of staff, Japan Air Self-Defense Force
- Satoshi Morimoto, scholar
- Gen Nakatani, Minister of Defense in the first cabinet of Junichiro Koizumi.
- Yoshihiro Murai, governor of Miyagi Prefecture
- Masahisa Sato, member of the House of Councillors
- Takashi Uto, member of the House of Councillors
- Kimiya Yui, astronaut
- Jun Seki, businessman
- Sudaryono, Head of National Nutrition Agency and former Deputy Minister of Agriculture.

== Notable faculty ==
- Condoleezza Rice had a three-week visiting professorship at the NDAJ in 1984, where she "had a hard time adjusting to the rigid hierarchy," according to her 2010 memoirs, Extraordinary, Ordinary People.
- Ikujiro Nonaka, organizational theorist
- Ikuhiko Hata, historian

== See also ==
- Military academy
- National Defense Medical College
- International Peace Cooperation Activities Training Unit
