= Japan Self-Defense Forces =

Military forces of Japan

Japan Self-Defense Forces (J.S.D.F)
- 自衛隊
- Flag of the Japan Self-Defense Forces
- Founded: 1 July 1954; 72 years ago
- Service branches: Japan Ground Self-Defense Force; Japan Maritime Self-Defense Force; Japan Air Self-Defense Force
- Headquarters: Ministry of Defense, Tokyo, Japan

Leadership
- Commander-in-Chief: Prime Minister Sanae Takaichi
- Minister of Defense: Shinjirō Koizumi
- Chief of Staff, Joint Staff: General Hiroaki Uchikura
- Commander, JSDF Joint Operations Command: Admiral Tateki Tawara (ja)

Personnel
- Military age: 18–33 eligible for enlistment
- Conscription: No
- Active personnel: 251,500
- Reserve personnel: 56,000

Expenditure
- Budget: ¥9.03 trillion (US$57.1 billion) (2026) (ranked 10th)
- Percent of GDP: 1.9% (2026)

Industry
- Domestic suppliers: Mitsubishi Heavy Industries; Mitsubishi Electric; Mitsubishi Fuso; Toyota; Nippon Steel; JFE Holdings; Nippon Yusen; Sumitomo Heavy Industries; Kawasaki Heavy Industries; IHI Corporation; Japan Marine United; Mitsui Engineering & Shipbuilding; NEC; SoftBank Group; Japan Radio Company; Toshiba; Hitachi; Fujitsu; Oki Electric Industry; Howa; Toray Industries; Idemitsu Kosan; Daicel; Panasonic; Seven & I Holdings; ShinMaywa; Sony Group Corporation; Japan Steel Works; Subaru Corporation; MinebeaMitsumi; Komatsu Limited; Yamaha Motor Company; Kayaba Industry; Honda
- Foreign suppliers: Australia; France; Finland; Germany; Israel; Italy; Sweden; United Kingdom; United States
- Annual imports: US$5.68 billion (2010–2021)
- Annual exports: US$6 million (2010–2021)

Related articles
- History: Military history of Japan; List of wars involving Japan: Battle of Amami-Ōshima; 1999 East Timorese crisis; Iraq War; Operation Ocean Shield; War in Afghanistan (2001–2021); JSDF Overseas Dispatches
- Ranks: Military ranks and insignia of Japan

The Japan Self-Defense Forces (Japanese: 自衛隊, Hepburn: Jieitai; JSDF) are the military forces of Japan. (Note: The Article 9 of the Constitution of Japan forbids Japan from maintaining land, sea, and air forces, as well as other war potential. However, Japan is allowed to maintain a self-defense force and the JSDF de facto functions as the country's military.) The JSDF comprises the Japan Ground Self-Defense Force, the Japan Maritime Self-Defense Force, and the Japan Air Self-Defense Force. They are controlled by the Ministry of Defense with the prime minister as commander-in-chief.

The Japanese Constitution, which was adopted by the Supreme Command for the Allied Powers during the occupation of Japan after World War II, stipulates that Japan will never maintain a military as well as other war potential. However, rising tensions during the Cold War led to the reinterpretation of the constitution to allow for the right to self-defense, eventually leading to the creation of the Japan Self-Defense Forces in 1954 that functions as the country's de facto military.

Since the end of the Cold War, and particularly into the 21st century, increased tensions with China, North Korea, and Russia have reignited debate over the status of the JSDF and their relationship to Japanese society. The JSDF have maintained a close alliance with the United States, and have prioritized greater cooperation and partnership with Australia, India, Taiwan, South Korea, Singapore, Thailand, the Philippines, the United Kingdom, and NATO, as well as acquiring new equipment and hardware.

The JSDF is legally constrained by the Article 9 of the Constitution, which renounces Japan's right to declare war or use military force in international disputes. Japanese law limits JSDF functions to self-defense, disaster response, and peacekeeping. There have been proposals to amend the constitution to formalize the status of the JSDF. The 2015 Legislation for Peace and Security amended the law to allow Japan to exercise its right to collective self-defense to mobilize the JSDF to assist an allied country that has come under attack in an "existential crisis situation".

== History ==
=== Establishment ===
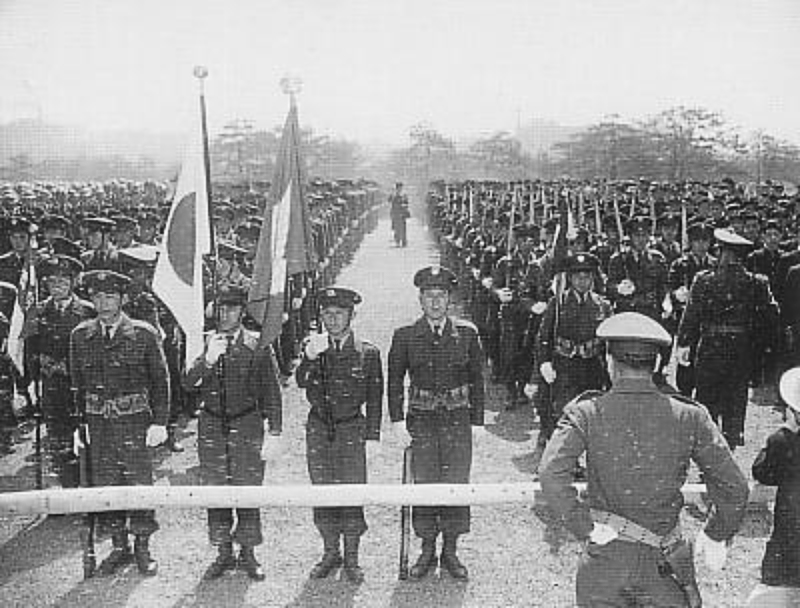
National Police Reserve, 3 May 1952

Japan surrendered to the Allied Powers on 15 August 1945, and officially exchanged instruments of surrender in Tokyo Bay on 2 September, after which Japan underwent a U.S.-led military occupation for seven years, until 28 April 1952. The Occupation was commanded by American general Douglas MacArthur, whose office was designated the Supreme Command for the Allied Powers (SCAP). In the initial phase of the occupation, from 1945 to 1946, SCAP had pursued an ambitious program of social and political reform, designed to ensure that Japan would never again be a threat to world peace.

Among other reforms, SCAP worked with Japanese leaders to completely disband the Japanese military. In addition, SCAP sought to unravel the wartime Japanese police state by breaking up the national police force into small American-style police forces controlled at the local level. SCAP also sought to empower previously marginalized groups that it believed would have a moderating effect on future militarism, legalizing the Communist and Socialist parties and encouraging the formation of labor unions. The crowning achievement of the first phase of the occupation was the promulgation at SCAP's behest in 1947 of a new Constitution of Japan. Article 9 of the Japanese Constitution explicitly disavows war as an instrument of state policy and promises that Japan will never maintain a military as well as other war potential.

By this time, Cold War tensions were already ramping up in Europe, where the Soviet occupation of Eastern European countries led Winston Churchill to give his 1946 "Iron Curtain" speech, as well as in Asia, where the tide was turning in favor of the Communists in the Chinese Civil War. These shifts in the geopolitical environment led to a profound shift in U.S. government and Allied Occupation thinking about Japan, and rather than focusing on punishing and weakening Japan for its wartime transgressions, the focus shifted to rebuilding and strengthening Japan as a potential ally in the emerging global Cold War, leading to a reversal of many earlier Occupation policies that has come to be known as the "Reverse Course". As part of this shift, MacArthur and other U.S. leaders began to question the wisdom of having insisted upon Japan renouncing all military capabilities. These sentiments were intensified in 1950 as Occupation troops began to be moved to the Korean War (1950–1953) theater. This left Japan defenseless and vulnerable, and caused U.S. and Japanese conservative leaders alike to becoming increasingly aware of a pressing need to enter a mutual defense relationship with the United States in order to guarantee Japan's external security in the absence of a Japanese military. Meanwhile, on the Japanese domestic front, rampant inflation, continuing hunger and poverty, and the rapid expansion of leftist parties and labor unions led Occupation authorities to fear that Japan was ripe for communist exploitation or even a communist revolution and to believe that conservative and anti-communist forces in Japan needed to be strengthened. Accordingly, in July 1950, Occupation authorities authorized the establishment of a National Police Reserve (警察予備隊, Keisatsu-yobitai), consisting of 75,000 men equipped with light infantry weapons. In 1952, the Coastal Safety Force (海上警備隊, Kaijō Keibitai), the waterborne counterpart of NPR, was also founded.

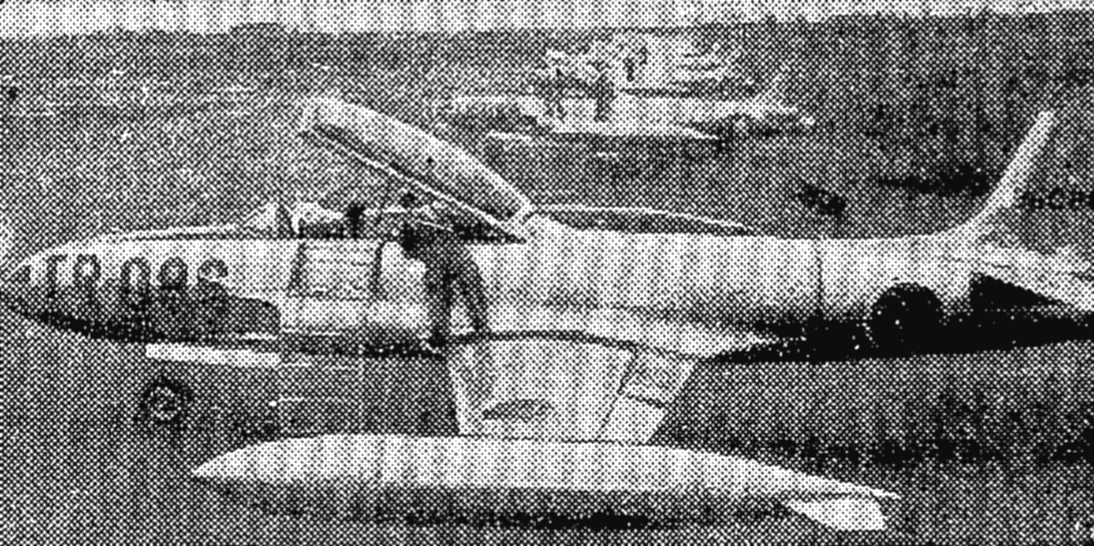
JASDF Lockheed T-33 jet trainers on 15 May 1955

The Security Treaty Between the United States and Japan was signed on 8 September 1951 and came into force on 28 April 1952. While the treaty allowed the United States to maintain military bases in Japan, it did not obligate US forces to defend Japan should Japan come under attack. As left-wing protests in Japan remained a major concern to Japanese and American leaders alike, the treaty explicitly allowed US military forces based in Japan to put down "internal riots and disturbances" in Japan. In addition, in mid-1952, the National Police Reserve was expanded to 110,000 men and named the "National Safety Forces". Along with it, the Coastal Safety Force was moved to the National Safety Agency to start a de facto navy.

Article 9 of the Japanese Constitution

- (1) Aspiring sincerely to an international peace based on justice and order, the Japanese people forever renounce war as a sovereign right of the nation and the threat or use of force as means of settling international disputes.
- (2) In order to accomplish the aim of the preceding paragraph, land, sea, and air forces, as well as another war potential, will never be maintained. The right of belligerency of the state will not be recognized.

Meanwhile, the Japanese government began a long and ongoing process of gradually reinterpreting Article 9 of the Japanese Constitution to allow greater and greater military capabilities, under the interpretation that Article 9 disallowed offensive warmaking capabilities but did not necessarily deny the nation the inherent right to self-defense. These reinterpretations were avidly encouraged by the government of United States, which hoped that by remilitarizing Japan would be able to take up more of the burden for its own self-defense. This reinterpretation of Article 9 cleared the way for the creation of a Defense Agency and the transformation of the National Security Force into a "Self-Defense Force" that would be a military in all but name.

On 1 July 1954, the National Security Board was reorganized as the Defense Agency, and the National Security Force was reorganized afterwards as the Japan Ground Self-Defense Force (de facto post-war Japanese Army), the Coastal Safety Force was reorganized as the Japan Maritime Self-Defense Force (de facto post-war Japanese Navy), and the Japan Air Self-Defense Force (de facto post-war Japanese Air Force) was established as a new branch of JSDF. General Keizō Hayashi was appointed the first chairman of the Joint Staff Council—professional head of the three branches. The enabling legislation for this was the 1954 Self-Defense Forces Act (Act No. 165 of 1954).

The Far East Air Force, U.S. Air Force, announced on 6 January 1955 that 85 aircraft would be turned over to the fledgling Japanese air force on about 15 January, the first equipment of the new force.

On 19 January 1960, the United States and Japan signed a revised version of the US-Japan Security Treaty which corrected the unequal status of Japan in the 1951 treaty by adding mutual defense obligations and which remains in force today. The U.S. is required to give prior notice to Japan of any mobilization of US forces based in Japan. The US is also prohibited from exerting any power on domestic issues within Japan. The treaty obligates Japan and the United States to assist each other if there is an armed attack in territories administered by Japan. Because it states that any attack against Japan or the United States in Japanese territory would be dangerous to each country's peace and safety, the revised treaty requires Japan and the United States to maintain capacities to resist common armed attacks; thus, it explains the need for US military bases in Japan. This had the effect of establishing a military alliance between Japan and the United States. The revised treaty has never been amended since 1960, and thus has lasted longer in its original form than any other alliance between two great powers since the Peace of Westphalia treaties in 1648.

Although possession of nuclear weapons is not explicitly forbidden in the constitution, Japan does not own any. The Atomic Energy Basic Law of 1956 limits research, development, and use of nuclear power to peaceful uses only. Beginning in 1956, national policy embodied non-nuclear principles that forbade the nation from possessing or manufacturing nuclear weapons or allowing them to be introduced into its territories. In 1976, Japan ratified the Treaty on the Non-Proliferation of Nuclear Weapons (adopted by the United Nations Security Council in 1968) and reiterated its intention never to "develop, use, or allow the transportation of nuclear weapons through its territory"; nonetheless, because of its advanced technological capabilities and large number of operating nuclear power plants, Japan is considered "nuclear capable", i.e., it could develop usable nuclear weapons within one year if the political situation changes significantly. Thus, many analysts consider Japan a de facto nuclear state. Japan is often said to be a "screwdriver's turn" away from possessing nuclear weapons or possessing a "bomb in the basement".

In 1983, Japanese prime minister Yasuhiro Nakasone pledged to make Japan an "unsinkable aircraft carrier in the Pacific", assisting the United States in defending against the threat of Soviet bombers.

In 1990, the United States called on its ally Japan for assistance in the Gulf War. However, then-current Japanese interpretation of Article 9 forbade the overseas dispatch of Japanese military troops. Accordingly, Japan contributed $9 billion in monetary support.

On 28 May 1999, the Regional Affairs Law was enacted. It allows Japan to automatically participate as "rear support" if the United States wages war under "regional affairs".

=== 21st century ===
The Anti-Terrorism Special Measures Law was passed on 29 October 2001. It allows the JSDF to contribute by itself to international efforts to the prevention and eradication of terrorism. While on duty, the JSDF can use weapons to protect itself and others who come under its control. Previously Japan's policy was non-involvement.

In between the Gulf War and the start of the Iraq War in 2003, the Japanese government revised its interpretation of Article 9, and thus during the Iraq War, Japan was able to dispatch noncombat ground forces in a logistical support role in support of U.S. operations in Iraq.

On 27 March 2004, the Japan Defense Agency activated the Special Operations Group with the mandate under the JGSDF as its Counter-terrorist unit.

On 8 June 2006, the Cabinet of Japan endorsed a bill elevating the Defense Agency (防衛庁) under the Cabinet Office to full-fledged cabinet-level Ministry of Defense (防衛省). This was passed by the National Diet in December 2006 and has been enforced since 9 January 2007.

Section 2 of Article 3 of the Self Defense Forces Act was revised on 9 January 2007. JSDF activities abroad were elevated from "miscellaneous regulations" to "basic duties". This fundamentally changed the nature of the JSDF because its activities were no longer solely defensive. JMSDF ships can be dispatched worldwide such as in activities against pirates. The JSDF's first postwar overseas base was established in Djibouti (July 2010). On 18 September 2015, the National Diet enacted the 2015 Japanese military legislation, a series of laws that allow Japan's Self-Defense Forces to defend allies in combat. The JSDF may provide material support to allies engaged in combat overseas. The new law also allows JSDF troops to defend weapons platforms belonging to Japan's allies if doing so would somehow contribute to Japan's defense. The justification being that not defending or coming to the aid of an ally under attack weakens alliances and endangers Japan. These were Japan's broadest changes to its defense laws since World War II. The JSDF Act was amended in 2015 to make it illegal for JSDF personnel/staff to participate in collective insubordination or to command forces without authority or in violation of orders, which was stated to be the reason Japan was involved in China in World War II. A Credit Suisse survey published in 2015 ranked Japan as the world's fourth most-powerful military behind Russia, China, and United States. Since March 2016, Japan's Legislation for Peace and Security enables seamless responses of the JSDF to any situation to protect the lives and livelihood of Japanese citizens. It also increases proactive contributions to peace and security in the world and deepens cooperation with partners. This enhanced the Japan-US alliance as global partners to promote peace and security in the region and the international community.

Japan activated the Amphibious Rapid Deployment Brigade, its first marine unit since World War II, on 7 April 2018. It is trained to counter invaders from occupying Japanese islands. The Ministry of Defense said that beginning 1 October 2018, the maximum age for enlisted personnel and non-commissioned officer applicants would be raised from 26 to 32 to secure "a stable supply of Self-Defense Forces [military] personnel amid a declining pool of recruits due to the recently declining birth rate". In March 2019, the Ministry of Defense intended to establish its first regional cyber protection unit in the Western Army of the Japan Ground Self-Defense Force (JGSDF) to safeguard defense communications from cyber attacks, such as for personnel deployed on remote islands with no established secure lines. The Ministry of Defense has been developing supersonic glide bombs to strengthen the defense of Japan's remote islands, including the Senkaku Islands. The anti-surface strike capability will be used to help the Amphibious Rapid Deployment Brigade's landing and recapture operations of remote islands.

British troops of the Honourable Artillery Company (HAC) conducted a field exercise together for the first time with Japanese GSDF soldiers in Oyama, Shizuoka prefecture on 2 October 2018. This also marked the first time in history that foreign soldiers other than Americans have had field exercises on Japanese soil. The purpose was to improve their strategic partnership and security cooperation. The JGSDF and the Indian Army conducted their first joint military exercise in the Indian state of Mizoram from 27 October to 18 November 2018, practicing anti-terror drills and improving bilateral cooperation between 60 Japanese and Indian officers. From 29 October to 2 November 2018, Japan and the United States conducted the largest military exercise around Japan to date, known as Keen Sword. It included 57,000 sailors, marines and airmen. Of those, 47,000 service members were from the JSDF and 10,000 from the U.S. Armed Forces. A naval supply ship and frigate of the Royal Canadian Navy also participated. There were simulations of air combat, ballistic missile defense, and amphibious landings.

Japan unveiled the 84-meter long, 2,950-ton Taigei-class submarine, Japan's first submarine powered by lithium-ion batteries, on 4 October 2018. It was developed by Mitsubishi Heavy Industries. The Japan Maritime Self-Defense Force used it for the first time in March 2020.

The Japanese government approved the first-ever JGSDF dispatch to a peacekeeping operation that was not led by the United Nations. Two JGSDF officers monitored a cease-fire between Israel and Egypt at the Multinational Force and Observers command in the Sinai Peninsula from 19 April till 30 November 2019. Defense Minister Takeshi Iwaya announced plans to deploy Type 12 surface-to-ship missiles in March 2020. The missiles have a range of 300 km and would be used to protect the southern Ryukyu Islands. Japan is also developing high-speed gliding missiles with a range of 1000 km.

On 10 September 2020, Japan and India signed a military pact called the Acquisition and Cross-Servicing Agreement (ACSA). The pact enables the exchange of logistical support and supplies. The purpose is to encourage closer cooperation between the two countries and to deter Chinese aggression in Asia. Japan already had such agreements with Australia, Canada, France, UK and USA.

On 5 May 2022, Japan and the United Kingdom signed a defensive partnership which deepens military ties to counter "autocratic, coercive powers" in Europe and the Asia-Pacific region. Prime Ministers Fumio Kishida and Boris Johnson both condemned the Russian invasion of Ukraine.

On 5 May 2022, Japan and the United States signed an agreement. Japanese prime minister Fumio Kishida and U.S. president Joe Biden met together in Tokyo.

Since the post-February 2022 Russian invasion of Ukraine, there has been growing military coordination between China and Russia. This has resulted in an uptick of military activity around Japan.

On 4 August 2022, the Japanese government lodged formal protests to Beijing when five missiles landed near Hateruma in Japan's Exclusive Economic Zone. These Chinese missile launches and military exercises occurred in response to the 2022 visit by Nancy Pelosi to Taiwan.

On 22 October 2022, Japan and Australia signed a new bilateral security agreement that includes military, intelligence and cybersecurity cooperation. It is an upgrade to the 2007 Joint Declaration on Security Cooperation. This is the first time that Japan made such a pact with a country other than the United States.

On 16 December 2022, Japan announced a major policy shift from its exclusively defense-oriented posture by acquiring counterstrike capabilities to hit enemy bases and command-and-control nodes with longer-range standoff missiles and a defense budget increase to 2% of GDP (¥43 trillion, equivalent to approximately US$315 billion) by 2027. Japan will acquire a variety of systems, both domestically and through imports. This includes an Upgraded Type 12 SSMs and Tomahawk land-attack cruise missiles, both of which will be delivered in FY2025. Domestic hypersonic glide vehicles and hypersonic missiles are planned to be delivered for the 2030s.

The JSDF carried out its first international emergency relief operation with NATO in March 2023, upon Turkey and NATO's request in response to the Turkey–Syria earthquakes in southeastern Turkey. Also in March, Japan announced a contribution of US$30 million to NATO's CAP Trust Fund to assist Ukraine.

NATO and Japan commit to dialogues and cooperation for international rules-based order, and have signed the Individually Tailored Partnership Programme (ITPP) "to tackle cross-regional challenges and shared security interests". In July 2023, NATO secretary general Jens Stoltenberg stated that "security is not regional, security is global" and that "no other partner is closer to NATO than Japan".

At the end of December 2025, Prime Minister Sanae Takaichi's cabinet significantly increased Japan's defense budget as a strategic shift, due to heightened tensions in the region.

Defence Minister Gen Nakatani attended the partners session of the NATO defence ministers meeting on 17 October 2024, stating "to further promote cooperation between Japan and NATO as well as NATO and IP4". He also noted on progress in cooperation in cyber, space, communications, cyber defence exercises, and on sharing of classified information with NATO.

On 15 January 2025, Japan became the first among NATO's Indo-Pacific partners to inaugurate a full-time ambassador to NATO, with focuses to "cooperate with NATO more efficiently and to contribute to further enhancing and developing the relationship between Japan and NATO in the future".

On 11 March 2025, it was announced the Joint Operations Command would be fully established by March 24.

On 31 March 2026, the Ministry of Defense announced the first deployment of the Type 25 Surface-to-Ship Missile, with a range of 1,000 km, and the Type 25 HVGP, with a range of several hundred kilometers, marking the first concrete realization of Japan's counterstrike capability.

On April 21, 2026, Japanese Prime Minister Sanae Takaichi approved exporting advanced military equipment to 17 countries, marking a shift in Japan’s pacifist arms policy amid rising Chinese activity in the South China Sea.

== Structure ==
Standard of the Prime Minister

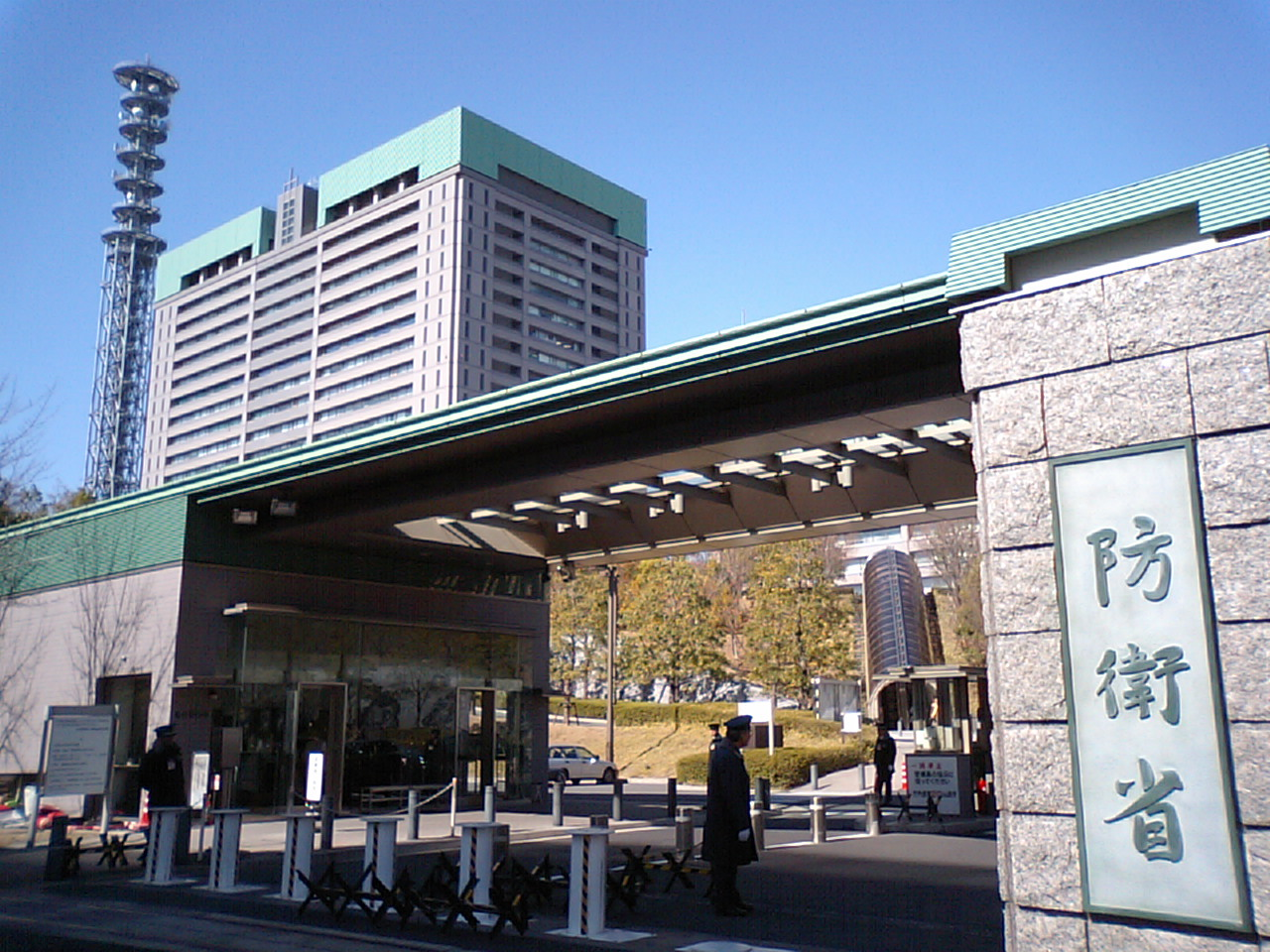
The Japanese Ministry of Defense

The prime minister is the commander-in-chief of the Japan Self-Defense Forces. Military authority runs from the prime minister to the cabinet-level minister of defense of the Japanese Ministry of Defense. (Note: Previously, the director-general of the Defense Agency (防衛庁, Bōei-chō) reported to the Prime Minister. The Defense Agency ceased to exist with the establishment of the cabinet-level Ministry of Defense in 2007.)

The Prime Minister and Minister of Defense are advised by the chief of staff, Joint Staff (統合幕僚長, Tōgō Bakuryō-chō), who heads the Joint Staff (統合幕僚監部, Tōgō Bakuryō Kanbu). The Joint Staff includes a Senior Enlisted Advisor to the Chief of Staff, Joint Staff, the Vice Chief of Staff, Joint Staff, an Administrative Vice Chief of Staff, as well as a number of departments and special staff offices. Each service branch is headed by its respective Chief of Staff: the Chief of Staff of the Japan Ground Self-Defense Force (JGSDF), the Japan Maritime Self-Defense Force (JMSDF), and the Japan Air Self-Defense Force (JASDF).

The Chief of Staff, Joint Staff, a four-star Admiral or General, is the highest-ranking military officer of the Japan Self-Defense Forces and serves as the principal military adviser to the Prime Minister and the Minister of Defense. Until 2025, the Chief of Staff also exercised operational command authority over the Self-Defense Forces, executing the orders of the Minister of Defense under the direction of the Prime Minister.

In 2025, the Joint Operations Command was established under a four-star Commander, JSDF Joint Operations Command, (ja) and operational command authority was transferred to that office. The Chief of Staff, Joint Staff remains the senior uniformed officer and continues to serve in an advisory capacity to the civilian leadership.

The chain of operational command now runs from the Minister of Defense to the Commander, JSDF Joint Operations Command and thence to the commanders of the respective operational commands. The Chiefs of Staff of the JGSDF, JMSDF, and JASDF retain administrative control over their respective services.

=== Unified units ===
- JSDF Joint Operations Command
- JSDF Intelligence Security Command
- JSDF Cyber Defense Command
- JSDF Maritime Transport Group

=== Service branches ===
- Japan Ground Self-Defense Force
- Japan Maritime Self-Defense Force
- Japan Air Self-Defense Force

=== Service units ===
- Five armies
  - Northern Army, headquartered in Sapporo, Hokkaido
  - North Eastern Army, headquartered in Sendai, Miyagi
  - Eastern Army, headquartered in Nerima, Tokyo
  - Central Army, headquartered in Itami, Hyōgo
  - Western Army, headquartered at Kumamoto, Kumamoto
- Five maritime districts
  - Yokosuka District
  - Kure District
  - Sasebo District
  - Maizuru District
  - Ominato District
- Four air defense forces
  - Northern Air Defense Force: Misawa, Aomori
  - Central Air Defense Force: Iruma, Saitama
  - Western Air Defense Force: Kasuga, Fukuoka
  - Southwestern Air Defense Force: Naha, Okinawa

=== Special forces units ===
- Special Operations Group of JGSDF
- Special Boarding Unit (SBU) of JMSDF

== Defense policy ==
=== National Security Council ===
On 4 December 2013, the National Security Council was established, with the aim of establishing a forum which will undertake strategic discussions under the Prime Minister on a regular basis and as necessary on various national security issues and exercising a strong political leadership.

=== National Security Strategy ===
On 17 December 2013, National Security Strategy was adopted by Cabinet decision. NSS sets the basic orientation of diplomatic and defense policies related to national security. NSS presents the content of the policy of "Proactive Contribution to Peace" in a concrete manner and promotes better understanding of Japan's national security policy.

On 25 July 2018, the Japanese government settled on a 3-year strategy to counter possible cyberattacks against key parts of the nation's infrastructure ahead of the 2020 Tokyo Olympic and Paralympic Games.

In December 2022, Japan announced a new national security strategy. This new strategy would increase all "national security-related spending" to 2 percent of Japan's GDP, while increasing the military budget from 5.4 trillion yen ($40 billion) in 2022 to 8.9 trillion yen ($66 billion) by 2027, up 65%. This would lead to a spending a total of around 43 trillion yen ($321 billion) between 2023 and 2027, up 56% from 2019 to 2023. Japan also has stated its plans to invest in counter-strike capabilities, including buying US Tomahawk cruise missiles and developing its own weapons systems, including Hyper Velocity Gliding Projectile, Japan's first de facto ballistic missile carrying hypersonic glide vehicle with a range of 3,000 km, and the improved Type 12 cruise missile with a range of more than 1000 km. As the first concrete implementation of this strategy, deployment of the Type 25 SSM, with a range of 1,000 km, and the Type 25 HVGP, with a range of several hundred kilometers, began on 31 March 2026.

=== Constitutional limitations ===
Article 9 of the Japanese Constitution prohibits Japan from establishing a military or solving international conflicts through violence. However, there has been widespread public debate since 2000 about the possibility of reducing or deleting Article 9 from the constitution. The article is interpreted as meaning that armed forces are legitimate for self-defense. This limits the capabilities of the JSDF as primarily for national defense. Thus, there were no long-range attack capabilities until 2010s. Yet, as of 2022, Japan was developing multiple long-range missiles such as ballistic missiles and cruise missiles. However, due to the constraints of the Constitution, these are not for preemptive attacks on other countries, but for counter-attacks.

=== Budget ===
In 1976, then prime minister Miki Takeo announced defense spending should be maintained within 1% of Japan's gross domestic product (GDP), a ceiling that was observed until 1986. As of 2005, Japan's military budget equalled about 3% of the national budget; about half is spent on personnel costs, while the rest is for weapons programs, maintenance and operating costs. As of 2011, Japan has the world's eighth-largest military budget.

The published military budget of Japan for 2015 was 4.98 trillion yen (approximately US$42 billion, and roughly 1% of Japanese GDP), a rise of 2.8 percent on the previous year.

Further information: List of countries with highest military expenditures

Military spending, top 25 countries by % GDP, 2024
Country	% GDP spent on military
Ukraine	34.5
Israel	8.8
Algeria	8.0
Saudi Arabia	7.3
Russia	7.1
Myanmar	6.8
Oman	5.6
Armenia	5.5
Azerbaijan	5.0
Kuwait	4.8
Jordan	4.8
Burkina Faso	4.7
Mali	4.2
Poland	4.2
Burundi	3.8
Brunei	3.6
Morocco	3.5
United States	3.4
Estonia	3.4
Colombia	3.4
Latvia	3.3
Greece	3.1
Lithuania	3.1
Chad	3.0
Kyrgyzstan	3.0

Military spending, top 25 countries by PPP, 2024
Country	$billions spent on military
United States	997
China	567
Russia	401
India	308
Ukraine	183
South Korea	96
Germany	99
Japan	91
France	91
United Kingdom	86
Brazil	64
Poland	62
Italy	60
Turkey	59
Indonesia	47
Colombia	43
Mexico	40
Spain	39
Australia	31
Canada	31
Netherlands	21
Philippines	21
Romania	21
Greece	17
Malaysia	14

== Anti-ballistic missile deployment ==
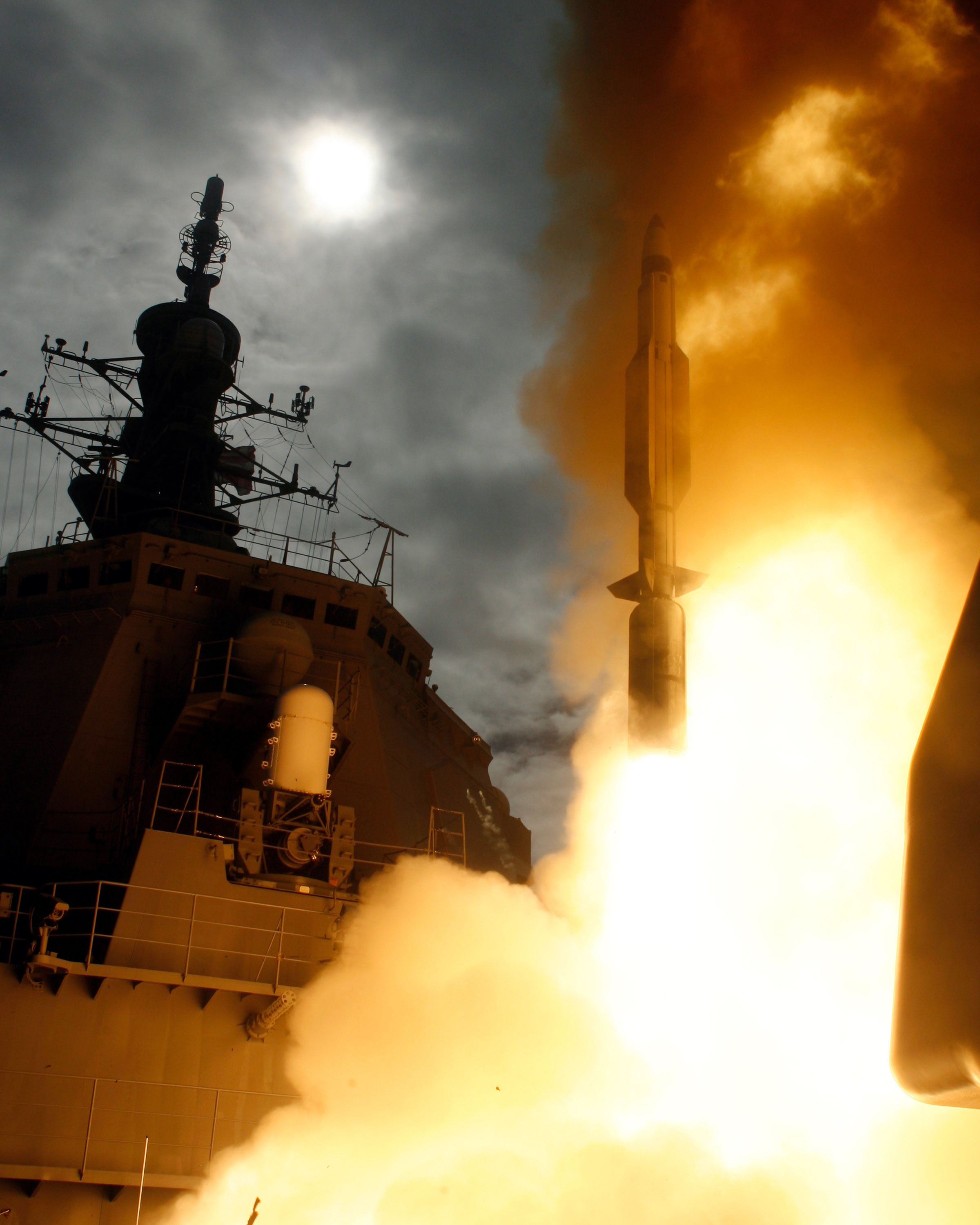
JS Kongō (DDG-173) firing a Standard Missile 3 anti-ballistic missile to intercept a target missile launched from the Pacific Missile Range Facility on December 17, 2007

After the North Korean Kwangmyŏngsŏng-1 satellite launching in August 1998, which some regarded as a ballistic missile test, the Japanese government decided to participate in the American anti-ballistic missile (ABM) defense program. In August 1999, Japan, Germany and the US governments signed a Memorandum of Understanding of joint research and development on the Aegis Ballistic Missile Defense System. In 2003, the Japanese government decided to deploy three types of ABM system, air defense vehicles, sea-based Aegis and land-based PAC-3 ABM.

The four Kongō class Aegis destroyers of the Japan Maritime Self-Defense Force were modified to accommodate the ABM operational capability. On 17 December 2007, JS Kongō successfully shot down a mock ballistic missile by its SM-3 Block IA, off the coast of Hawaii. The first PAC-3 (upgraded version of the MIM-104 Patriot) firing test by the Japan Air Self-Defense Force was carried out in New Mexico on 17 September 2008. PAC-3 units are deployed in 6 bases near metropolises, including Tokyo, Osaka, Nagoya, Sapporo, Misawa and Okinawa.

Japan participates in the co-research and development of four Aegis components with the US: the nose cone, the infrared seeker, the kinetic warhead, and the second-stage rocket motor.

On 30 July 2018, Japan picked Lockheed Martin Corp to build a $1.2 billion radar for two ground-based Aegis ballistic missile defense stations. These are meant to guard against missile strikes. On the same day, Japan's Defense Ministry said to be considering to withdraw PAC3 missile interceptor units from the country's northern and western region amid an easing of tensions with North Korea. Ministry officials told that North Korea is less likely to fire ballistic missiles after it held a summit with the United States the previous month. But the officials also said the ministry will maintain its order to destroy any incoming missiles. They added that the ministry will be ready to quickly redeploy the PAC3 units if the situation changes.

On 31 August 2022, the Japan Ministry of Defense announced that Japan Maritime Self-Defense Force (JMSDF) will operate two "Aegis system equipped ships" (Japanese: イージス・システム搭載艦) to replace its earlier cancellation of the Aegis Ashore program, commissioning one ship by the end of fiscal year 2027, and the other by the end of FY2028. The budget for design and other related expenses are to be submitted in the form of "item requests", without specific amounts, and the initial procurement of the lead items are expected to clear legislation by FY2023. Construction is to begin in the following year of FY2024. At 20,000 tons each, both vessels will be the largest surface combatant warships operated by the JMSDF.

== Amphibious force ==
In light of tensions over the Senkaku Islands, Japan began to assemble the Amphibious Rapid Deployment Brigade in 2016, its first marine unit since World War II, designed to conduct amphibious operations and to recover any Japanese islands taken by an adversary.

The Amphibious Rapid Deployment Brigade was activated on 7 April 2018, in a ceremony at JGSDF's Camp Ainoura in Sasebo, on the southwest island of Kyushu. The brigade was established to protect and defend Japanese or Japanese-claimed islands along the edge of the East China Sea as Chinese defense spending and interest in the area rose. Related to the defense of the southwestern islands, Japan has initiated a program to convert its two-ship Izumo-class destroyer fleet from "helicopter carrier destroyers" to aircraft carriers with a capability to launch the F-35B – to be the first Japanese aircraft carriers since World War II.

== Unarmed combat system ==
The JSDF's self-defence system is known as Jieitaikakutōjutsu (meaning Japan Self-Defense Force Combatives or Self-Defense Forces martial arts). The first system was adopted in 1959, based on the bayonet and knife techniques used during Imperial Army times with an added hand-to-hand combat curriculum based on Nippon Kempo and Tomiki-Ryu Aikido (future Shodokan Aikido). The system was refined in 2006 to 2007, and the new system introduced in 2008 placed a new emphasis on throws and chokeholds, and more aggressive knife defense training.

== Missions and deployments ==
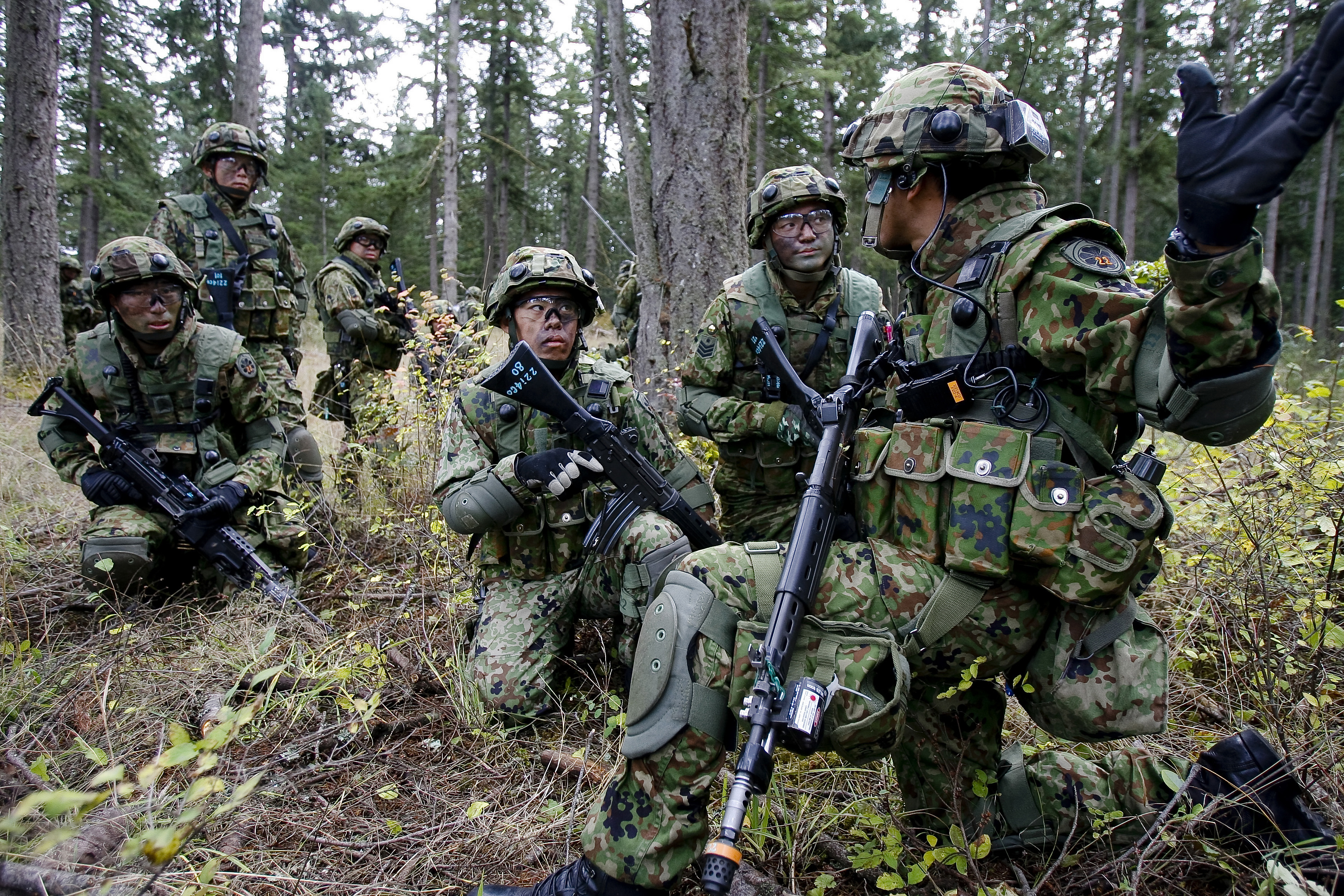
JGSDF soldiers during a training exercise

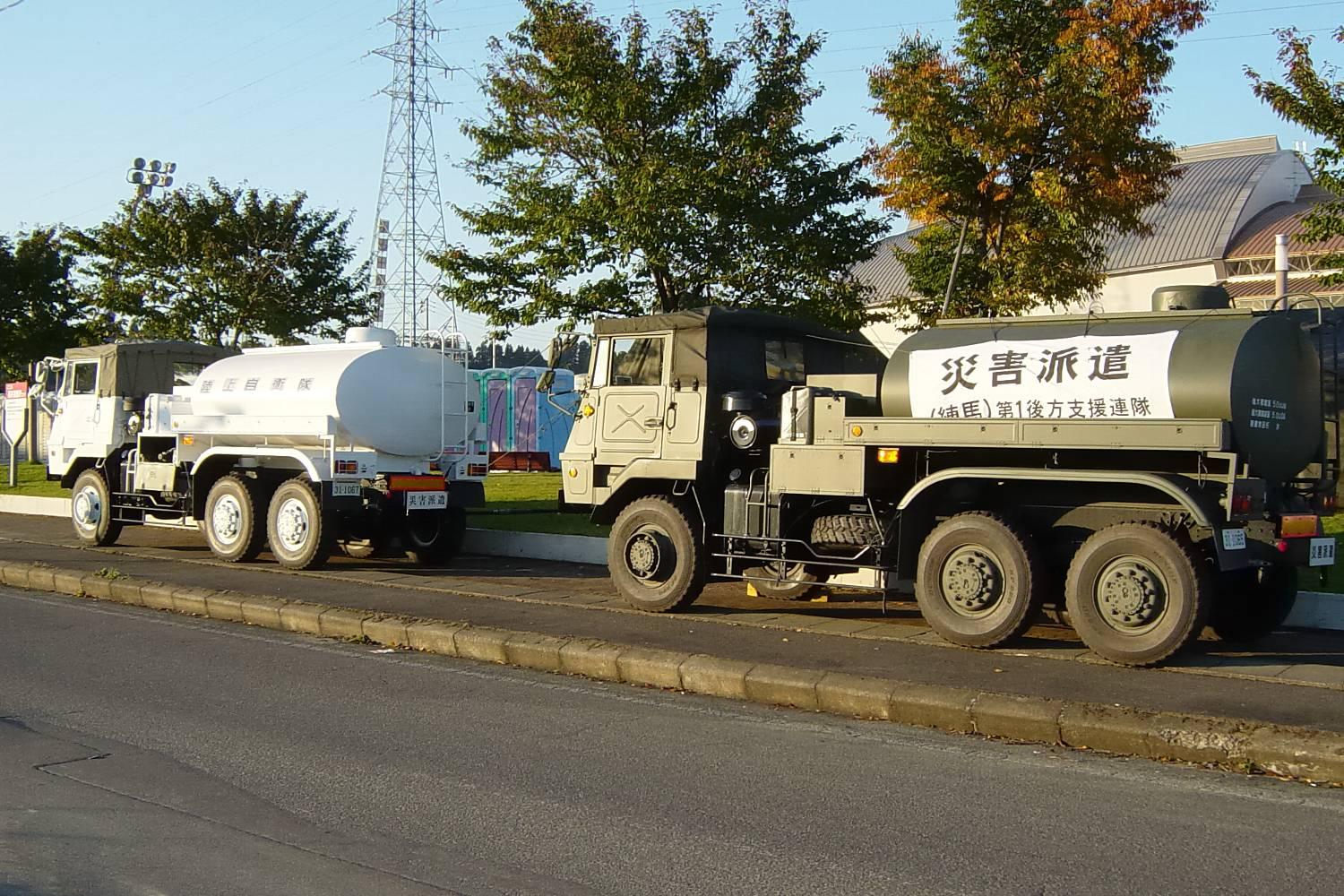
Disaster relief, JGSDF

The outer outline of specified quotas for personnel and equipment for each force that were deemed necessary to meet its tasks. Particular elements of each force's mission were also identified. The JGSDF was to defend against any ground invasion and threats to internal security, be able to deploy to any part of the nation, and protect the bases of all three services of the Self-Defense Forces. The JMSDF was to meet invasion by sea, sweep mines, patrol and survey the surrounding waters, and guard and defend coastal waters, ports, bays, and major straits. The JASDF was to provide aircraft, missile interception, fighter units for maritime and ground operations, air reconnaissance and transport for all forces, and maintain airborne and stationary early warning units.

The JSDF's disaster relief role is defined in Article 83 of the Self-Defense Forces Act of 1954, requiring units to respond to calls for assistance from prefectural governors to aid in fire suppression, search and rescue, and flood fighting through the reinforcement of embankments and levees. The JSDF has not been used in police actions, nor is it likely to be assigned any internal security tasks in the future.

In late June and early July 2014, Prime Minister Shinzo Abe and his cabinet agreed to lift the long-term ban on engaging Japanese troops abroad, a prohibition dating to the end of the Second World War, in a bid to strengthen Japan's position against growing Chinese military aggression and North Korean nuclear weapons testing. Though these actions were considered to be in accordance with article 9 of the Japanese constitution forbidding the use of war as a means of settling disputes, the government signaled that it may seek to, in the future, reinterpret the prohibition.

=== Peacekeeping ===
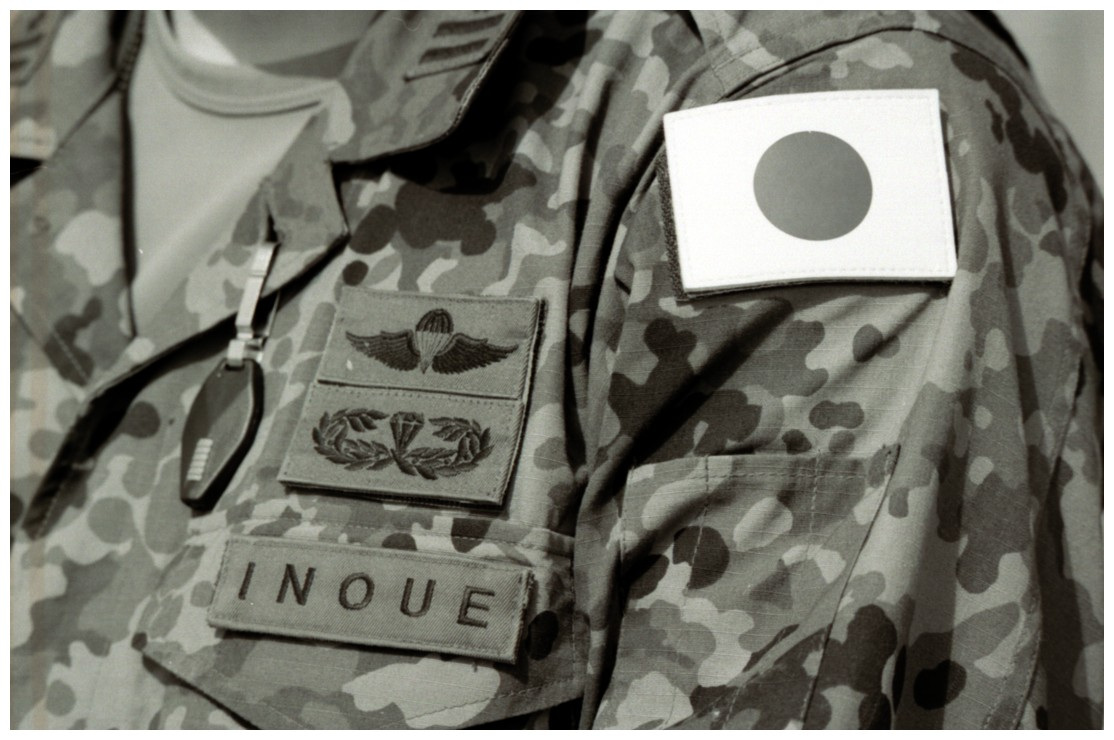
Close-up view of the uniform of a Japan Self-Defense Force soldier serving in Baghdad, Iraq (April 2005)

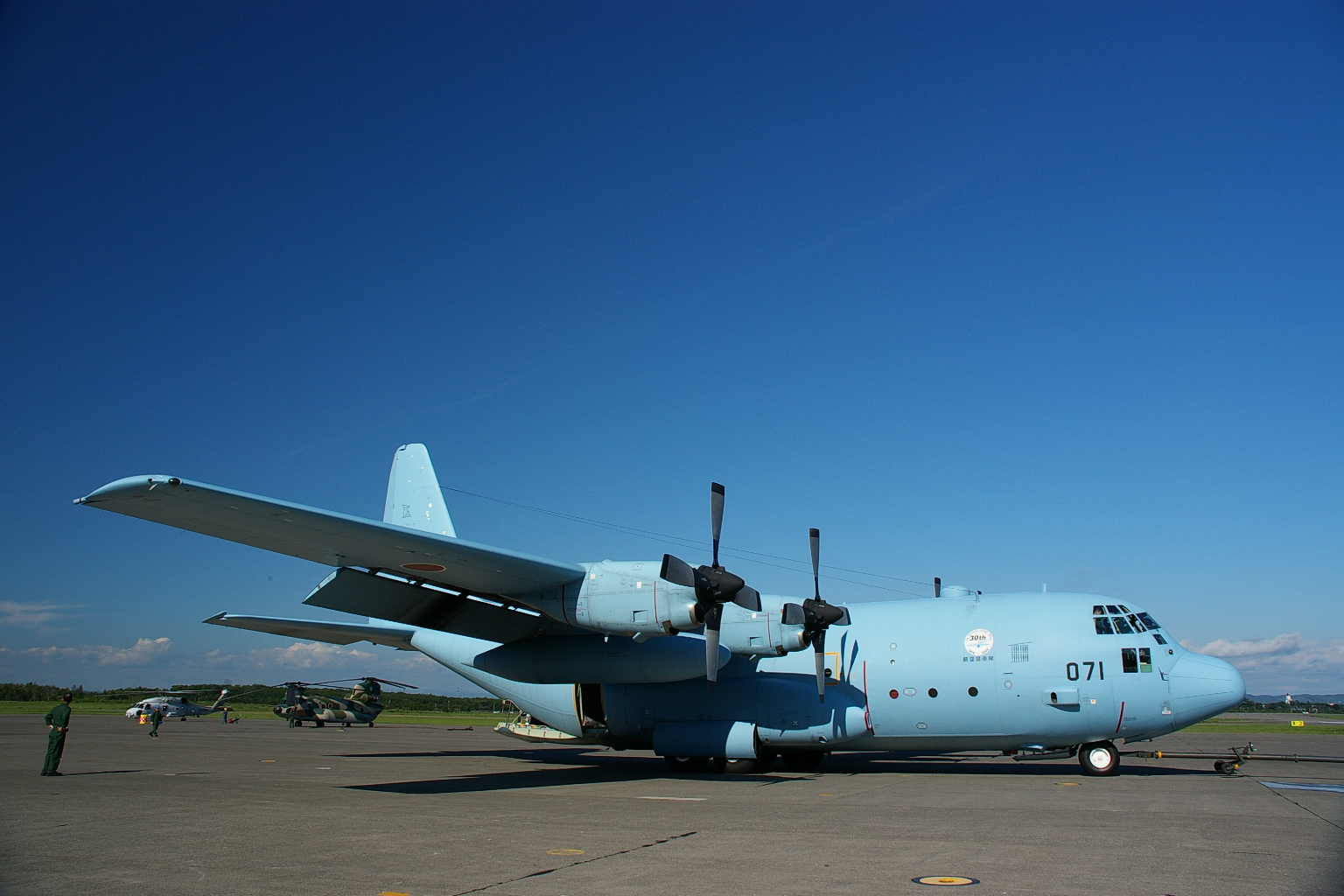
JASDF C-130 Hercules supporting the Japanese mission in Iraq

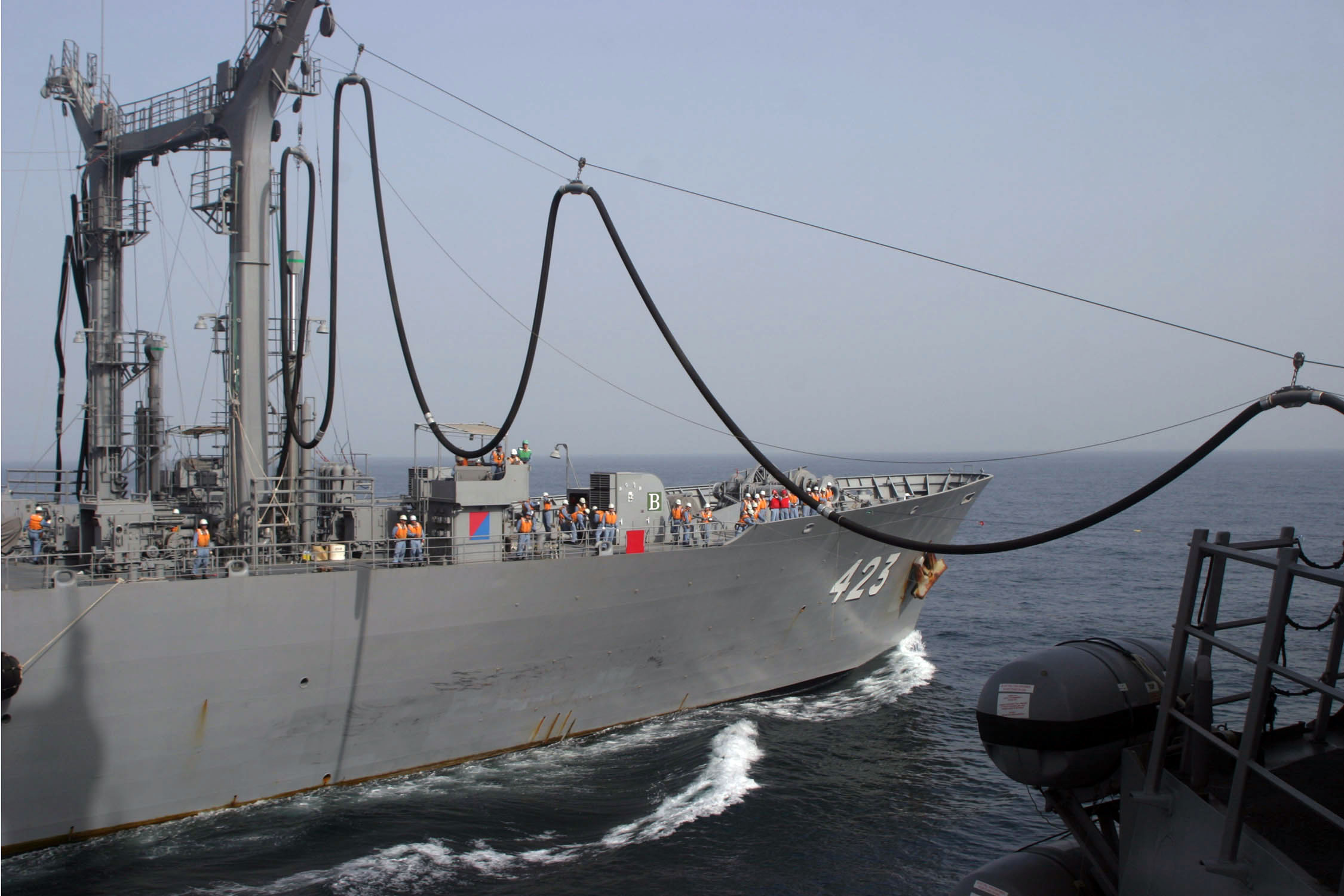
Support in the Indian Ocean 2001-2010 (supply ship JS Tokiwa refueling USS Decatur)

In June 1992, the National Diet passed a UN Peacekeeping Cooperation Law which permitted the JSDF to participate in UN medical, refugee repatriation, logistical support, infrastructural reconstruction, election-monitoring, and policing operations under strictly limited conditions.

The non-combatant participation of the JSDF in the United Nations Transitional Authority in Cambodia (UNTAC) in conjunction with Japanese diplomatic efforts contributed to the successful implementation of the 1991 Paris Peace Accords for Cambodia.

Chief Cabinet Secretary Nobutaka Machimura had stated that discussions with Defense Minister Shigeru Ishiba and Foreign Minister Masahiko Komura were taking place regarding the possibility of creating a permanent law for JSDF forces to be deployed in peacekeeping missions outside Japan. The adoption of a permanent peacekeeping law has been considered by the government, according to the Mainichi Daily News. In 2014, the LDP did not make progress due to concerns from Komeito that JSDF forces can be sent to a peacekeeping operation where Japan is not involved.

In 2004, the Japanese government ordered a deployment of troops to Iraq at the behest of the United States. A contingent of the Japan Self-Defense Forces was sent to assist in the U.S.-led Reconstruction of Iraq. This controversial deployment marked a significant turning point in Japan's history, as it marked the first time since the end of World War II that Japan sent troops abroad except for a few minor UN peacekeeping deployments. Public opinion regarding this deployment was sharply divided, especially given that Japan's military is constitutionally structured as solely a self-defense force, and operating in Iraq seemed at best tenuously connected to that mission. The Koizumi administration, however, decided to send troops to respond to a request from the US. Even though they deployed with their weapons, because of constitutional restraints, the troops were protected by Japanese Special Forces troops and Australian units. The Japanese soldiers were there purely for humanitarian and reconstruction work, and were prohibited from opening fire on Iraqi insurgents unless they were fired on first. Japanese forces withdrew from Iraq in 2006.

Japan provided logistics units for the United Nations Disengagement Observer Force Zone, which supervises the buffer zone in the Golan Heights, monitors Israeli and Syrian military activities, and assists local civilians.

Japanese forces are frequent among the international disaster relief teams, with deployments in Rwanda (1994), Honduras (1998), Turkey (1999), West Timor (1999–2000), Afghanistan (2001), Iraq (2003), Iran (2003–2004), Thailand (2004–2005), Indonesia (2005), Russia (2005), Pakistan (2005), Indonesia (2006), Indonesia (2009), Haiti and Chile (2010), and Nepal (2015). In the aftermath of an earthquake in Haiti, Japan deployed a contingent of troops, including engineers with bulldozers and heavy machinery, to assist the United Nations Stabilization Mission in Haiti. Their duties were peacekeeping, removal of rubble, and the reconstruction of roads and buildings.

Self-Defense Forces have conducted overseas activities such as dispatching UN peacekeepers to Cambodia. In 2003, Japan created a law to deal with armed attacks and amended the Self-Defense Forces law. In 2004, Japan dispatched for two and a half years to the Samawa district of southern Iraq under the Special Measures for Iraqi Recovery Support Act.

==== Naval and air overseas deployments ====
The Japan Maritime Self-Defense Force deployed a force off the coast of Somalia to protect Japanese ships from Somali pirates. The force consists of two destroyers (crewed by approximately 400 sailors), patrol helicopters, speedboats, eight officers of the Japan Coast Guard to collect criminal evidence and handle piracy suspects, a force of commandos from the elite Special Boarding Unit, and P-3 Orion patrol aircraft in the Gulf of Aden. On 19 June 2009, the Japanese Diet finally passed an anti-piracy bill, which allows their force to protect non Japanese vessels. In May 2010, Japan announced it intended to build a permanent naval base in Djibouti to provide security for Japanese ships against Somali pirates.

Construction of the JSDF Counter-Piracy Facility in Djibouti commenced in July 2010, completed in June 2011 and opened on 1 July 2011. Initially, the base was to house approximately 170 JSDF personnel and include administrative, housing, medical, kitchen/dining, and recreational facilities as well as an aircraft maintenance hangar and parking apron. The base now houses approximately 200 personnel and two P-3C aircraft.

=== JSDF Overseas Dispatches ===
Since 1991, the Japan Self-Defense Forces have conducted international activities to provide support for peacekeeping missions and disaster relief efforts as well as to help prevent conflict and terrorism.

== Uniforms, ranks, and insignia ==
The arm of service to which members of the ground force are attached is indicated by branch insignia and piping of distinctive colors: for infantry, red; artillery, yellow; armor, orange; engineers, violet; ordnance, light green; medical, green; army aviation, light blue; signals, blue; quartermaster, brown; transportation, dark violet; airborne, white; and others, dark blue. The JGSDF cap badge insignia consists of a sakura cherry blossom with two ivy branches underneath, and a single chevron centered on the bottom between the bases of the branches; the JMSDF cap badge insignia consists of a fouled anchor underneath a cherry blossom bordered on the sides and bottom by ivy vines; and the JASDF cap badge insignia features a heraldic eagle over a star and crescent, which is bordered underneath with stylized wings. (For more, see Defensive meritorious badge)

There are nine officer ranks in the active JSDF, along with a warrant officer rank, five NCO ranks, and three enlisted ranks. The highest NCO rank, first sergeant (senior chief petty officer in the JMSDF and senior master sergeant in the JASDF), was established in 1980 to provide more promotion opportunities and shorter terms of service as sergeant first class, chief petty officer, or master sergeant. Under the earlier system, the average NCO was promoted only twice in approximately thirty years of service and remained at the top rank for almost ten years.

== Recruitment and conditions of service ==
As of 2016, the total strength of the JSDF was 247,154. In addition, the JSDF maintained a total of 47,900 reservists attached to the three services. The Japanese Constitution abolished conscription on 3 May 1947. Enlistment in the JSDF is voluntary at 18 years of age. As of 2017, roughly 37% of Japan's active military personnel were over 40 years old.

When Japan's active and reserve components are combined, the country maintains a lower ratio of military personnel to its population than any member nation of the North Atlantic Treaty Organization (NATO). Of the major Asian nations, only India, Indonesia, Malaysia and Thailand keep a lower ratio of personnel in arms. Since India and Indonesia have much larger populations, they have greater numbers of personnel, yet a lower ratio of personnel in arms.

JSDF uniformed personnel are recruited as self-defense official cadet for a fixed term. Ground forces recruits normally enlist for two years; those seeking training in technical specialties enlist for three. Naval and air recruits normally enlist for three years. Officer candidates, students in the National Defense Academy and National Defense Medical College, and candidate enlist students in technical schools are enrolled for an indefinite period. The National Defense Academy and enlisted technical schools usually require an enrollment of four years, and the National Defense Medical College require six years.

When the JSDF was originally formed, women were recruited exclusively for the nursing services. Opportunities were expanded somewhat when women were permitted to join the JGSDF communication service in 1967 and the JMSDF and JASDF communication services in 1974. By 1991, more than 6,000 women were in the JSDF, about 80% of service areas, except those requiring direct exposure to combat, were open to them. The National Defense Medical College graduated its first class with women in March 1991, and the National Defense Academy began admitting women in FY 1992. In total, 20% of JSDF recruits are women. In one of its recent attempts to increase recruitment rates, its marketing campaigns have focused more on women. The JSDF's recruitment levels often fail to meet national targets. In 2018, the number of new recruits to the Japan Maritime Self-Defense Force was below 60% of its annual goal.

JSDF personnel benefits are not comparable to such benefits for active-duty military personnel in other major industrialized nations. Health care is provided at the JSDF Central Hospital, fourteen regional hospitals, and 165 clinics in military facilities and on board ship, but the health care only covers physical examinations and the treatment of illness and injury suffered on duty. There are no commissary or exchange privileges. Housing is often substandard, and military appropriations for facilities maintenance often focus on appeasing civilian communities near bases rather than on improving on-base facilities.

In 2010, the Sapporo District Court fined the state after a female JASDF member was sexually assaulted by a colleague then forced to retire, while the perpetrator was suspended for 60 days.

In 2024, the Japanese Defense Ministry announced that it would allow JSDF recruits to start sporting longer hairstyles beginning in April as part of efforts to increase membership for as long as it did not impede the wearing of headgear and could be tied up without falling into the shoulders.

== Role in Japanese society ==
Due to the strong anti-militarism and pacifism pervading Japan in the aftermath of World War II, the JSDF was the subject of public ridicule and disdain in its early years. The forces were called "tax thieves" and personnel who wore their uniforms in public faced verbal abuse as well as harassment such as being pelted with stones.

Appreciation of the JSDF continued to grow in the 1980s, with over half of the respondents in a 1988 survey voicing an interest in the JSDF and over 76% indicating that they were favourably impressed. Although the majority (63.5%) of respondents were aware that the primary purpose of the JSDF was maintenance of national security, an even greater number (77%) saw disaster relief as the most useful JSDF function. The JSDF therefore continued to devote much of its time and resources to disaster relief and other civic action. Between 1984 and 1988, at the request of prefectural governors, the JSDF assisted in approximately 3,100 disaster relief operations, involving about 138,000 personnel, 16,000 vehicles, 5,300 aircraft, and 120 ships and small craft. The disaster relief operations increased its favorability with the public. In addition, the JSDF participated in earthquake disaster prevention operations and disposed of a large quantity of World War II explosive ordnance, especially in Okinawa Prefecture. The forces also participated in public works projects, cooperated in managing athletic events, took part in annual Antarctic expeditions, and conducted aerial surveys to report on ice conditions for fishermen and on geographic formations for construction projects. Especially sensitive to maintaining harmonious relations with communities close to defense bases, the JSDF built new roads, irrigation networks, and schools in those areas. Soundproofing was installed in homes and public buildings near airfields.

In terms of public opinion regarding the JSDF in relation to its role in Japan's national security, an analysis of surveys on public opinion towards the JSDF found broad support for the JSDF as part of a "reassurance strategy," and noted specifically that support for the JSDF is related to individuals' exposure to war memories through family members and war memorials. The analysis finds that "exposures to war memories through various venues enhance Japanese citizens' support for the SDF's reassurance strategy in which the SDF issues peaceful signals toward other countries in the region."

However, it has changed since the 2000s. The SDF is also short of people. "There have been improvements in terms of hard-ware, but I'm more worried about the soft-ware, the fighting posture," says Katsutoshi Kawano. Though many respect the SDF, relatively few people are ready to join. In global surveys Japan ranks last in terms of the share of the population willing to fight for their country, with just 9% answering in the affirmative. Last year the SDF missed its recruiting target by half. Nor does widespread respect for the SDF or concern about aggressive neighbours translate into eagerness to completely abandon Japan's post-war peace-loving identity. When JS Ise, a light aircraft-carrier, moored off Sendai in 2024, civilian sentiment included "...the SDF is a safety net—it's the last resort,".

=== Memorial zone ===
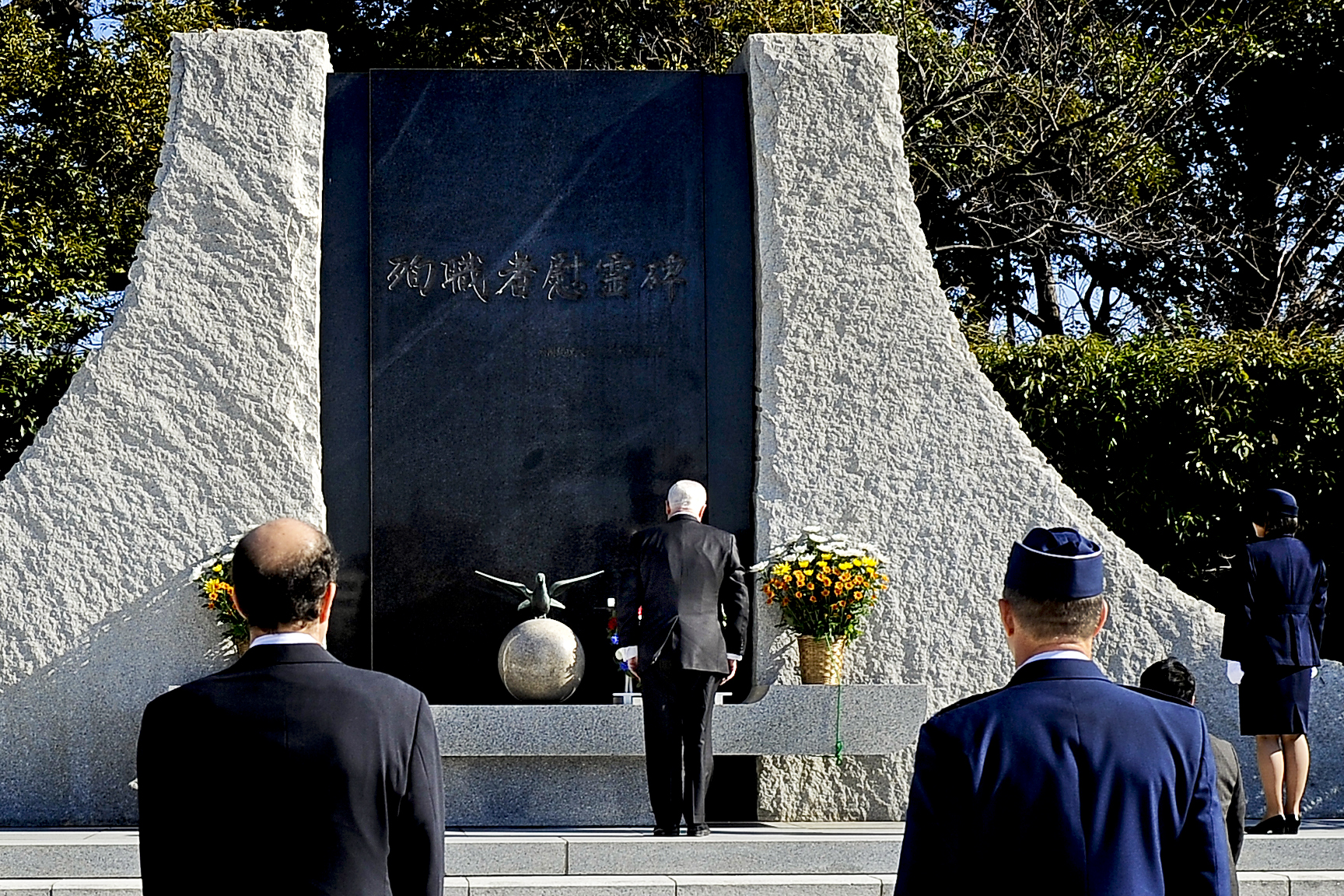
Cenotaph in the Memorial Zone

Since the establishment of the National Police Reserve in 1950, 1,964 National Police Reserve, National Security Forces, and Self-Defense Force personnel have died in the line of duty through 2021. The 6,000 square meters Memorial Zone is on the east-side of the Ministry of Defense headquarters in Ichigaya. It features the martyr to duty cenotaph of the Self Defense Forces. 16 memorial monuments scattered in the Ichigaya area were collected and transferred to this place. The cenotaph for the martyrs of the Self-Defense Forces faces the direction of the Yasukuni Shrine, but it is unaffiliated. The memorial ceremony for those who died in the service of the Self-Defense Forces is usually held there.

== Japan Self-Defense Forces Day ==
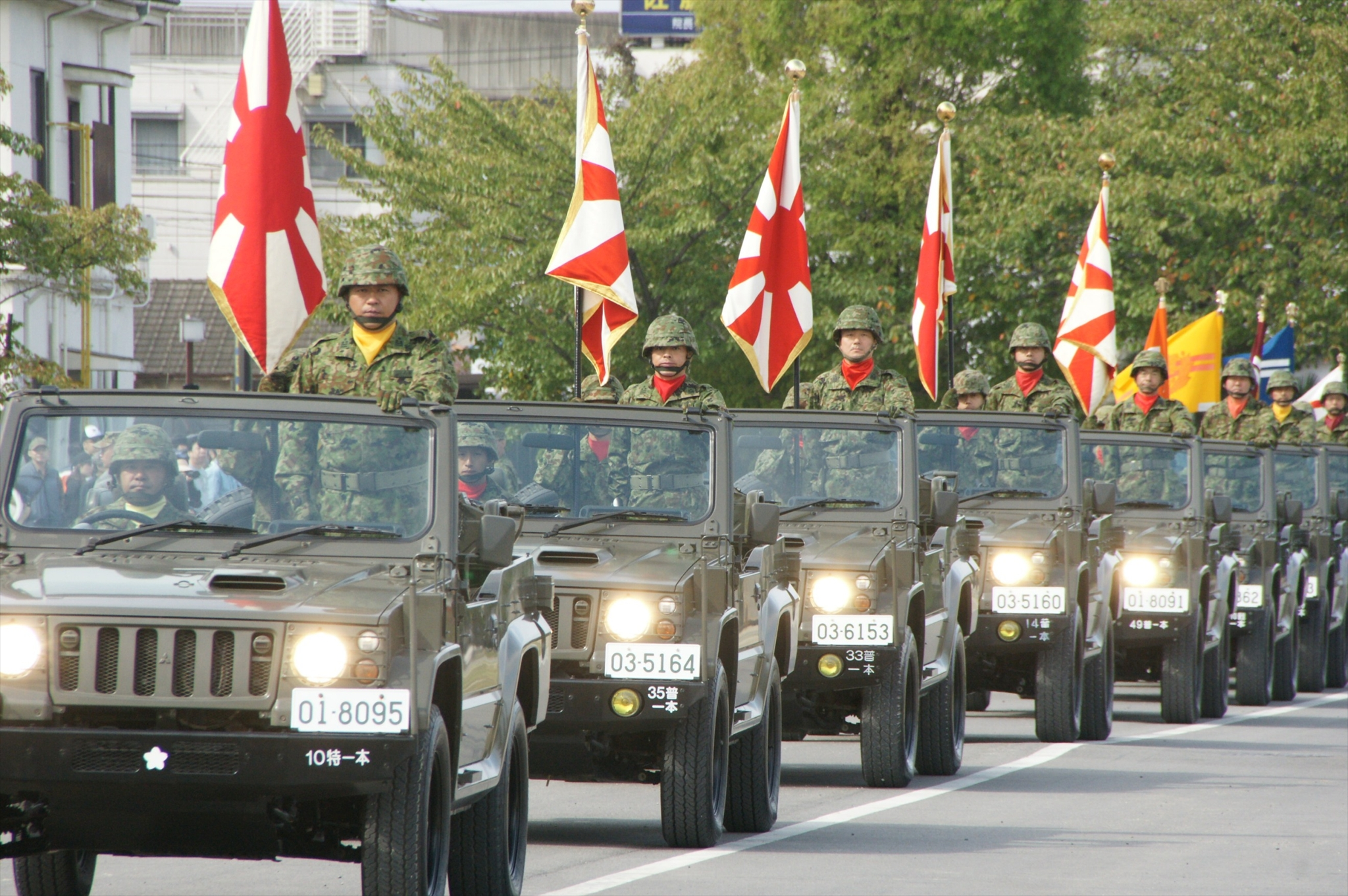
Head of the 10th Division and other regiments on JSDF Day in 2011

The Japan Self-Defense Forces Day (自衛隊記念日, Jieitai Kinen'bi) celebrates the foundation of the Japan Self-Defense Forces. It is celebrated every year in Japan since 1966. The JGSDF, JMSDF and JASDF hold annual reviews in rotation. There is also a three-day music event called the JSDF Marching Festival. The date varies per year.

=== Fleet reviews ===
The 28th Fleet Review was held in Sagami Bay on 18 October 2015. 42 vessels participated in the celebratory cruise including the JS Izumo and six vessels from Australia, France, India, the Republic of Korea, and the United States. 37 aircraft from the JASDF and the U.S. forces flew over.

During the 2018 Self-Defense Forces Day, Prime Minister Shinzo Abe reviewed JSDF members at Camp Asaka. There were 4,000 troops, 260 tanks and other military vehicles and 40 warplanes. Abe said that they have gained public trust and it is the responsibility of politicians to revise the 1947 constitution to mention the JSDF and give them a sense of pride.

=== JSDF Marching Festival ===
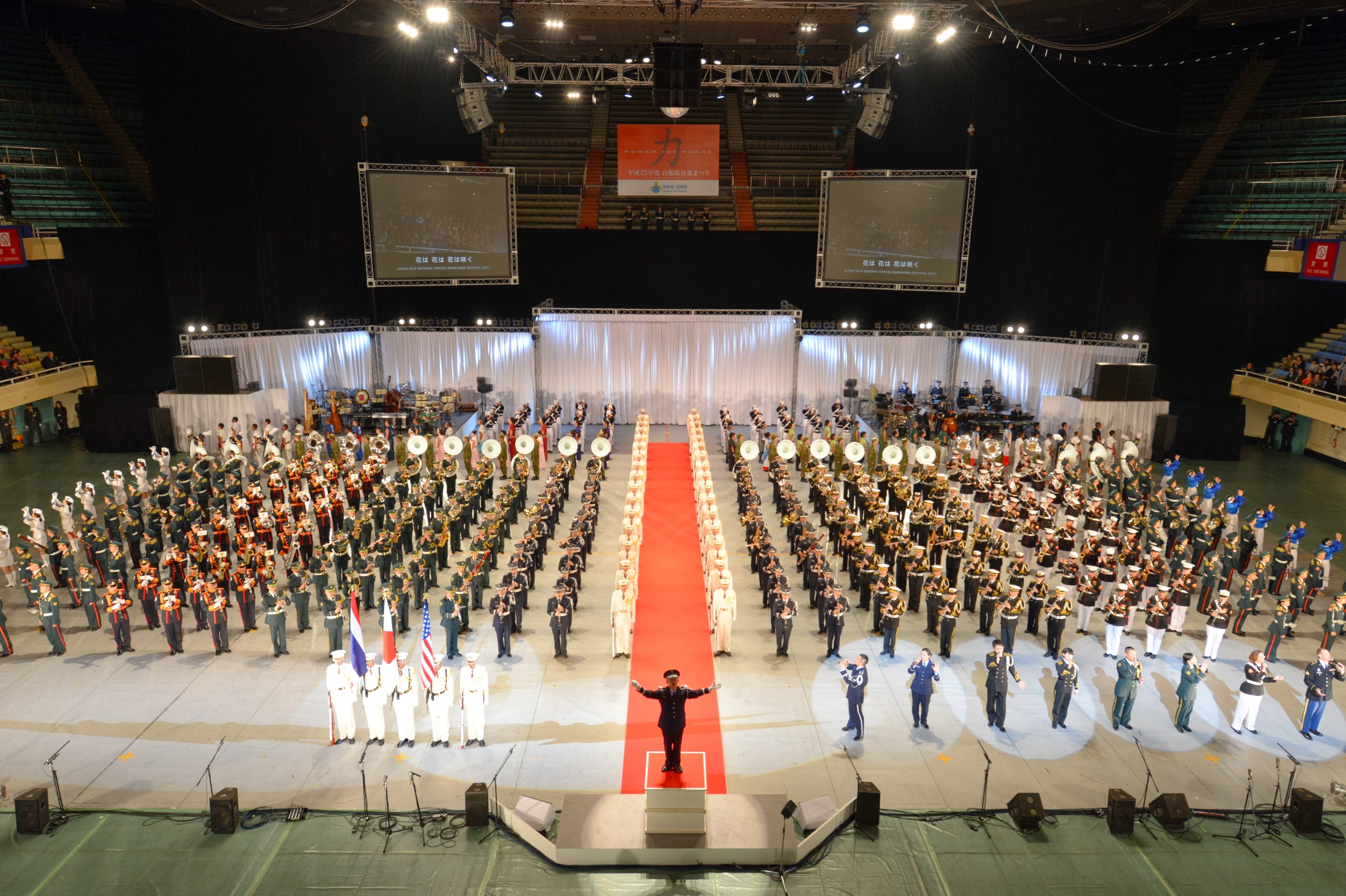
JSDF Marching Festival in Heisei, 2013

The JSDF Marching Festival (自衛隊音楽まつり, Jieitai Ongaku Matsuri) is the JSDF's largest music event held annually around November. It usually takes place in Nippon Budokan for three days. It also features guest bands from other countries. It was established in 1963. It is one of the oldest military tattoos in the Asia-Pacific region.

In 2014, the JGSDF Central Band, the JMSDF Tokyo Band, the JASDF Central Band, and the JGSDF Northern and Eastern Army Bands participated as well as special guest bands from the United States Army, Japan, the 3rd Marine Expeditionary Force, the Australian Army, and the Philippine Marine Corps. There were band performances, honor guard display by the 302nd Military Police Company, a drill by the National Defense Academy and taiko drum performance by the JSDF Drum Teams.

== Fuji Firepower Review ==
The Fuji Firepower Review (富士総合火力演習, Fuji-sōgōkaryoku-enshū) is the JGSDF's largest annual live-fire drill. It began in 1961 and is open to the public since 1966 to deepen the public's understanding of the JSDF. On 26 August 2018, it was held in front of the defense minister and 24,000 spectators at the East Fuji Maneuver Area in Gotemba near the foot of Mount Fuji. That was the first time that the Amphibious Rapid Deployment Brigade participated. The drill was based on a scenario of Japanese troops being deployed to recover far-flung islands from enemy forces. It involved about 2,400 troops, 80 tanks and armored vehicles, 60 artillery shells and 20 helicopters and fighter jets.

== JSDF museums ==
These are museums about the JSDF.

- JMSDF Kure Museum – about the JMSDF and includes the retired JMSDF Yūshio-class submarine Akishio (SS-579).
- JGSDF Public Information Center – it has a museum with real combat equipment and vehicles of the JGSDF.
- Hamamatsu Air Base – it has a museum about the JASDF with Japanese aviation, planes, technology, tokusatsu and military history.
- Maritime Self-Defense Force Sasebo Museum – it has much historical materials and equipment of the Japan Maritime Self-Defense Force.
- Kanoya Air Base Museum – it is the Japan Air Self-Defense Force's historical museum in Kanoya, Kagoshima Prefecture.

== Gallery ==
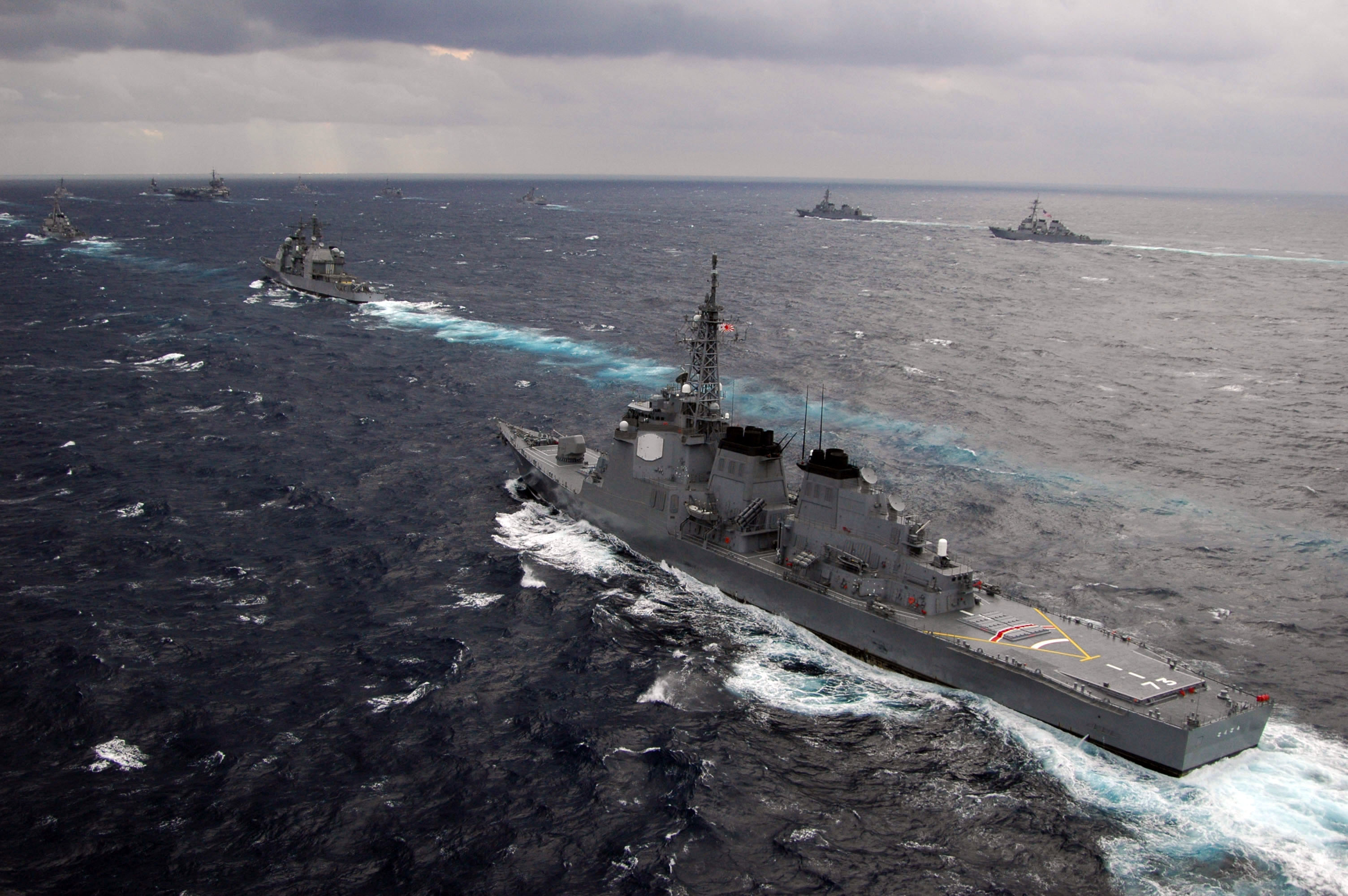
JS Kongō (DDG-173), a JMSDF Kongō-class destroyer

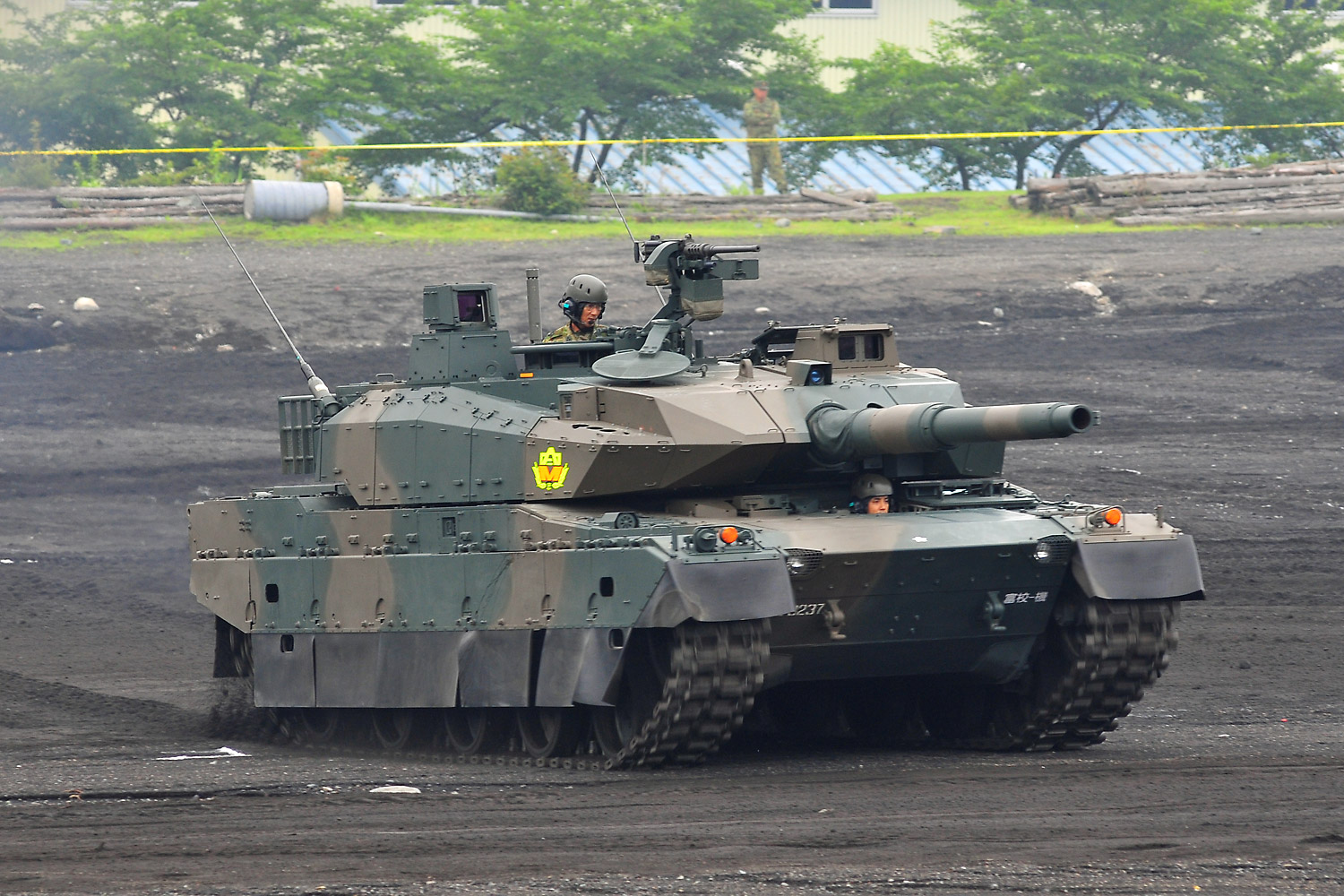
JGSDF Type 10 MBT

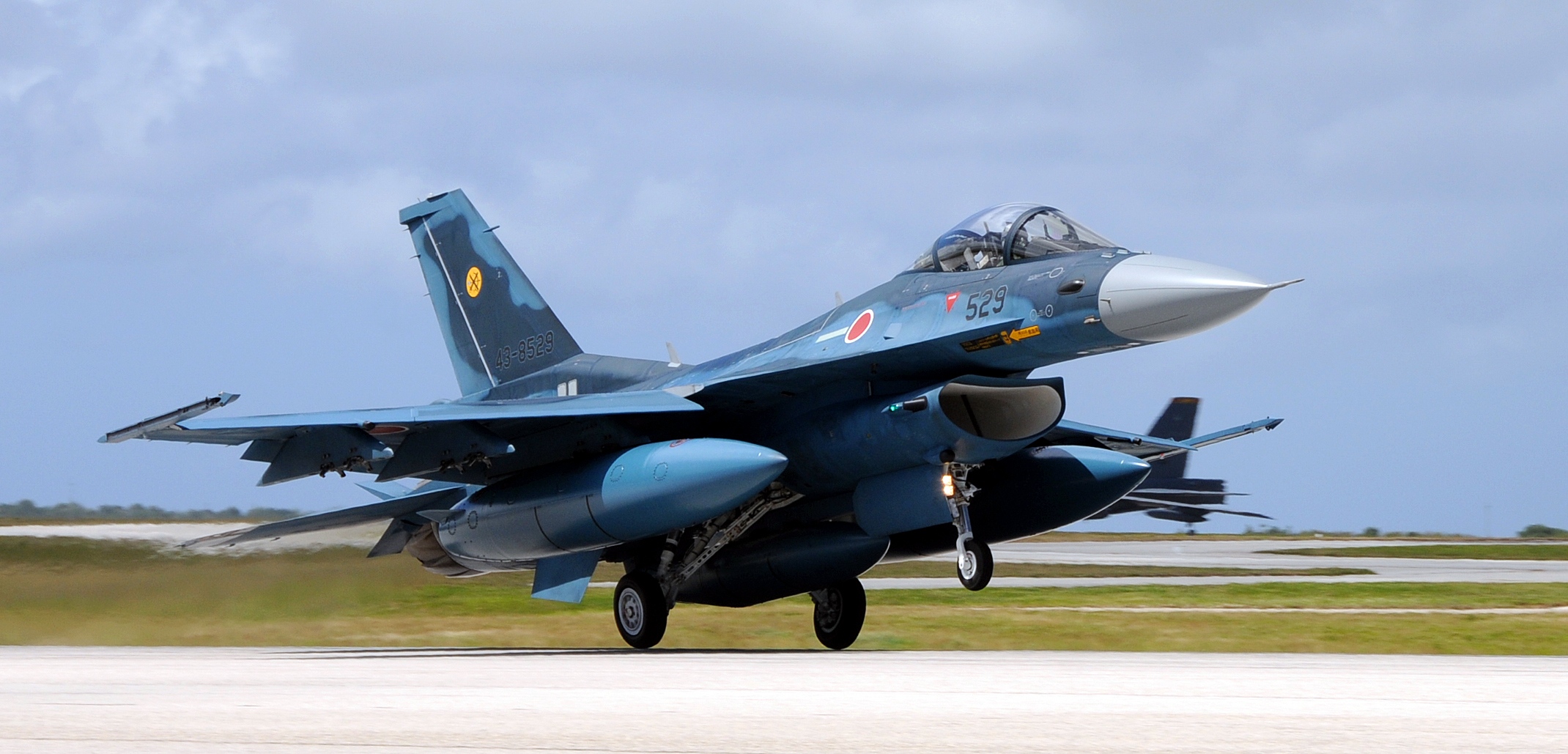
JASDF F-2

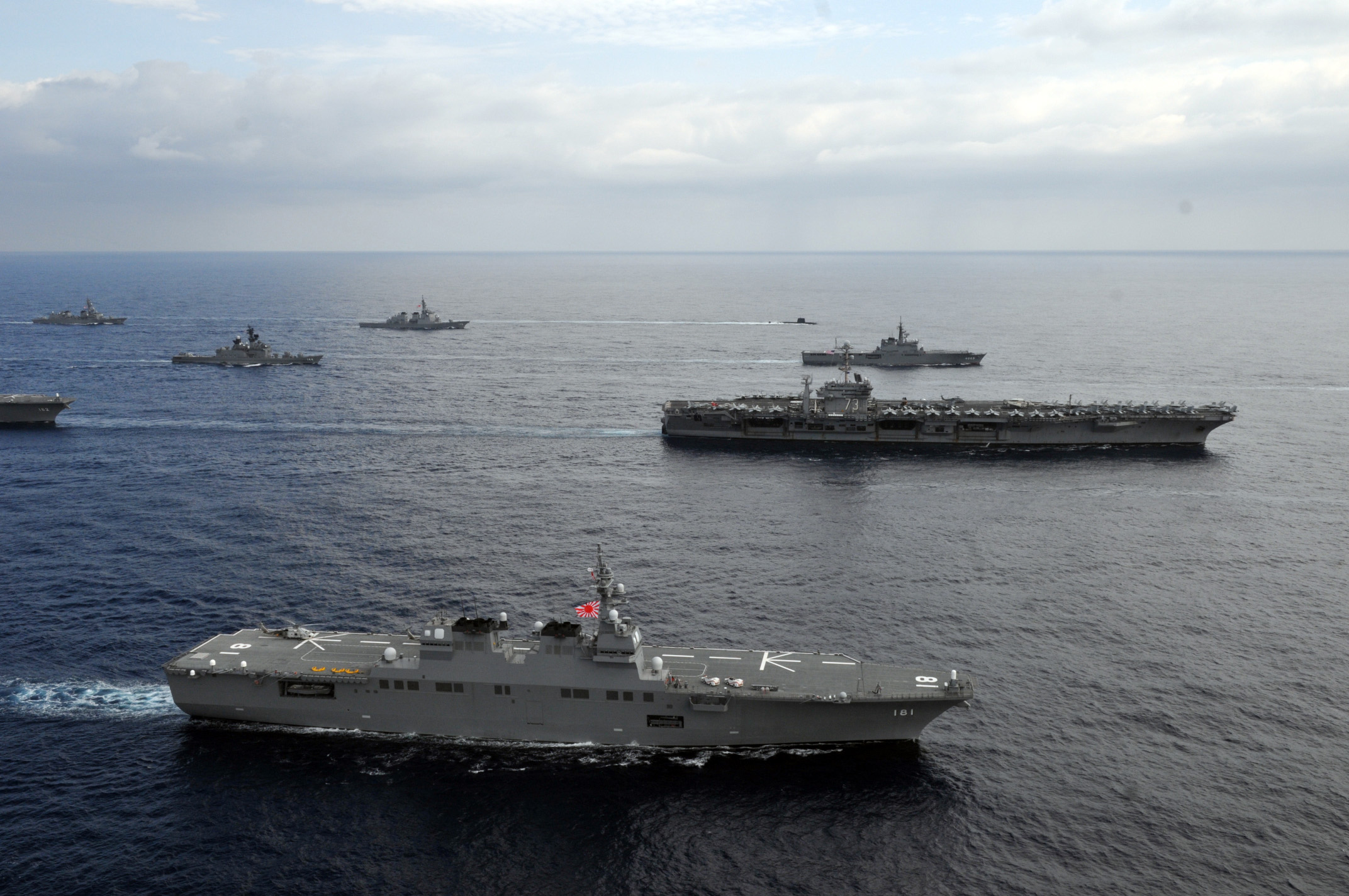
USS George Washington (CVN-73) and JS Hyūga (DDH-181)

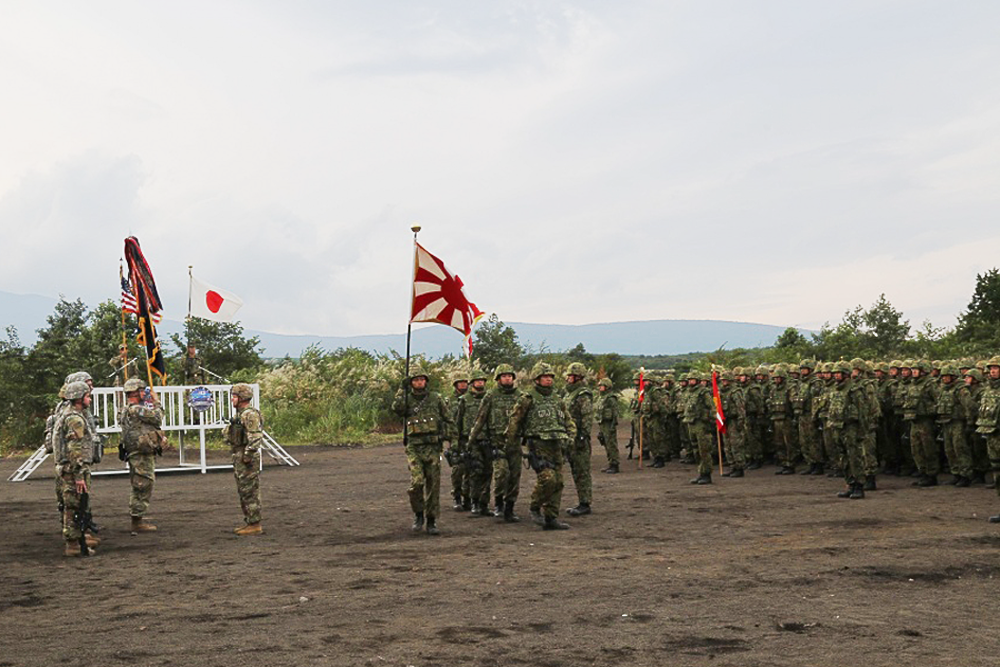
JGSDF soldiers and U.S. soldiers participate in the Orient Shield 2017 opening ceremony at Camp Shin Yokotsuka, Sept. 11, 2017.

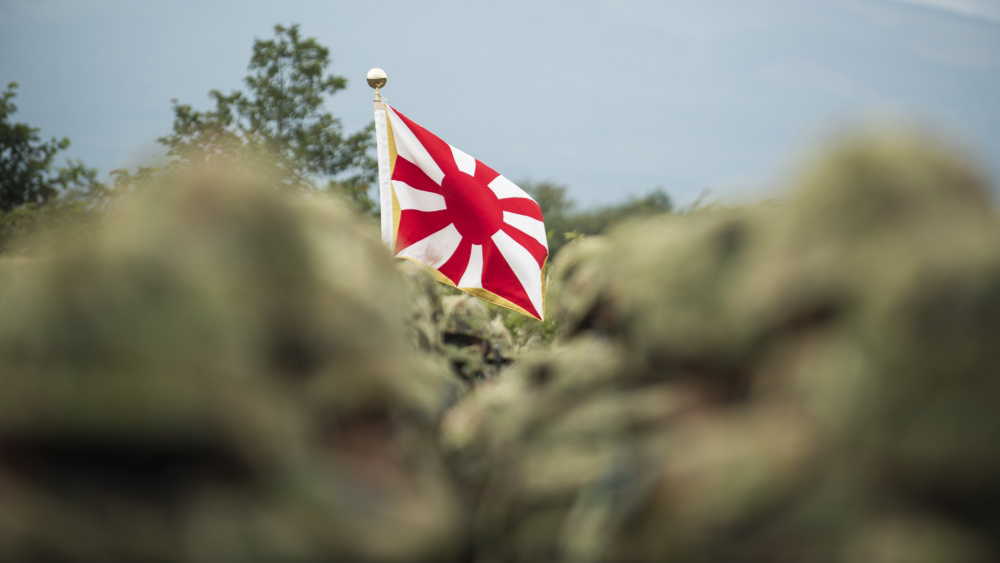
Japan Self-Defense Forces flag

== See also ==
- Mamor, official magazine of the JSDF
- United States Forces Japan
