= Defensive meritorious badge =

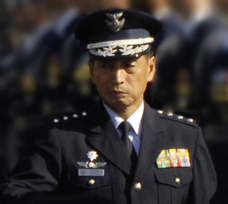
The Chief of Staff, Toshio Tamogami, of Japan Air Self-Defense Force with Special class Defense merit badge on the right chest.

Defense merit badge (Japanese: 防衛功労章) is the decorative insignia for the Members of Japan Self-Defense Forces, who were awarded a commendation certificate. The Officials who have been awarded Special class Commendation, 1st class Commendation, 2nd class Commendation, or 3rd class Commendation are given this badge as the supplementary prize.

The special class is awarded upon a recommendation from the prime minister, the first class is awarded upon a recommendation from the head of the Ministry of Defense and the second class is awarded upon a recommendation from the chiefs of staff.

Badges have been awarded to members of the armed forces that compete in the Olympics.

== Classes ==
The shape of the badge is the rays of the rising sun, vertically long. If several badges were given, the awardee must wear only the highest badge.

Appearance	English name	Japanese name	Wearer	Colour of Frame	Colour of Jewel
	Special class Defense merit badge	特別防衛功労章	The winner of Special Commendation.	Gold	Red
	1st class Defense merit badge	第一級防衛功労章	The winner of 1st Commendation.	Gold	Purple
	2nd class Defense merit badge	第二級防衛功労章	The winner of 2nd Commendation.	Gold	Green
	3rd class Defense merit badge	第三級防衛功労章	The winner of 3rd Commendation.	Silver	Blue

== See also ==
- Defensive memorial cordon
