= JDS Akishio =

Japanese submarine

Coordinates: 34°14′31″N 132°33′19″E

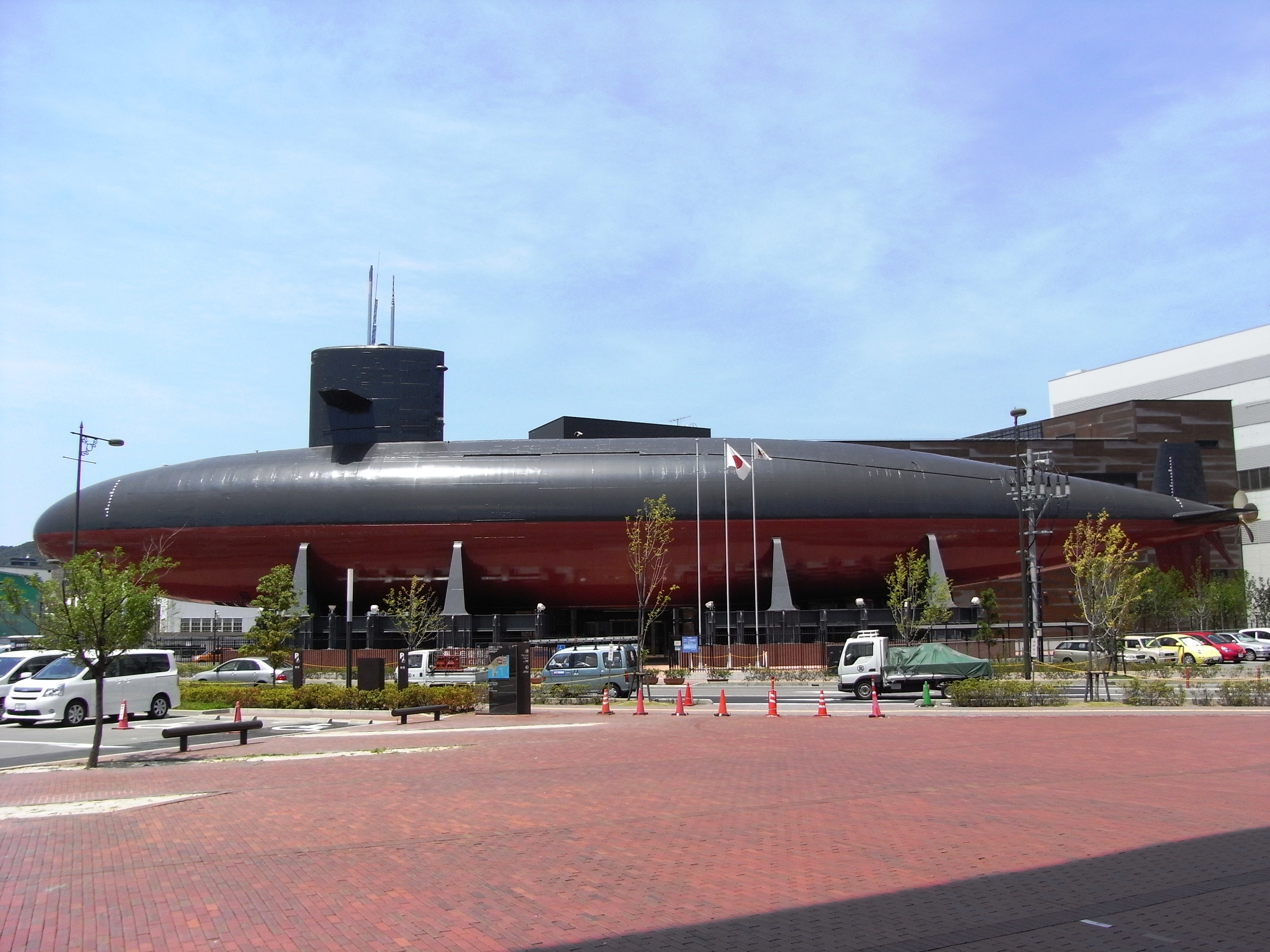
- JDS Akishio at the Kure Naval Museum.

History

Japan
- Name: Akishio; (あきしお)
- Builder: Mitsubishi Heavy Industries
- Laid down: 15 April 15, 1983
- Launched: 22 January 1985
- Commissioned: 5 March 1986
- Decommissioned: 3 March 2004
- Identification: SS-579
- Fate: On display at the JMSDF Kure Museum since 2007

General characteristics
- Class & type: Yūshio-class submarine
- Displacement: 2,250 tonnes (2,210 long tons; 2,480 short tons) (Surface), 2,450 tonnes (2,410 long tons; 2,700 short tons) (Submerged)
- Length: 76.2 m (250.0 ft)
- Beam: 9.9 m (32.5 ft)
- Draught: 10.2 m (33.5 ft)
- Propulsion: 2 × Kawasaki-MAN V8V24/30AMTL diesel engines: 3,400 bhp (2,535 kW); 1 × Electric motor: 7,200 shp (5,369 kW), 1 × Shaft, with a five-bladed propeller
- Speed: 12 knots (22 km/h; 14 mph) (surface); 20 knots (37 km/h; 23 mph) (submerged)
- Test depth: 300 m (980 ft)
- Complement: 75: 10 officer, 65 enlisted
- Sensors & processing systems: 1 × Hughes/Oki ZQQ 5 hull mounted sonar; 1 × ZQR 1 towed array
- Armament: 6 × 21 in (533 mm) torpedo tubes

Akishio (SS-579) is a retired Japanese diesel-electric Yūshio-class submarine. She was laid down in 1983, launched in 1985, commissioned in 1986, and served until 2004. She served as part of both the 1st and 5th Submarine Squadrons of the 1st Submarine Flotilla. She took part in numerous drills, including the Pacific Reach 2000 drills. She is now on display outside JMSDF Kure Museum.

== Design and construction ==
Akishio was 76.2 metres (250 ft) long, had a beam 9.9 metres (32 ft) wide, had a draught of 10.2 metres (33 ft) and displaced 2,250 tonnes (2,210 long tons; 2,480 short tons) while surfaced, and 2,450 tonnes (2,410 long tons; 2,700 short tons) when submerged. She had a teardrop hull, and was powered by two Kawasaki-MAN V8V24/30AMTL diesel engines, which produced 3,400 brake horsepower (2,500 kW), a Fuji electric motor, which produced 7,200 shaft horsepower (5,400 kW), and was propelled by one shaft, with a five-bladed propeller. She used her diesel engines while surfaced, and her electric motor when submerged. She had a top speed of 12 knots (22 km/h; 14 mph) while surfaced, and 20 knots (37 km/h; 23 mph) while submerged. She was armed with six 21-inch (533 mm) torpedo tubes, and had a complement of 75: 10 officers and 65 enlisted men. She had a test depth of 300 metres (980 ft). She used a Hughes/Oki ZQQ 5 hull mounted sonar, and a ZQR 1 towed array sonar.

== Service history ==
Akishio was laid down in Kobe by Mitsubishi Heavy Industries on 15 April 1983, launched on 22 January 1985, and commissioned on 5 March 1986. Upon being commissioned, on 5 March 1986, Akishio was immediately assigned to the 1st Submarine Squadron of the 1st Submarine Flotilla of the Japan Maritime Self-Defense Force. On 8 June 1990, she was reassigned to the 5th Submarine Squadron, which was also part of the 1st Submarine Flotilla. Her crew was trained by American submariners, from September to October, in 1991.

Akishio took part in the Pacific Reach 2000 drills, which took place from 2 to 14 October 2000, off of Singapore. The navies of the United States, Japan, Singapore, and South Korea took part. Because of the Kursk submarine disaster which had happened earlier that year, the Pacific Reach 2000 drills involved submarine rescue exercises, which Akishio performed in. This was the first time Japanese ships had taken part in a multilateral submarine rescue drill, although they had taken part in similar exercises bilaterally, with the US Navy. Japan's constitution places limits on their ability to perform collective-defence drills. Because of this, Japan joined the drills from a humanitarian standpoint, rather than a military one.

She was decommissioned on 3 March 2004. After being decommissioned, Akishio was moved from the water, and placed on display outside the Kure Maritime Museum on 5 April 2007. After being placed there, she became known as "Tetu-no-Kujira Kan", or "Iron Whale Museum". The museum has been criticized by many as being too militaristic. One of Japan's national newspapers, Asahi Shimbun, said that the museum focused too much upon military ships and weapons.
