= JMSDF Kure Museum =

Japan Maritime Self-Defense Force Kure Museum
- 海上自衛隊呉史料館
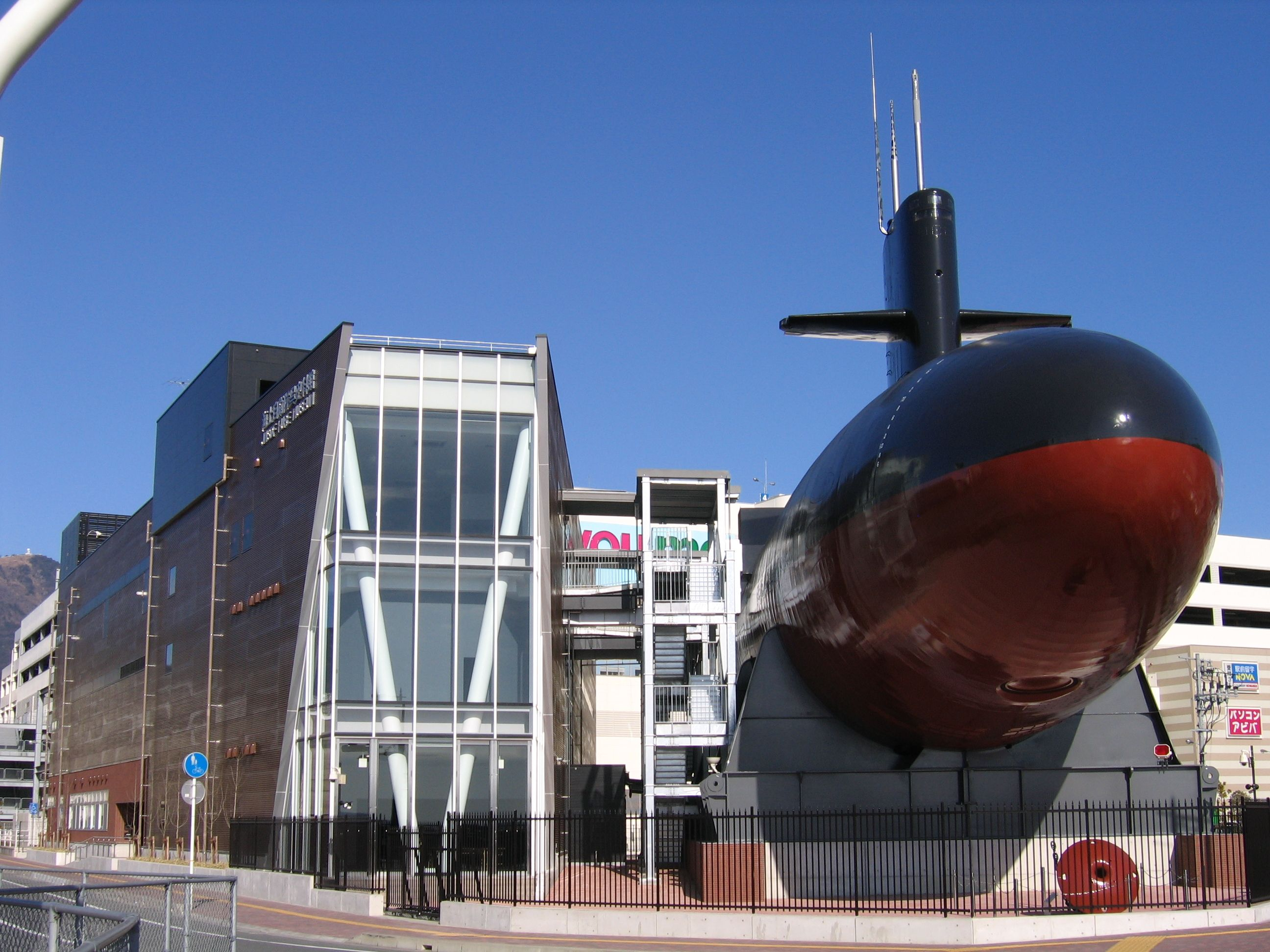
- Front exterior

- Location within Japan Location within Hiroshima Prefecture
- Established: 5 April 2007
- Location: 5-2 Takaramachi, Kure City, Hiroshima Prefecture, Japan
- Coordinates: 34°14′32″N 132°33′19.4″E
- Type: Museum#TypesMilitary museum
- Founder: Japan Maritime Self-Defense Force
- Owner: Japan Maritime Self-Defense Force
- Website: https://www.jmsdf-kure-museum.go.jp/en/

The Japan Maritime Self Defence Force Kure Museum (海上自衛隊呉史料館 (Kaijō Jieitai Kure Shiryōkan)) is a Japanese military museum located in Kure, Hiroshima. It is also known as the "Iron Whale Museum" (鉄のくじら館 (Tetsu no Kujira Kan)) after its main exhibit, JMSDF's diesel-electric submarine Akishio (decommissioned in 2004).

The museum is to hold exhibits related to minesweeping and submarine operations. The JMSDF also has museums related to aircraft at Kanoya, Kagoshima and related to surface vessels at Sasebo, Nagasaki. It displays a number of torpedoes.

It is located next to the Yamato Museum.

== Gallery ==
Akishio photographs

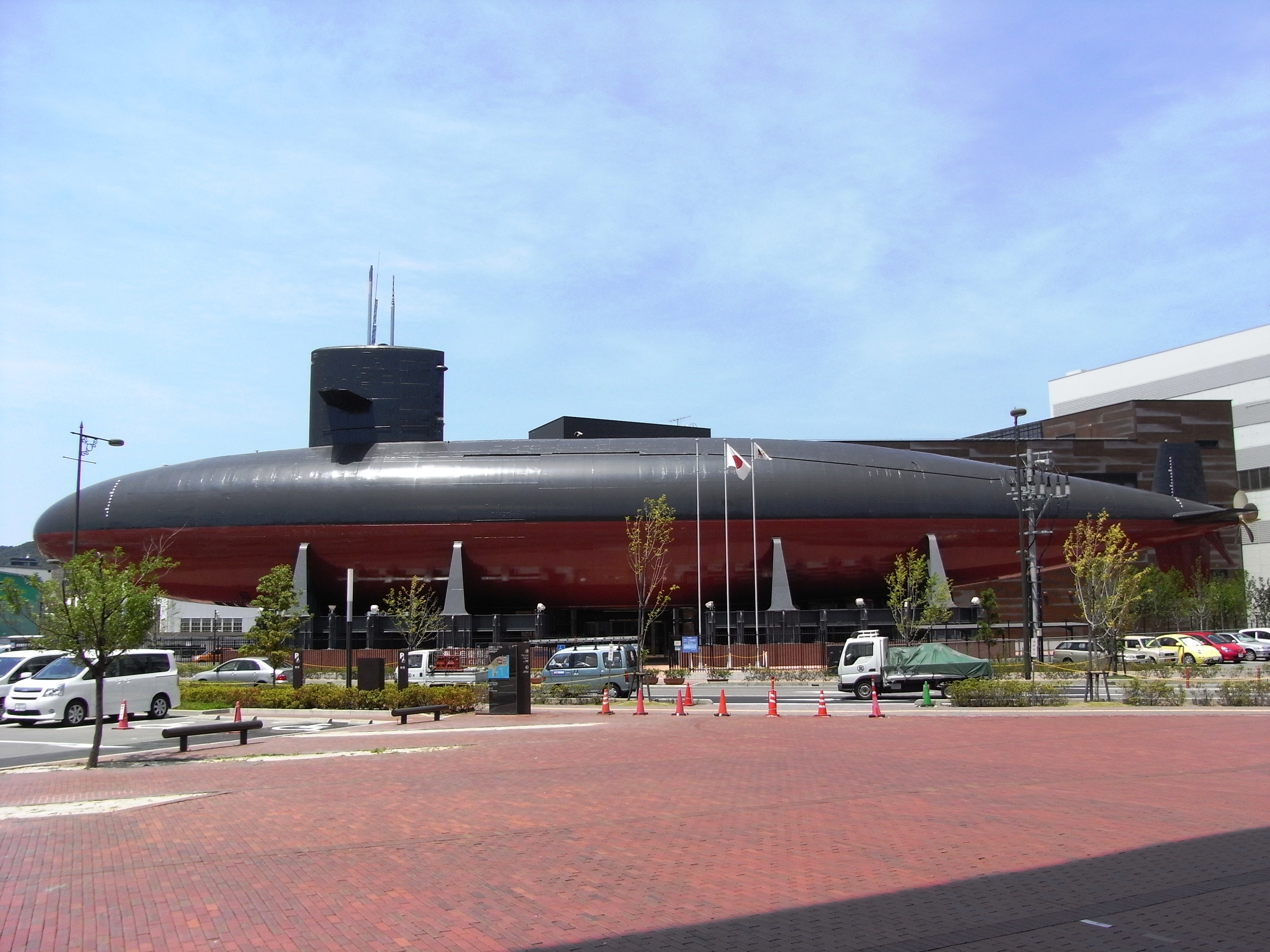
Side exterior

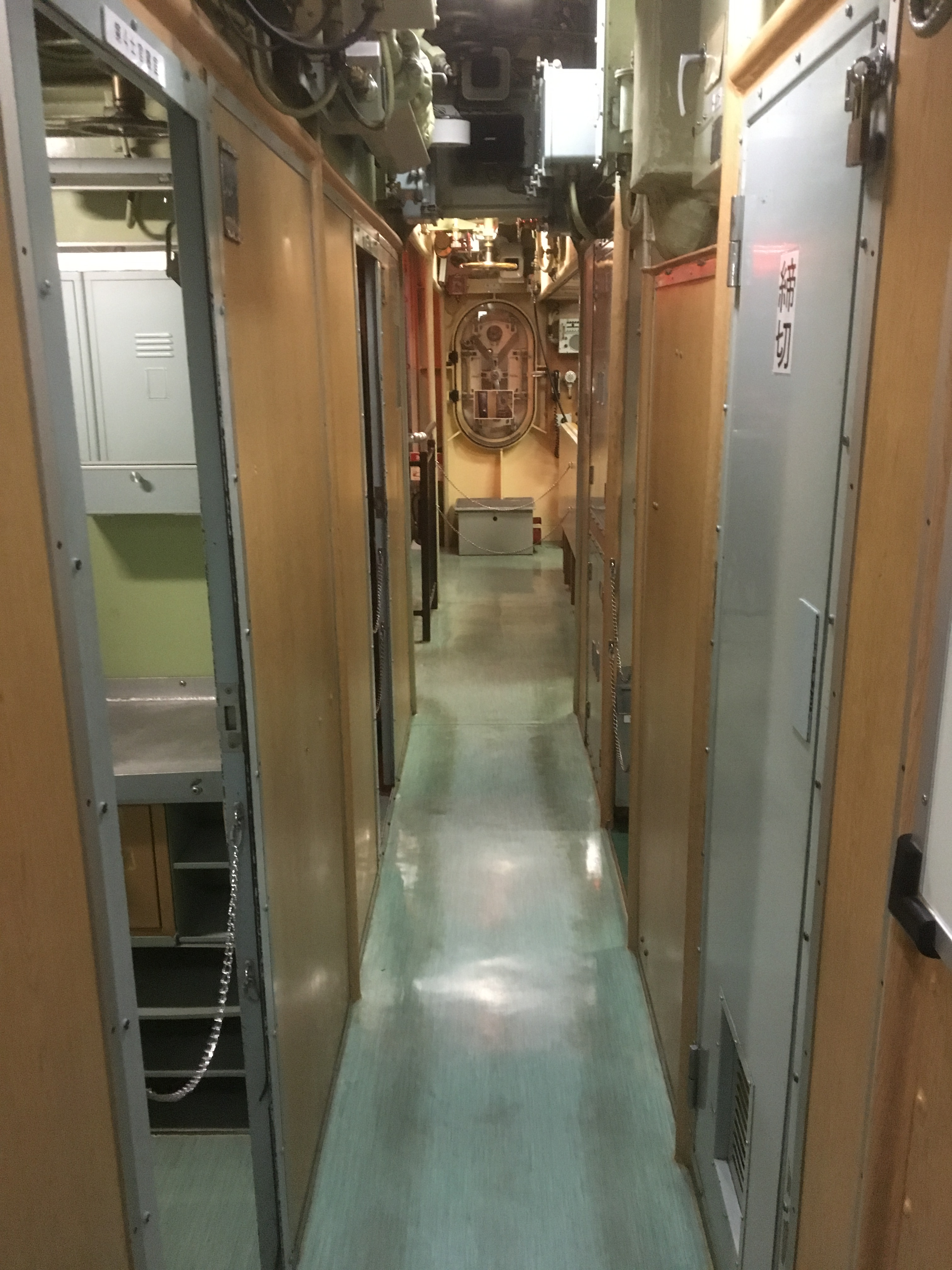
Passage-way

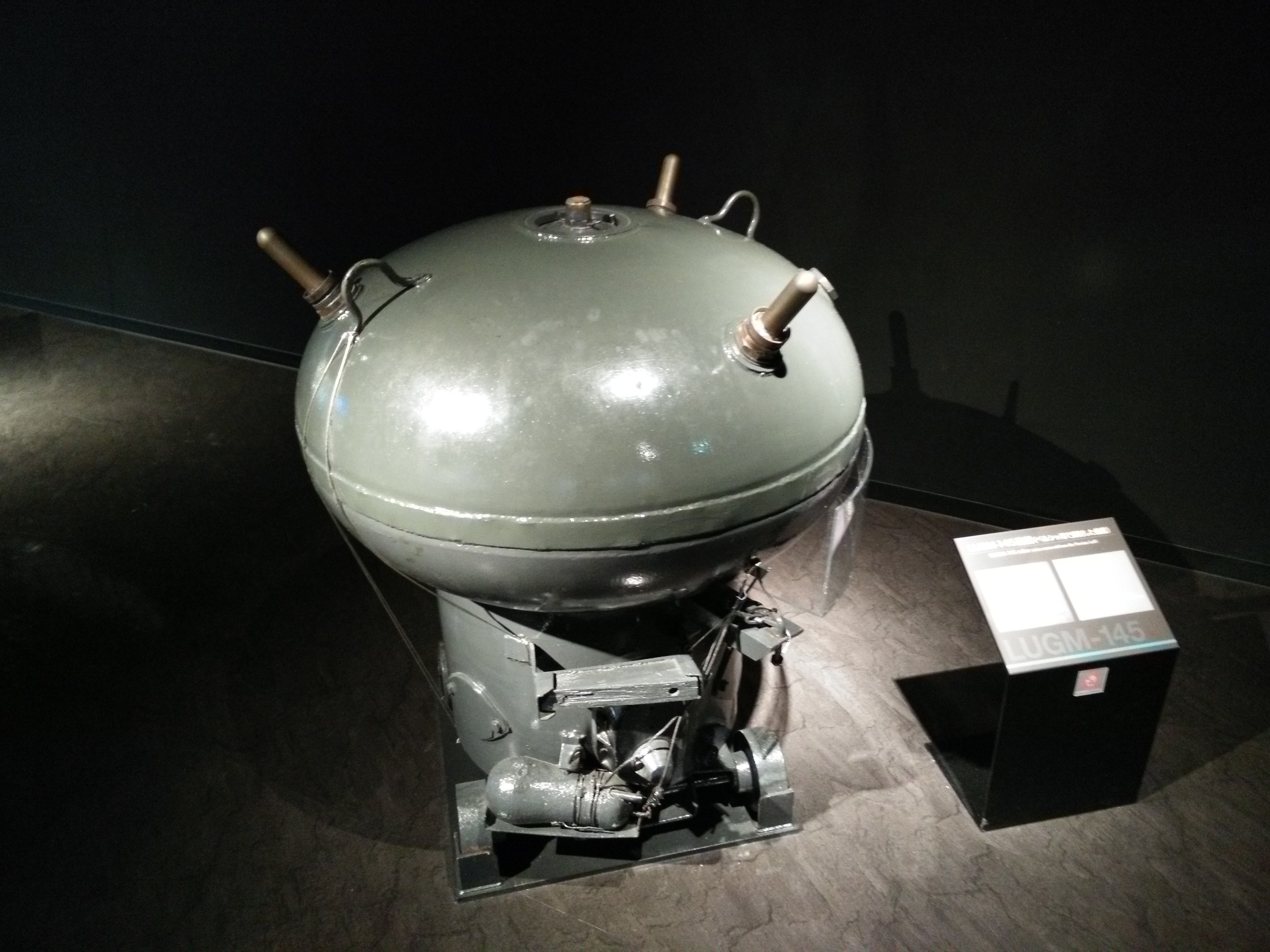
A sea mine

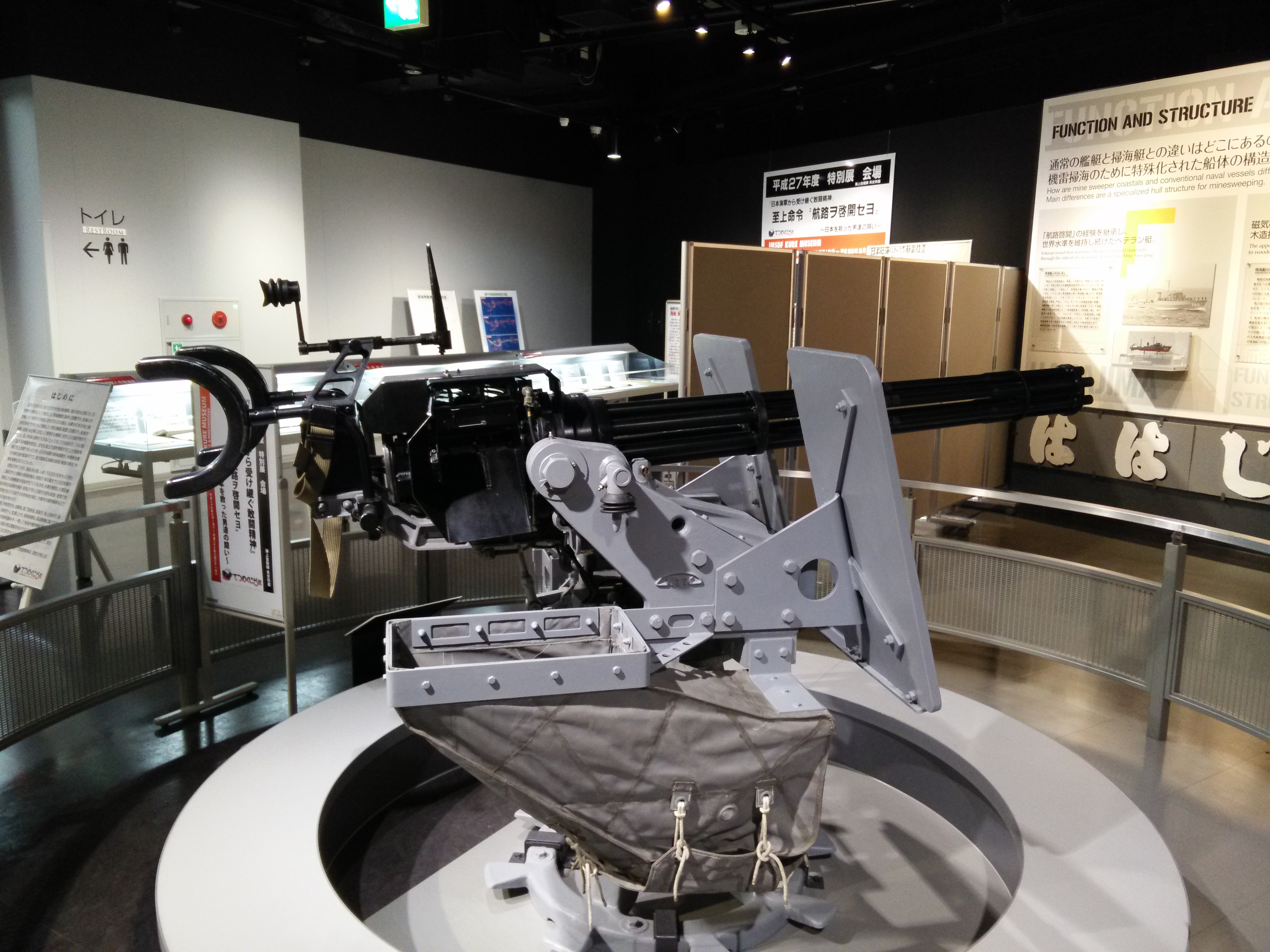
20 mm Gatling gun

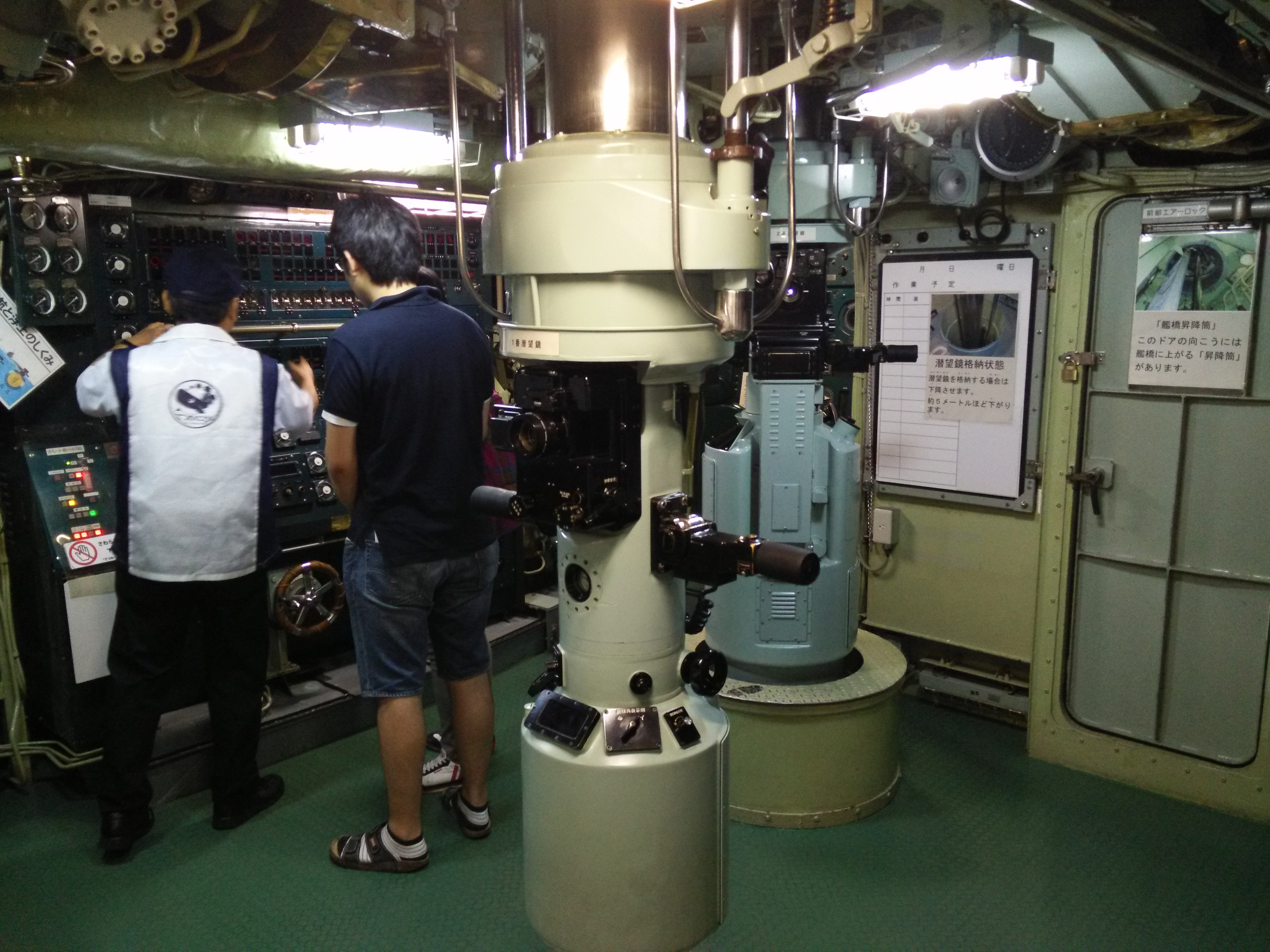
Control room
