= Daxu =

Daxu may refer to these towns in China:

- Daxu, Anhui, in Hefei, Anhui
- Daxu, Guigang, Guangxi
- Daxu, Lingchuan County, Guangxi
- Daxu, Hunan, in Jianghua County, Hunan
- Daxu, Jiangsu, in Xuzhou, Jiangsu
- Daxu, Zhejiang, in Xiangshan County, Zhejiang

== See also ==
- Daxue (disambiguation)
