= Facility (Japan) =

A facility (施設等機関, Shisetsu-tō Kikan) is a collective term for Japanese organizations such as test and research laboratories, inspection and certification institutes, educational and training facilities, medical and rehabilitation facilities, reformatory and internment facilities, and work facilities that are established under the Cabinet Office or other governmental organizations (ministries, commissions and agencies) set forth in Article 3, paragraph 2 of the National Government Organization Act. It is distinguished from an extraordinary organ. The classification was created on 1 July 1985 when an amendment to the National Government Organization Act was put into effect.

== List of the facilities ==
- Cabinet Office
  - Economic and Social Research Institute
  - State Guest Houses (Akasaka Palace / Kyoto State Guest House)
- Imperial Household Agency
  - Office of the Shōsōin Treasure House
  - Imperial Stock Farms
- Ministry of Internal Affairs and Communications
  - Local Autonomy College
  - Institute for Information and Communications Policy
  - Statistical Research and Training Institute
- Fire and Disaster Management Agency
  - Fire and Disaster Management College
- Ministry of Justice
  - Prisons (59)
  - Juvenile Prisons (8)
  - Detention Houses (7)
  - Juvenile Training Schools (52)
  - Juvenile Classification Homes (52)
  - Women's Guidance Home (1)
  - Immigration Detention Centers (3)
  - Research and Training Institute of the Ministry of Justice
  - Training Institute for Correctional Personnel
- Public Security Intelligence Agency
  - Training Institute
- Ministry of Foreign Affairs
  - Foreign Service Training Institute
- Ministry of Finance
  - Policy Research Institute
  - Accounting Center
  - Central Customs Laboratory
  - Customs Training Institute
- National Tax Agency
  - National Tax College
- Ministry of Education, Culture, Sports, Science and Technology
  - National Institute for Educational Policy Research
  - National Institute of Science and Technology Policy
- Ministry of Health, Labour and Welfare
  - Quarantine Stations (13)
  - National Hansen's Disease Sanatoriums (13)
  - National Institute of Health Sciences
  - National Institute of Public Health
  - National Institute of Population and Social Security Research
  - National Institute of Infectious Diseases
  - National Homes for Juvenile Training and Education (2)
  - National Rehabilitation Center for Persons with Disabilities
- Ministry of Agriculture, Forestry and Fisheries
  - Plant Protection Station (4)
  - Naha Plant Protection Station
  - Animal Quarantine Service
  - National Veterinary Assay Laboratory
  - Training Institute of Agricultural Administration
  - Policy Research Institute
- Forestry Agency
  - Forest Training Institute
- Ministry of Economy, Trade and Industry
  - Training Institute of Economy, Trade and Industry
- Ministry of Land, Infrastructure, Transport and Tourism
  - Policy Research Institute for Land Infrastructure and Transport
  - National Institute for Land and Infrastructure Management
  - College of Land, Infrastructure and Transport
  - Aeronautical Safety College
- Japan Meteorological Agency
  - Meteorological Research Institute
  - Meteorological Satellite Center
  - Aerological Observatory
  - Magnetic Observatory
  - Meteorological College
- Japan Coast Guard
  - Japan Coast Guard Academy
  - Japan Coast Guard School
- Ministry of the Environment
  - National Environmental Research and Training Institute
- Ministry of Defense
  - National Defense Academy
  - National Defense Medical College
  - National Institute for Defense Studies
