= Special organization (Japan) =

A special organization (特別の機関, Tokubetsu no kikan) is a Japanese government organization established under the Cabinet Office, ministries or their external organs (commission and agencies) when particularly necessary. It is distinguished from a facility. The classification was created when the amendments to the National Government Organization Act were promulgated on July 1, 1984. The amendments, in particular, made it clear that the National Police Agency is an extraordinary organ attached to the National Public Safety Commission, which is an external organ of the Cabinet Office.

== Examples ==
- Cabinet Office
  - Office for the Promotion of Overcoming Population Decline and Vitalizing Local Economy in Japan
  - Secretariat of Intellectual Property Strategy Headquarters
  - Office of National Space Policy
  - Northern Territories Affairs Administration
  - Child and Child-rearing Administration
  - National Ocean Policy Secretariat
  - Financial Crisis Response Council
  - Council for the Promotion of Private Finance Initiatives
  - Headquarters for Promotion of Development and Support for Children and Young People
  - Council on Measures to Cope with Society with Declining Birthrate
  - Aging Society Policy Council
  - Central Traffic Safety Policy Council
  - Council for the Promotion of Policies for Crime Victims
  - Council for Combating Childhood Poverty
  - Consumer Policy Council
  - International Peace Cooperation Headquarters
  - Science Council of Japan
  - Center for Personnel Interchanges between the Government and Private Entities
  - Atomic Energy Location Council
- National Public Safety Commission
  - National Police Agency
- Ministry of Internal Affairs and Communications
  - Central Election Management Council
  - National Committee for the Management of Political Fund
- Ministry of Justice
  - Public Prosecutors Office (Supreme Public Prosecutors Office, High Public Prosecutors Offices, District Public Prosecutors Offices, Local Public Prosecutors Offices)
- Ministry of Foreign Affairs
  - Overseas Diplomatic Establishments (Embassies, Consulates, Permanent Missions)
- National Tax Agency
  - National Tax Tribunal
- Ministry of Education, Culture, Sports, Science and Technology
  - Japan Academy
  - Headquarters for Earthquake Research Promotion
  - Japanese National Commission for UNESCO
- Agency for Cultural Affairs
  - Japan Art Academy
- Ministry of Health, Labour and Welfare
  - Council for Policy of Suicide Prevention
  - Central Council for Countermeasures for the Unemployed Who Left the U.S. Forces in Japan
- Ministry of Agriculture, Forestry and Fisheries
  - Agriculture, Forestry and Fisheries Research Council
  - Council for the Promotion of Dietary Education
- Fisheries Agency
  - Pacific Ocean Wide Sea-area Fisheries Adjustment Commission
  - Sea-of-Japan / Kyushu West Wide Sea-area Fisheries Adjustment Commission
  - Seto Inland Sea Wide Sea-area Fisheries Adjustment Commission
- Ministry of Land, Infrastructure, Transport and Tourism
  - Geospatial Information Authority of Japan
  - Ogasawara General Office
  - Bicycle Utilization Promotion Headquarters
  - Japan Marine Accident Tribunal
- Ministry of the Environment
  - Conference on Environmental Pollution Control
- Ministry of Defense
  - Defense Council
  - Staff Office
    - Joint Staff Office
    - Ground Staff Office
    - Maritime Staff Office
    - Air Staff Office
  - Units and Organizations of the Japan Self-Defense Forces
    - Japan Ground Self-Defense Force
    - Japan Maritime Self-Defense Force
    - Japan Air Self-Defense Force
    - Cooperative Units
    - Cooperative Organizations
  - Defense Intelligence Headquarters
  - Inspector General's Office of Legal Compliance
  - Foreign Military Supply Tribunal (established temporarily)
  - Conference on Promotion concerning Realignment of U.S. Forces in Japan
