= Sendai Detention House =

Detention facility in Sendai, Japan

Sendai Detention House 仙台拘置支所 (Sendai Kōchi-shisho)
- Interactive map of Sendai Detention House 仙台拘置支所 (Sendai Kōchi-shisho)
- Location: Sendai, Miyagi Prefecture, Japan; 38°14′10″N 140°53′56″E
- Status: Operational
- Opened: 1879
- Managed by: Ministry of Justice

Sendai Detention House (仙台拘置支所, Sendai Kōchi-shisho) is a correctional facility in Wakabayashi-ku, Sendai. A part of the penal system of Japan, it is operated by the Ministry of Justice.

One of Japan's seven execution chambers is in this facility.

== Notable prisoners ==
- Sachiko Eto (hanged September 27, 2012)
- Yasuo Hayashi (executed July 26, 2018)
