= 大學 =

大學 or 大学 (literally "university" in Chinese and Japanese) may refer to:

- Daehangno (Korean: 대학/大學), an area in Seoul north of the Han River within Jongno and Seodaemun districts
- Daigaku (disambiguation) (Japanese: 大学)
- Great Learning (Chinese: 大學), one of the "Four Books" in Confucianism
- University station (MTR) (Chinese: 大學), a train station in Ma Liu Shui, Hong Kong

== See also ==
- List of universities in China
  - List of higher education institutions in Hong Kong
  - List of universities in Macau
- List of universities in Japan
- List of universities in Malaysia
- List of universities in North Korea
- List of universities in Singapore
- List of universities in South Korea
- List of universities in Taiwan
- List of universities in Vietnam
- Disambiguation pages
  - 大同大学 (disambiguation)
  - 中央大學 (disambiguation)
  - 南華大學 (disambiguation)
  - 東亞大學 (disambiguation)
  - 東海大學 (disambiguation)
  - 暨南大學 (disambiguation)
  - 嶺南大學 (disambiguation)
