= Kobe Detention House =

Correctional facility

- Location within Hyōgo Prefecture Location within Japan
- Location: Kita-ku, Kobe; 34°42′20.300″N 135°7′13.001″E
- Status: Operational
- Managed by: Ministry of Justice

Kobe Detention House (神戸拘置所, Kobe Kōchisho) is a correctional facility in Kita-ku, Kobe. A part of the penal system of Japan, it is operated by the Ministry of Justice.

== Incidents ==
A man who had been detained in the same detention center since August 2005 on charges of violating the Child Prostitution and Child Pornography Law became ill on January 6, 2006, and died in the morning of the following day. At the time, the man's prison cell had been left open despite the winter, and he was determined to have died from freezing. His bereaved family filed a lawsuit seeking damages at the Kobe District Court. The court ordered the government to pay about 43.6 million yen, saying that prison officials neglected monitoring while noticing a change in his physical condition.

On June 14, 2012, 53 people in the same detention center complained of food poisoning symptoms such as diarrhea and abdominal pain, and Clostridium perfringens was detected in some of these patients. Kobe city authorities determined that the food poisoning was caused by the food prepared and served at the detention center, and took measures to suspend the use of the kitchen until eight days later.
