= Kyoto Detention House =

Detention facility in Kyoto, Japan

Kyoto Detention House 京都拘置所 (Kyoto Kōchisho)
- Interactive map of Kyoto Detention House 京都拘置所 (Kyoto Kōchisho)
- Location: Kyoto, Kyoto Prefecture, Japan; 34.9649°N 135.7544°E
- Status: Operational
- Opened: September 1924; 101 years ago
- Managed by: Ministry of Justice Corrections Bureau, Osaka Regional Corrections Headquarters

Kyoto Detention House (京都拘置所, Kyoto Kōchisho) is a correctional facility in Fushimi-ku, Kyoto. A part of the penal system of Japan, it is operated by the Ministry of Justice.

The prison covers an area of 2.7ha.
