= Headquarters for Earthquake Research Promotion =

Japanese government agency

- Japanese: 地震調査研究推進本部
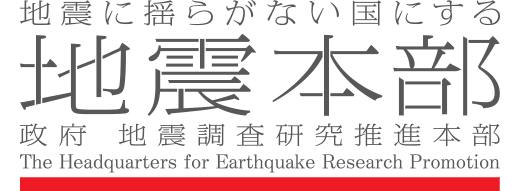

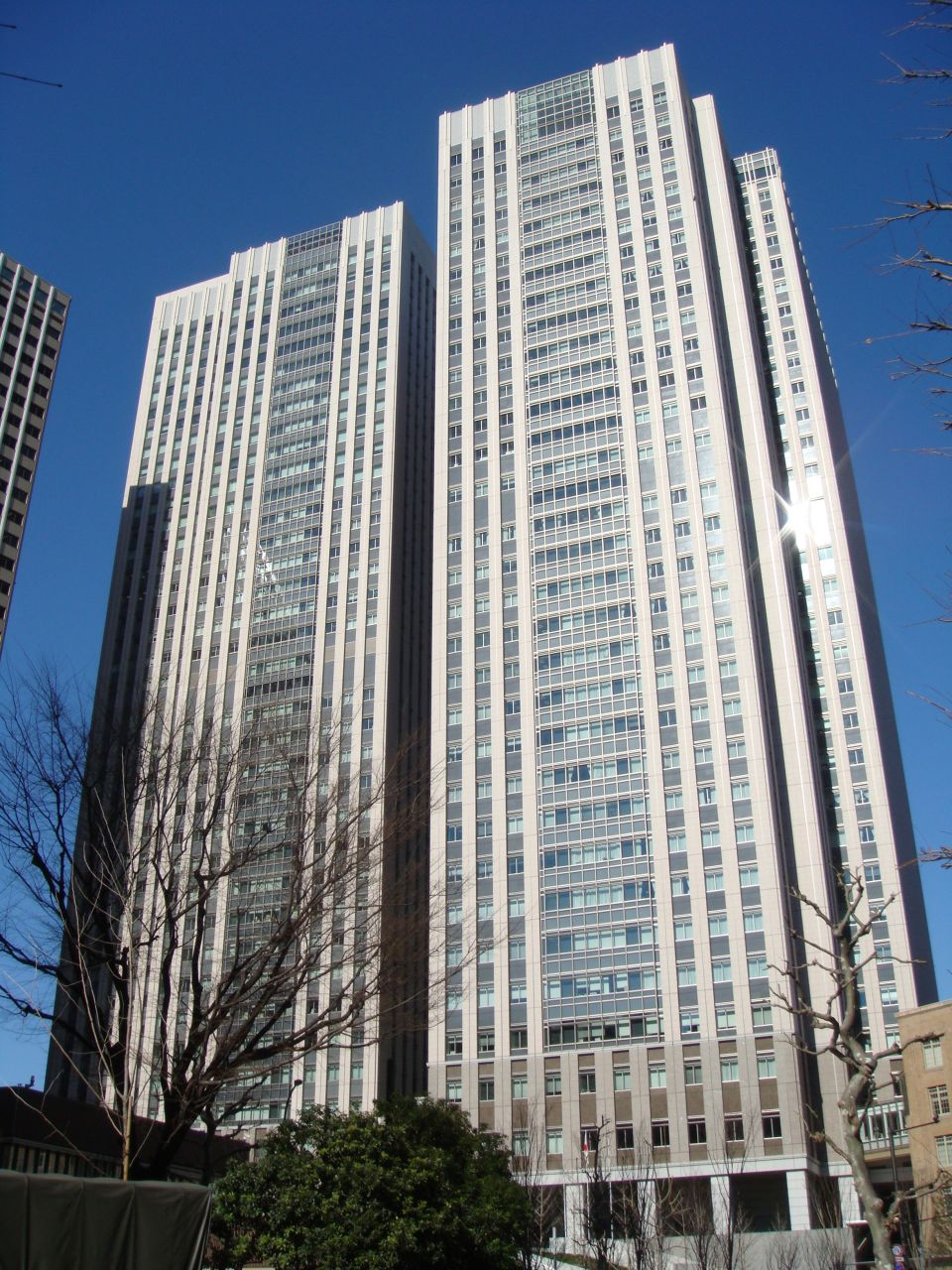
- The Headquarters for Earthquake Research Promotion is housed within the Kasumigaseki Common Gate buildings.

Extraordinary organ overview
- Formed: 18 July 1995
- Jurisdiction: Cabinet of Japan
- Headquarters: 3-3-2 Kasumigaseki, Chiyoda, Tokyo 100-8959; 35.6716°N 139.7485°E
- Parent Ministry: Ministry of Education, Culture, Sports, Science and Technology
- Website: jishin.go.jp

The Headquarters for Earthquake Research Promotion (地震調査研究推進本部, Jishin Chōsa Kenkyū Suishin Honbu) is an extraordinary organ of the Japanese Ministry of Education, Culture, Sports, Science and Technology. It was established in 1995, as a response to the damage caused by the Great Hanshin earthquake, to promote research on earthquakes in order to minimize their potential for destruction.

== Overview ==
The Great Hanshin Earthquake on 17 January 1995 killed 6,434 people and destroyed over 100,000 buildings. The earthquake caused the greatest amount of damage and loss of life in Japan since the end of World War II. It also brought to light a number of problems in the national earthquake disaster prevention measures at the time.

Based on these problems, the Special Measure Law on Earthquake Disaster Prevention (地震防災対策特別措置法) was enacted by legislators in July 1995. It was designed to promote a comprehensive national policy on earthquake disaster prevention.

The law recognized that the national system had failed to sufficiently communicate and apply the results of earthquake research to general public and disaster prevention organizations. As a result, the Headquarters for Earthquake Research Promotion was established in accordance with this law as a special governmental organization attached to the Prime Minister's Office (it now belongs to the Ministry of Education, Culture, Sports, Science and Technology). It was established in order to clarify the systems of responsibility regarding earthquake research that is directly connected to government policy. It manages this in an integrated fashion with a governmental capacity.

== Objectives and roles ==
=== Basic objective ===
To promote research of earthquakes in order to strengthen earthquake disaster prevention measures, especially for the reduction of damage from earthquake.

=== Roles ===
1. Planning of comprehensive and basic policies
2. Coordination of budgets and other administrative work with related governmental organizations
3. Establishment of comprehensive survey and observation plans
4. Collection, arrangement, analyses and comprehensive evaluation of survey results by related governmental organizations, universities, etc.
5. Publication based on the above evaluations

== Composition ==
The Headquarters for Earthquake Research Promotion consists of a director (the Minister of Education, Culture, Sports, Science and Technology) and staff members (such as the vice ministers of related ministries and agencies). Underneath them are the "Policy Committee" and the "Earthquake Research Committee," composed of staff from related government offices and academia.

The "Policy Committee" implements the planning of basic policy concerning the promotion of earthquake research. It also coordinates budgets and other administrative work and deals with matters such as evaluation-based publications.

The "Earthquake Research Committee" holds regular meetings on a monthly basis and classifies and analyzes research and observation results, as well as study outcomes. It does this in order to evaluate seismic activity in a comprehensive manner and to publish evaluation results. In addition, ad hoc meetings are held in response to damaging earthquakes or marked seismic activity. The meeting seeks to assess the current activity and the probability of aftershocks.
