= Xiangshan County, Zhejiang =

Xiangshan 象山县 Siangshan
- County
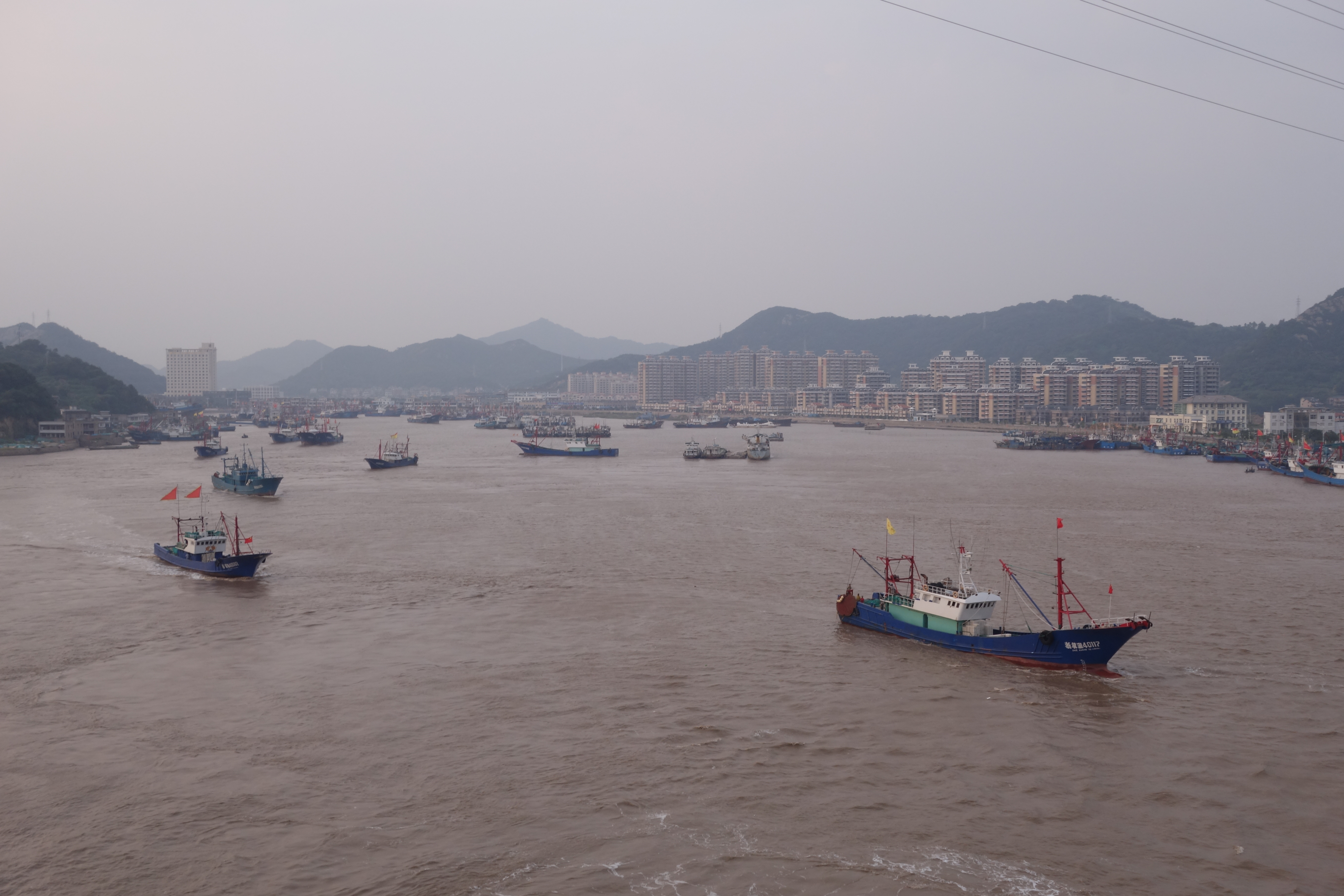

- Xiangshan County in Ningbo Municipality

- Location of the seat in Zhejiang
- Coordinates: 29.475°N 121.866°E
- Country: People's Republic of China
- Province: Zhejiang
- Sub-provincial city: Ningbo

Area
  - Total: 1,393.82 km^{2} (538.16 sq mi)

Population (2020)
  - Total: 567,600
  - Density: 407.2/km^{2} (1,055/sq mi)
- Time zone: UTC+8 (China Standard)
- Website: www.xiangshan.gov.cn

Xiangshan
- Chinese: 象山
- Postal: Siangshan
Transcriptions
Standard Mandarin
- Hanyu Pinyin: Xiàngshān
- Wade–Giles: Hsiang^{4}-shan^{1}

Xiangshan County (Chinese: 象山县; pinyin: Xiàngshān Xiàn) is a county in the east of Zhejiang province, China. It is under the administration of the city of Ningbo.

== Administrative divisions ==
Subdistricts:

- Dandong Subdistrict (丹东街道), Danxi Subdistrict (丹西街道), Juexi Subdistrict (爵溪街道)

Towns:

- Dingtang (定塘镇), Daxu (大徐镇), Hepu (鹤浦镇), Qiangtou (墙头镇), Shipu (石浦镇), Sizhoutou (泗洲头镇), Tuci (涂茨镇), Xinqiao (新桥镇), Xianyang (贤庠镇), Xizhou (西周镇)

Townships:

- Dongchen Township (东陈乡), Gaotangdao Township (高塘岛乡), Huangbi'ao Township (黄避岙乡), Maoyang Township (茅洋乡), Xiaotang Township (晓塘乡)

== Climate ==
Climate data for Xiangshan, elevation 6 m (20 ft), (1991–2020 normals, extremes 1991–present)
Month	Jan	Feb	Mar	Apr	May	Jun	Jul	Aug	Sep	Oct	Nov	Dec	Year
Record high °C (°F)	26.9 (80.4)	28.3 (82.9)	30.5 (86.9)	31.4 (88.5)	34.2 (93.6)	38.0 (100.4)	39.7 (103.5)	40.5 (104.9)	36.5 (97.7)	34.9 (94.8)	29.2 (84.6)	23.8 (74.8)	40.5 (104.9)
Mean daily maximum °C (°F)	10.5 (50.9)	12.0 (53.6)	15.7 (60.3)	20.6 (69.1)	25.0 (77.0)	27.9 (82.2)	32.7 (90.9)	32.6 (90.7)	28.6 (83.5)	24.5 (76.1)	19.0 (66.2)	13.2 (55.8)	21.9 (71.4)
Daily mean °C (°F)	6.6 (43.9)	7.7 (45.9)	11.3 (52.3)	16.0 (60.8)	20.9 (69.6)	24.4 (75.9)	28.9 (84.0)	28.8 (83.8)	25.0 (77.0)	20.3 (68.5)	14.9 (58.8)	8.8 (47.8)	17.8 (64.0)
Mean daily minimum °C (°F)	3.7 (38.7)	4.6 (40.3)	7.6 (45.7)	12.2 (54.0)	17.5 (63.5)	21.8 (71.2)	25.9 (78.6)	25.9 (78.6)	22.1 (71.8)	17.1 (62.8)	11.7 (53.1)	5.5 (41.9)	14.6 (58.4)
Record low °C (°F)	−7.2 (19.0)	−4.5 (23.9)	−2.7 (27.1)	2.0 (35.6)	8.6 (47.5)	14.2 (57.6)	17.5 (63.5)	18.8 (65.8)	14.7 (58.5)	9.3 (48.7)	−1.2 (29.8)	−4.9 (23.2)	−7.2 (19.0)
Average precipitation mm (inches)	68.8 (2.71)	79.7 (3.14)	116.6 (4.59)	106.4 (4.19)	126.9 (5.00)	262.0 (10.31)	136.1 (5.36)	203.9 (8.03)	215.3 (8.48)	109.0 (4.29)	97.2 (3.83)	67.3 (2.65)	1,589.2 (62.58)
Average precipitation days (≥ 0.1 mm)	12.5	12.3	14.6	13.6	13.0	18.7	12.2	13.9	13.8	8.2	12.5	10.6	155.9
Average snowy days	2.0	1.4	0.1	0	0	0	0	0	0	0	0	0.8	4.3
Average relative humidity (%)	74	76	76	76	78	85	78	79	80	76	78	72	77
Mean monthly sunshine hours	90.1	92.6	128.3	141.2	141.3	87.9	193.7	198.6	132.5	137.9	96.7	111.6	1,552.4
Percentage possible sunshine	28	29	34	36	33	21	46	49	36	39	30	35	35
Source: China Meteorological Administrationall-time May low

Climate data for Shipu Town, Xiangshan, elevation 128 m (420 ft), (1991–2020 normals, extremes 1981–present)
Month	Jan	Feb	Mar	Apr	May	Jun	Jul	Aug	Sep	Oct	Nov	Dec	Year
Record high °C (°F)	22.3 (72.1)	24.5 (76.1)	26.9 (80.4)	29.8 (85.6)	30.6 (87.1)	34.8 (94.6)	38.1 (100.6)	36.7 (98.1)	35.0 (95.0)	33.8 (92.8)	28.1 (82.6)	23.9 (75.0)	38.1 (100.6)
Mean daily maximum °C (°F)	10.0 (50.0)	11.2 (52.2)	14.1 (57.4)	19.0 (66.2)	23.3 (73.9)	26.5 (79.7)	30.9 (87.6)	31.3 (88.3)	27.9 (82.2)	23.6 (74.5)	18.6 (65.5)	12.8 (55.0)	20.8 (69.4)
Daily mean °C (°F)	6.4 (43.5)	7.3 (45.1)	10.2 (50.4)	14.9 (58.8)	19.6 (67.3)	23.1 (73.6)	27.1 (80.8)	27.5 (81.5)	24.3 (75.7)	19.9 (67.8)	14.8 (58.6)	9.0 (48.2)	17.0 (62.6)
Mean daily minimum °C (°F)	3.8 (38.8)	4.7 (40.5)	7.6 (45.7)	12.1 (53.8)	17.1 (62.8)	21.0 (69.8)	24.9 (76.8)	25.2 (77.4)	22.0 (71.6)	17.4 (63.3)	12.3 (54.1)	6.3 (43.3)	14.5 (58.2)
Record low °C (°F)	−6.4 (20.5)	−4.6 (23.7)	−2.3 (27.9)	3.1 (37.6)	8.6 (47.5)	12.9 (55.2)	18.9 (66.0)	19.6 (67.3)	14.6 (58.3)	6.9 (44.4)	0.2 (32.4)	−6.4 (20.5)	−6.4 (20.5)
Average precipitation mm (inches)	71.9 (2.83)	74.3 (2.93)	129.9 (5.11)	115.7 (4.56)	129.0 (5.08)	224.0 (8.82)	109.4 (4.31)	175.8 (6.92)	176.7 (6.96)	93.4 (3.68)	84.1 (3.31)	64.7 (2.55)	1,448.9 (57.06)
Average precipitation days (≥ 0.1 mm)	11.7	12.0	16.4	15.0	14.7	17.8	10.7	13.1	12.1	8.5	10.7	10.3	153
Average snowy days	2.4	1.8	0.7	0	0	0	0	0	0	0	0	0.8	5.7
Average relative humidity (%)	74	77	80	81	85	90	86	84	82	76	76	72	80
Mean monthly sunshine hours	113.7	107.0	122.5	140.5	144.1	115.7	223.3	217.1	167.3	169.8	124.6	131.7	1,777.3
Percentage possible sunshine	35	34	33	36	34	28	52	54	46	48	39	42	40
Source: China Meteorological Administration All-time Oct extreme

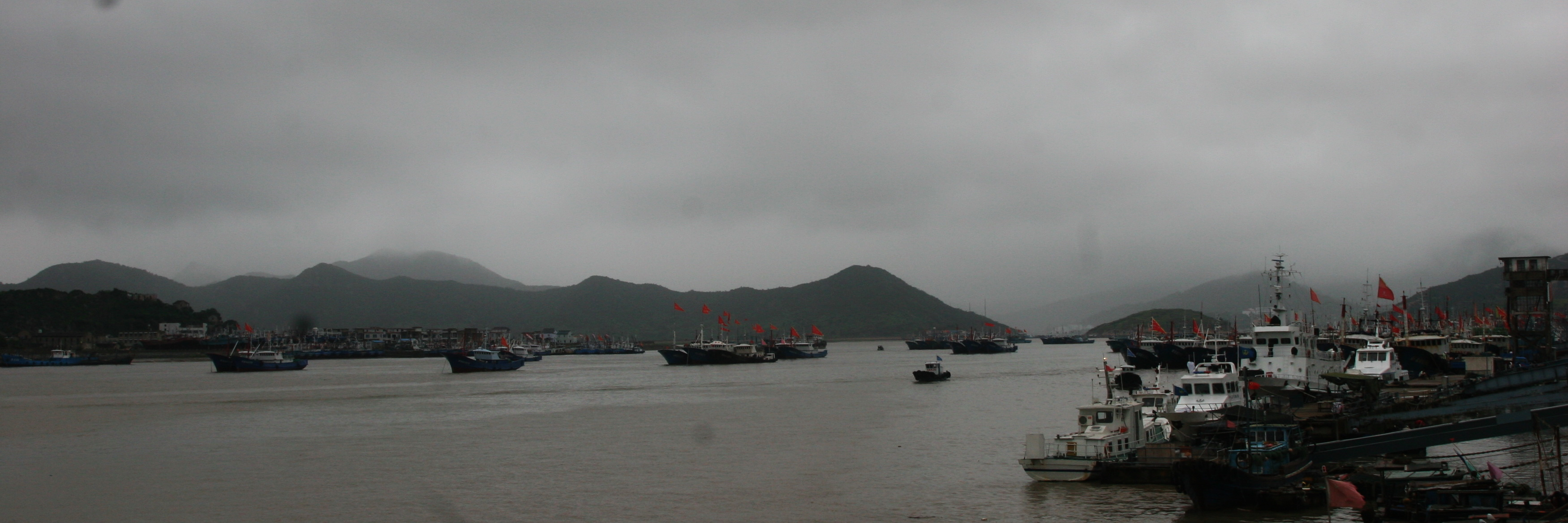
Shipu Harbour in Xiangshan County
