= Tongshan, Xuzhou =

Tongshan 铜山区 Tungshan
- District
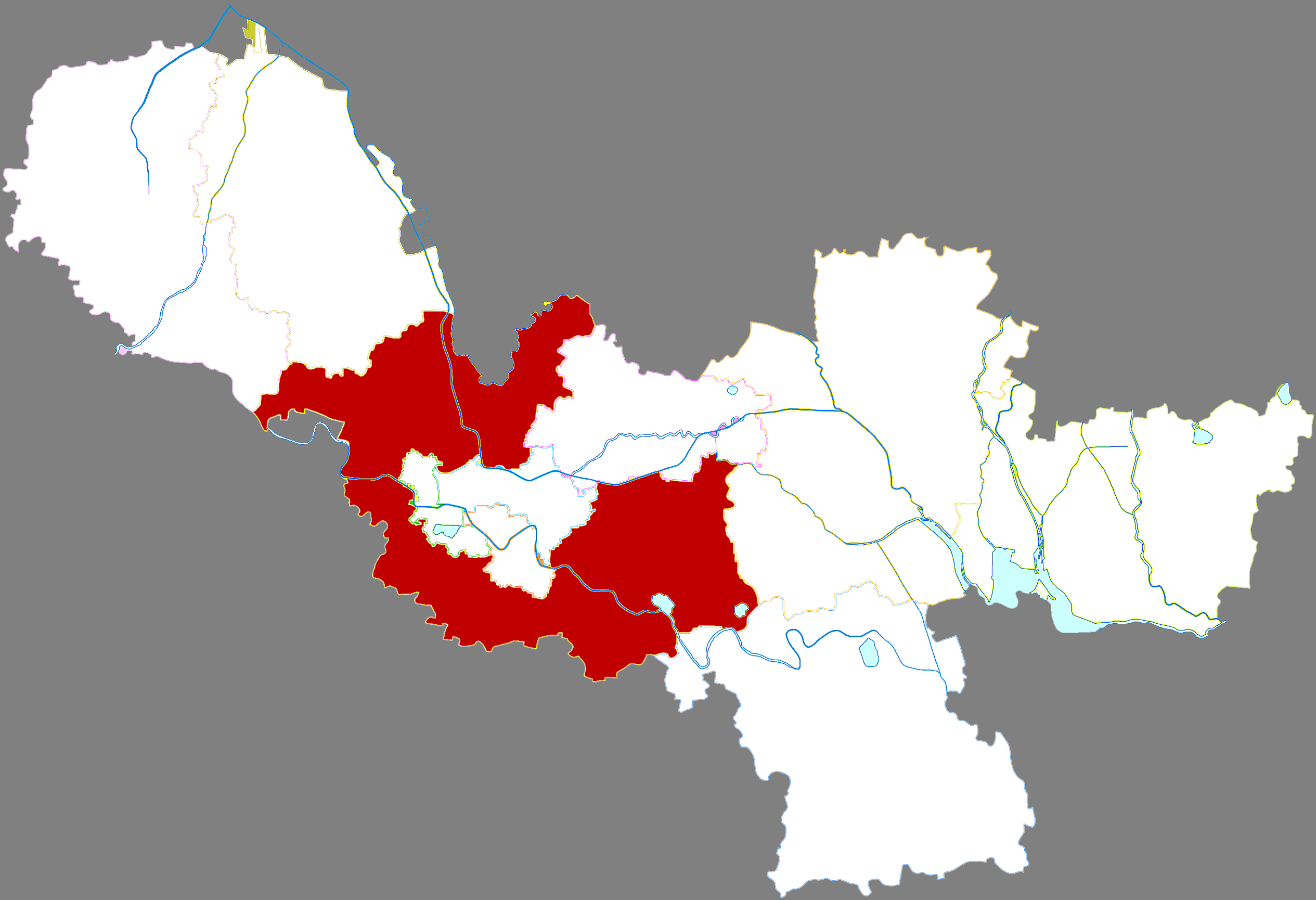
- Location in Xuzhou

- Xuzhou in Jiangsu
- Coordinates: 34°18′28″N 117°15′24″E
- Country: People's Republic of China
- Province: Jiangsu
- Prefecture-level city: Xuzhou

Area
  - Total: 2,003.98 km^{2} (773.74 sq mi)
- Elevation: 35 m (115 ft)

Population (2019)
  - Total: 1,331,500
  - Density: 664.43/km^{2} (1,720.9/sq mi)
- Time zone: UTC+8 (China Standard)
- Postal Code: 221100
- Website: www.zgts.gov.cn

Tongshan District (simplified Chinese: 铜山区; traditional Chinese: 銅山區; pinyin: Tóngshān Qū; lit. 'bronze mountain'), formerly Tongshan County (铜山县; 銅山縣; Tóngshān Xiàn), is one of six districts of Xuzhou, Jiangsu province, People's Republic of China, bordering Anhui and Shandong provinces.

== History ==
Tongshan was originally knows as Pengcheng County, the latter merged into Xuzhou during the Yuan and the Ming dynasties, also in the early Qing dynasty. In 1733, as Xuzhou became a prefecture (fu) from an independent department (zhili zhou), its department proper was separated and renamed "Tongshan" (literally: copper-filled hill), which derives from an island in the Weishan Lake.

Tongshan was once the metropolitan county (shou xian) of Xuzhou, thus it referred to the prefecture since 1912, until the Japanese Army captured the county and made Xuzhou City its urban area in 1939.

The county was dissolved in 1952, but was restored in the next year. It became a district since 2010.

== Administrative divisions ==
In the present day, Tongshan District has 8 subdistricts and 20 towns.

8 subdistricts

- Yi'an (义安街道)
- Liguo (利国街道)
- Chacheng (垞城街道)
- Dianchang (电厂街道)
- Zhangshuanglou (张双楼街道)
- Sanhejian (三河尖街道)
- Shitun (拾屯街道)
- Zhangji (张集街道)

20 towns

- Tongshan (铜山镇)
- Heqiao (何桥镇)
- Huangji (黄集镇)
- Mapo (马坡镇)
- Zhengji (郑集镇)
- Liuxin (柳新镇)
- Liuji (刘集镇)
- Dapeng (大彭镇)
- Hanwang (汉王镇)
- Sanbao (三堡镇)
- Tangzhang (棠张镇)
- Zhangji (张集镇)
- Fangcun (房村镇)
- Yizhuang (伊庄镇)
- Danji (单集镇)
- Xuzhuang (徐庄镇)
- Daxu (大许镇)
- Maocun (茅村镇)
- Liuquan (柳泉镇)
- Liguo (利国镇)
