= Daxue =

Daxue may refer to:

- Daxue (solar term) (大雪), 21st solar term in traditional East Asian calendars
- Da Xue, or Great Learning (大學), one of the "Four Books" in Confucianism
- Daxue Mountains (大雪山腰), mountain range in western Sichuan, China
- Daxue Mountain (大雪山), in Shangri-La County, Yunnan, China
- Daxue (town) (大峃镇), in Wencheng County, Zhejiang, China

== See also ==
- 大學 (disambiguation) (pinyin: Dàxué)
