= Daigaku =

Daigaku (大学 or 大學) is the Japanese word for "college" or "university". See a list of universities in Japan for specific universities.

It may also refer to:

- Daigaku (大学), the Japanese title of Great Learning, one of the "Four Books" in Confucianism
- Daigaku Honyaku Center (est. 1972), a Japanese manufacturer of cosmetics and health food supplements in Tokyo, Japan
- Daigaku Horiguchi (堀口大學, 1892–1981), a poet and translator of French literature in Taishō and Shōwa period Japan
- Daigaku Munemasa (大岳 宗正, born 1965), sumo wrestler
- Daigaku Megusuri (大学目薬), the former name of Santen Pharmaceutical, a Japanese pharmaceutical company
- Daigaku wa Detakeredo... (大学は出たけれど), the Japanese title of I Graduated, But..., a 1929 Japanese silent film directed by Yasujirō Ozu
- Daigaku-no-kami, a Japanese Imperial court position and the title of the chief education expert in the rigid court hierarchy
- Daigaku-ryō, the former Imperial university of Japan, founded at the end of the 7th century
- Onna Daigaku, an 18th-century Japanese educational text

== See also ==
- Daigaku Station (disambiguation)
- Imperial Universities
- Daigakkō
