= Public Prosecutors Office (Japan) =

Agency for conducting prosecution in Japan

- Japanese: 検察庁
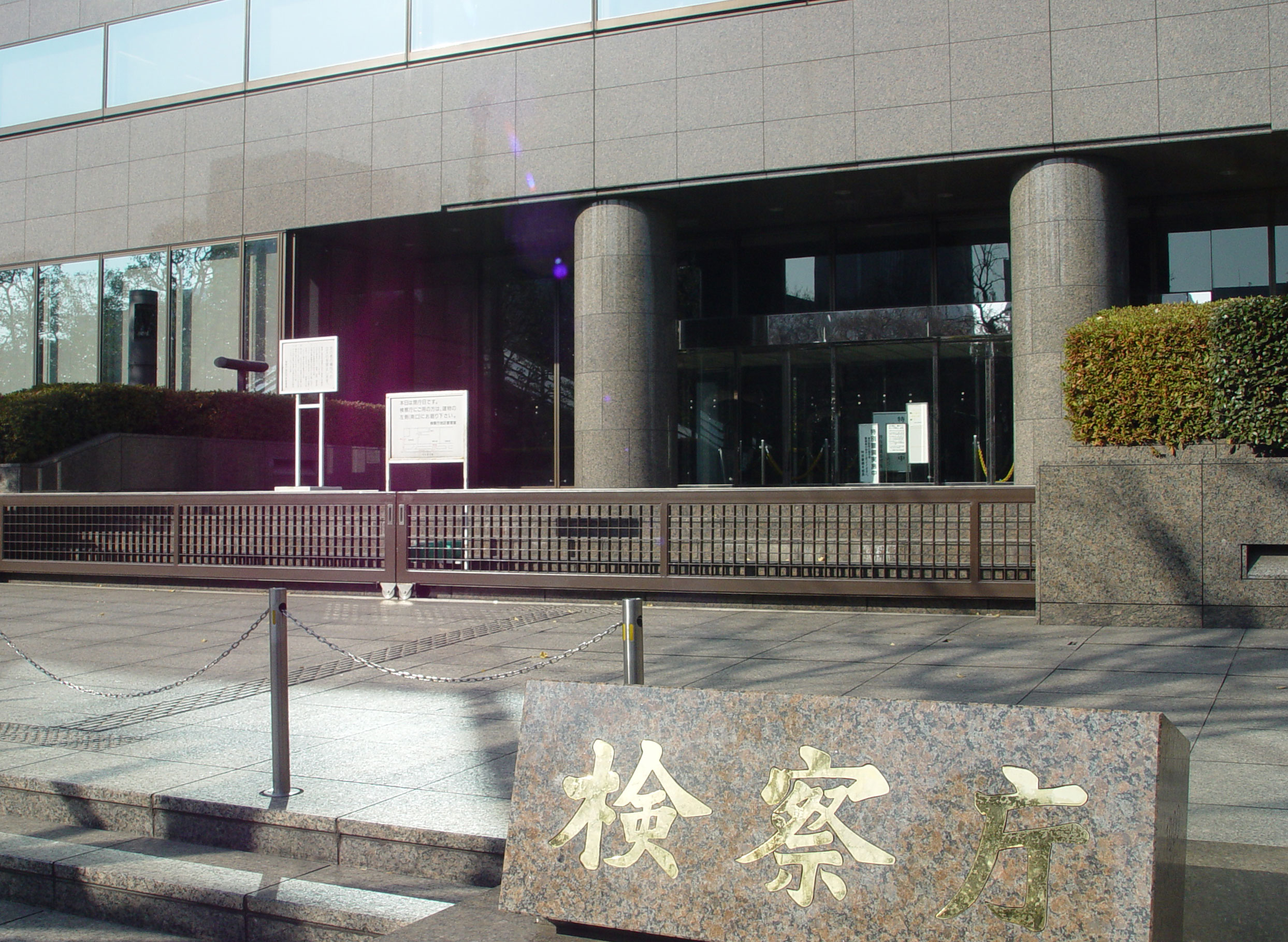
- Public Prosecutors Offices building in Tokyo

Agency overview
- Formed: May 3, 1947
- Preceding agency: Prosecution Department (検事局, Kenji-kyoku) of the Courts
- Jurisdiction: Japan
- Employees: 11,863 (2020–21)
- Minister responsible: Naomi Unemoto (on administrative leave), Prosecutor-General
- Deputy Minister responsible: Hiroshi Yamamoto, Deputy Prosecutor-General
- Parent agency: Ministry of Justice (法務省, Hōmu-shō)
- Website: www.kensatsu.go.jp

The Public Prosecutors Office (検察庁, Kensatsu-chō) is the agency for conducting prosecution in Japan. It is an extraordinary organ (特別の機関, Tokubetsu no Kikan) under the Ministry of Justice (法務省, Hōmu-shō). It consists of four tiers of offices: the Supreme Public Prosecutors Office; the High Public Prosecutors Offices (8), the District Public Prosecutors Offices (50); and the Local Public Prosecutors Offices (438).

== History ==
In 1872, Japan introduced a modern prosecution system following the French system. The 1880 Act provided that public prosecutors had exclusive power of prosecution and it was enforced in 1882. However, the then system adopted preliminary hearings and collection of evidence was placed on pretrial judges. The prosecution department was attached to the courts in 1890.

After the World War II, Japan enacted the new Constitution in 1946, which stipulates the principle of separation of powers, and thus, the prosecution department needed to be separated from the courts. The Public Prosecutor's Office Act (検察庁法, Kensatsu-chō Hō), which established the current prosecution organisations, was enforced on the same day as the new Constitution, 3 May 1947.

== People ==
=== Prosecutors ===
The law provides that the Public Prosecutors Office is where the work of public prosecutors (検察官, Kensatsu-kan) is unified. It lays down five ranks of public prosecutors: the Prosecutor-General, the Deputy Prosecutor-General, the Superintending Prosecutors, Public Prosecutors and Assistant Prosecutors.

The prosecutors' independence and impartiality are protected by law with some exceptions under Article 25 of the PPO, such as retirement age, physical/mental disability or supernumerary officials.

==== Prosecutor-General, Deputy Prosecutor-General and Superintending Prosecutors ====
The Prosecutor-General (検事総長, Kenji Sōchō) heads the Supreme Public Prosecutors Office. The Deputy Prosecutor-General (次長検事, Jichō Kenji) belongs to the Supreme Public Prosecutors Office and assists the Prosecutor-General. The Prosecutor-General supervises all the staff of the Public Prosecutors Office. Although the Minister of Justice may give general directions on criminal investigation and trial to prosecutors, the Minister can direct only the Prosecutor-General regarding a specific case.

The Superintending Prosecutors (検事長, Kenji-chō) head the High Public Prosecutors Offices and supervise the staff within the jurisdiction.

The appointment and removal of these offices (10 prosecutors) are decided by the Cabinet and attested by the Emperor.

The retirement age of the Prosecutor-General is 65, while that of all the other prosecutors is 63, including the Deputy Prosecutor-General and the Superintending Prosecutors.

==== Public Prosecutors ====
Public Prosecutors (検事, Kenji) are assigned to one of the Public Prosecutors Offices and engaged in prosecution. They have the power to investigate any crimes, as well as issue orders to the police about specific investigations. Also, they have the authority to prosecute criminal cases. The Japanese law allows a public prosecutor not to prosecute a suspect when the prosecution is unnecessary due to the circumstances such as his/her age or the gravity of the offence. A suspect will be prosecuted if and only if it is obvious based on evidence that he/she has committed a crime in question and the prosecutor finds it necessary to prosecute him/her.

Public Prosecutors are usually appointed from those who have passed the bar exam (司法試験, Shihō Shiken) and finished the legal apprenticeship (司法修習, Shihō Shūshū). As of 1 July 2019, 1,788 Public Prosecutors work for the Public Prosecutors Office, while 153 are posted to other ministries or agencies.

Each District Public Prosecutors Office is headed by a Chief Prosecutor (検事正, Kenji-sei) assigned among experienced Public Prosecutors.

==== Assistant Prosecutors ====
Assistant Prosecutors (副検事, Fuku-Kenji) are assigned to one of the Local Public Prosecutors Offices. They have the same authority to investigate and prosecute crimes as Public Prosecutors, though they usually deal with less serious cases.

Assistant Prosecutors are appointed from those who were particular public officials such as prosecutors' assistant officers and police officers and have passed the exam to become assistant prosecutors. As of 1 July 2019, 770 Assistant Prosecutors work for the Public Prosecutors Office.

=== Assistant Officers ===
There are more than 9,000 Prosecutors' Assistant Officers (検察事務官, Kensatsu Jimu-kan) in the Public Prosecutors Office. They assist public prosecutors in conducting investigations and trials, and also carry out investigations themselves under public prosecutors' direction. They assume a wide-ranging role in the Public Prosecutors Office, including work related to prosecution, such as safekeeping of evidence, and general affairs, such as accounts.

== Organisation ==
=== Supreme Public Prosecutors Office ===
The Supreme Public Prosecutors Office (最高検察庁, Saikō Kensatsu-chō; abbr. as 最高検 Saikōken) is located in Tokyo. It is the counterpart of the Supreme Court. It deals with criminal cases in which the High Courts' judgements have been appealed to the Supreme Court.

==== Location ====
- 1-1-1, Kasumigaseki, Chiyoda, Tokyo

==== Structure ====
The SPPO is structured as of 2021:

- Secretariat
  - General Affairs Department
  - Inspection and Guidance Department
  - Criminal Affairs Department
  - Public Security Department
  - Trial Department

==== Executives ====
As of 12 February 2020, executives of the Supreme Public Prosecutors Office are as follows:

Office	Executive	Date of appointment	Prior office
Prosecutor-General	Nobuo Inada	25 July 2018	Superintending Prosecutor, Tokyo High Public Prosecutors Office
Deputy Prosecutor-General	Toru Sakai	25 July 2018	Superintending Prosecutor, Sendai High Public Prosecutors Office
Director-General, General Affairs Department	Naomi Unemoto	16 July 2019	Director-General, Inspection and Guidance Department, Supreme Public Prosecutors Office
Director-General, Inspection and Guidance Department	Taiji Oyama	9 January 2020	Director-General, Criminal Affairs Bureau, Ministry of Justice
Director-General, Criminal Affairs Department	Yoshikazu Ochiai	26 February 2018	Chief Prosecutor, Saitama District Public Prosecutors Office
Director-General, Public Security Department	Hideaki Yamagami	2 September 2019	Deputy Superintending Prosecutor, Tokyo High Public Prosecutors Office
Director-General, Trial Department	Masaki Wada	18 January 2019	Director-General, Immigration Bureau, Ministry of Justice

=== High Public Prosecutors Offices ===
Locations of High Public Prosecutors Offices

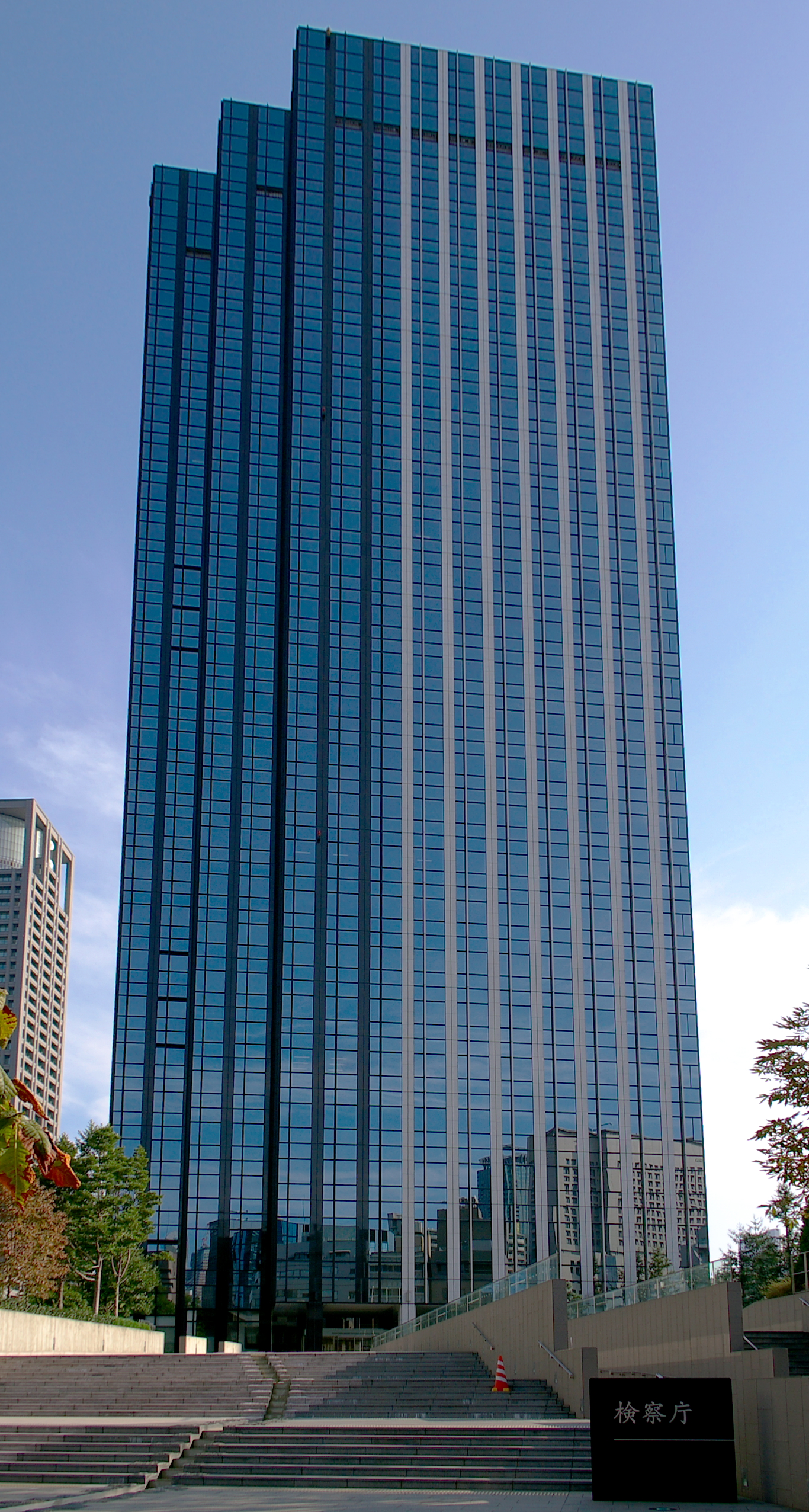
Public Prosecutors Offices building in Osaka

The High Public Prosecutors Offices (高等検察庁, Kōtō Kensatsu-chō; abbr. as 高検 Kōken) are located in 8 major cities in Japan: Tokyo, Osaka, Nagoya, Hiroshima, Fukuoka, Sendai, Sapporo and Takamatsu. Some of the High Public Prosecutors Offices have their branches. These locations correspond to those of the High Courts and their branches.

The High Public Prosecutors Offices deal with criminal cases appealed to the High Courts. In addition, the Tokyo High Public Prosecutors Office is responsible for the detention of a fugitive for the purpose of extradition upon a request from a foreign country.

List of High Public Prosecutors Offices
High Public Prosecutors Office	Superintending Prosecutor	Deputy Superintending Prosecutor	District Public Prosecutors Offices within the jurisdiction
Tokyo	Ryuji Kawahara	Eiji Ito	Tokyo, Yokohama, Saitama, Chiba, Mito, Utsunomiya, Maebashi, Shizuoka, Kofu, Nagano and Niigata
Osaka	Hiroshi Kikuchi	Tsuyoshi Unemoto	Osaka, Kyoto, Kobe, Nara, Otsu and Wakayama
Nagoya	Yutaka Matsumoto	Yumiko Kawase	Nagoya, Tsu and Gifu
Kanazawa Branch	Yutaka Matsumoto	Yumiko Kawase	Fukui, Kanazawa and Toyama
Hiroshima	Hirokazu Urata	Yuriko Tsunekawa	Hiroshima and Yamaguchi
Okayama Branch	Hirokazu Urata	Yuriko Tsunekawa	Okayama
Matsue Branch	Hirokazu Urata	Yuriko Tsunekawa	Tottori and Matsue
Fukuoka	Machiko Yamamoto	Takafumi Sato	Fukuoka, Saga, Nagasaki, Oita and Kumamoto
Miyazaki Branch	Machiko Yamamoto	Takafumi Sato	Kagoshima and Miyazaki
Naha Branch	Machiko Yamamoto	Takafumi Sato	Naha
Sendai	Fumihiko Koyuba	Miyuki Sato	Sendai, Fukushima, Yamagata, Morioka and Aomori
Akita Branch	Fumihiko Koyuba	Miyuki Sato	Akita
Sapporo	Toshiyuki Yamada	Tomoaki Nitta	Sapporo, Hakodate, Asahikawa and Kushiro
Takamatsu	Takeshi Seto	Hisashi Yoshida	Takamatsu, Tokushima, Kochi and Matsuyama

=== District Public Prosecutors Offices ===
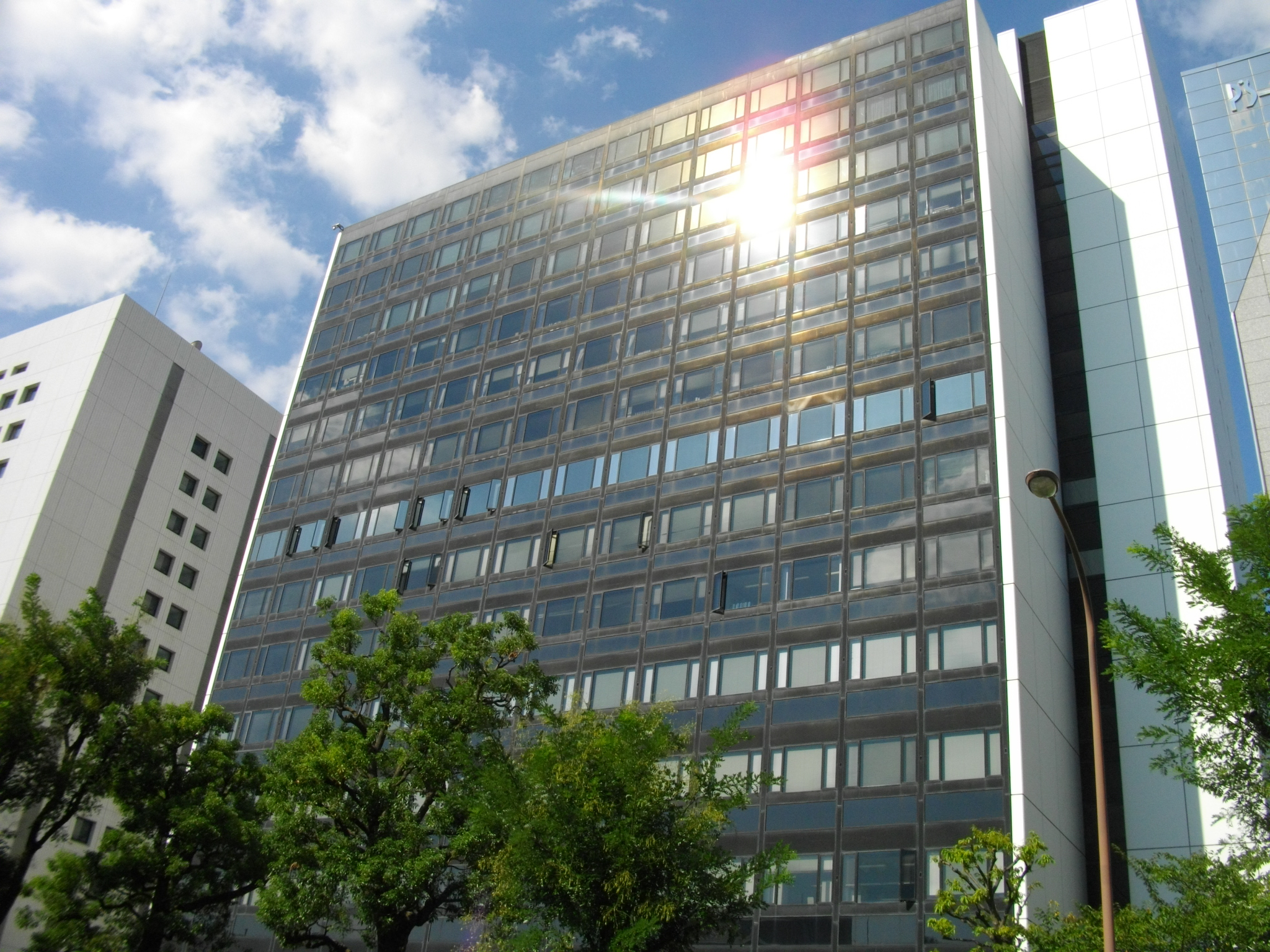
Special Investigation Dept. building in Tokyo

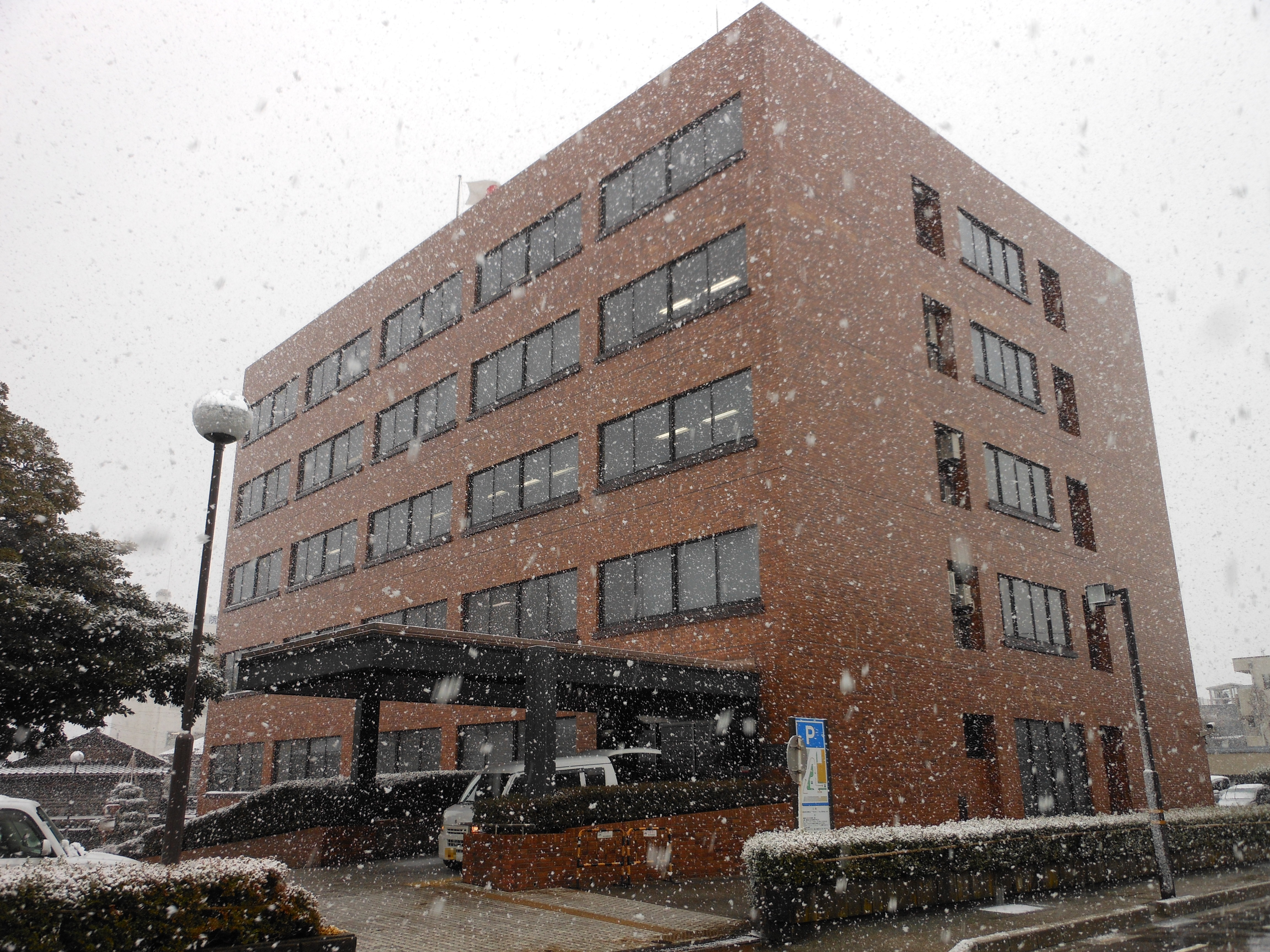
Public Prosecutors Offices building in Kanazawa

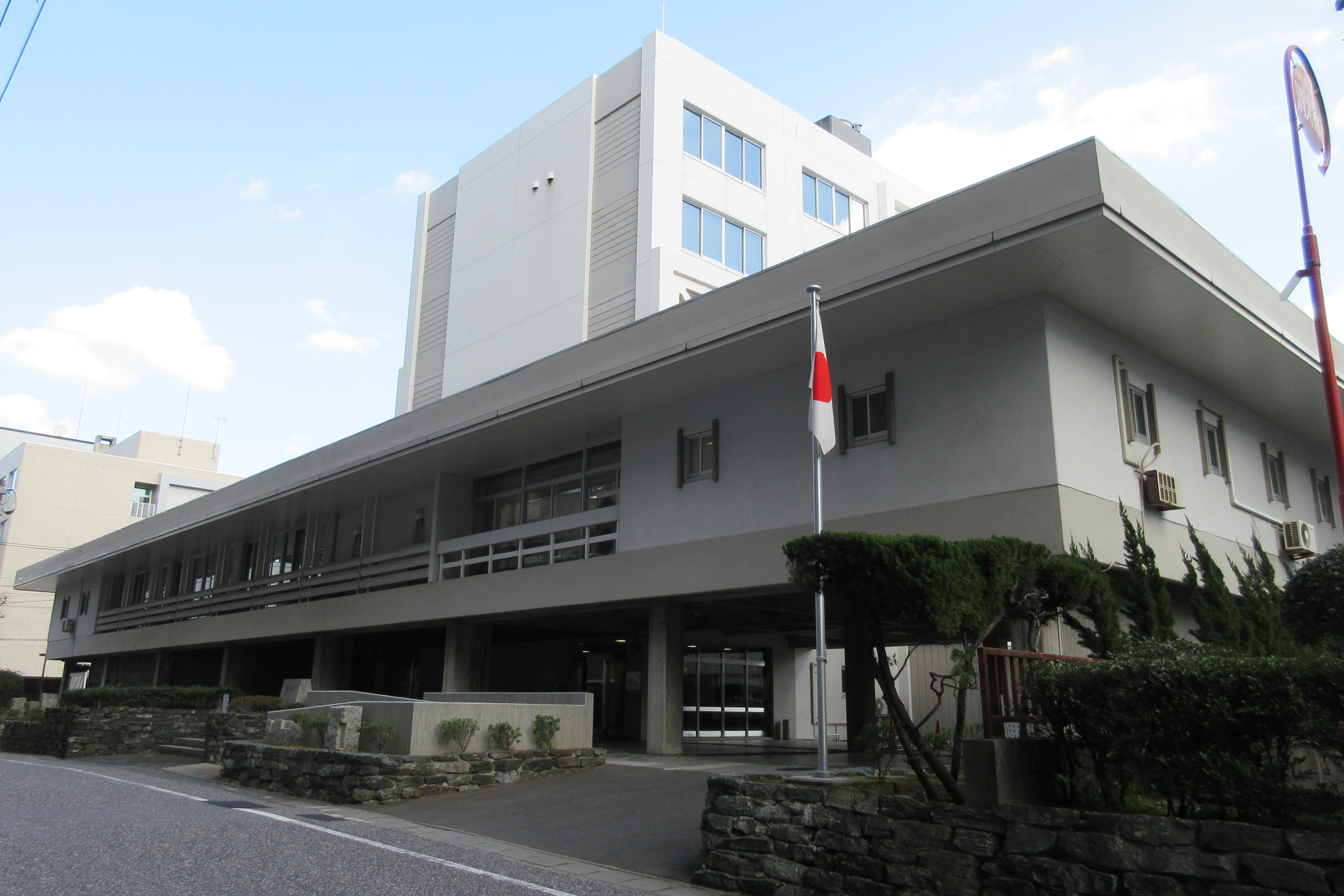
Public Prosecutors Offices building in Nagasaki

The District Public Prosecutors Offices (地方検察庁, Chihō Kensatsu-chō; abbr. as 地検 Chiken) are located in all the prefectural capitals (47) and 3 large cities in Hokkaido besides Sapporo. Most of them have their branches. These locations correspond to those of the District and the Family Courts and their branches.

Public prosecutors in the District Public Prosecutors Offices carry out investigations and trials of criminal cases. Most cases are referred to prosecutors by the police and other organisations such as customs, but some serious and complex cases are investigated by public prosecutors on their own. Some large District Public Prosecutors Offices have a dedicated investigation department (the Special Investigation Department (特別捜査部, Tokubetsu Sōsa-bu; abbr. as 特捜部 Tokusō-bu) or the Special Criminal Department (特別刑事部, Tokubetsu Keiji-bu)) for serious cases. In particular, many well-known cases are prosecuted by the Special Investigation Department of the Tokyo District Public Prosecutors Office (東京地方検察庁特別捜査部, Tōkyō Chihō Kensatsu-chō Tokubetsu Sōsa-bu; known as 東京地検特捜部 Tōkyō Chiken Tokusō-bu).

List of District Public Prosecutors Offices
District Public Prosecutors Office	Chief Prosecutor	Location	Branches
Tokyo	Tetsuya Sogi	Chiyoda, Tokyo	Tachikawa
Yokohama	Atsushi Kitamura	Yokohama, Kanagawa	Kawasaki, Sagamihara, Yokosuka and Odawara
Saitama	Seiji Yoshida	Saitama, Saitama	Koshigaya, Kawagoe, Kumagaya and Chichibu
Chiba	Masamichi Kamimura	Chiba, Chiba	Sakura, Ichinomiya, Matsudo, Kisarazu, Tateyama, Yokaichiba (Sosa) and Sawara (Katori)
Mito	Takashi Nishitani	Mito, Ibaraki	Hitachi, Tsuchiura, Ryugasaki, Aso (Namegata) and Shimotsuma
Utsunomiya	Masahiro Ono	Utsunomiya, Tochigi	Moka, Otawara, Tochigi and Ashikaga
Maebashi	Akira Ozu	Maebashi, Gumma	Numata, Ota, Kiryu and Takasaki
Shizuoka	Hisashi Takahashi	Shizuoka, Shizuoka	Numazu, Fuji, Shimoda, Hamamatsu and Kakegawa
Kofu	Hiroshi Takeuchi	Kofu, Yamanashi	Tsuru
Nagano	Haruhiko Ukawa	Nagano, Nagano	Ueda, Saku, Matsumoto, Suwa, Iida and Ina
Niigata	Shinji Iwayama	Niigata, Niigata	Sanjo, Shibata, Nagaoka, Takada (Joetsu) and Sado
Osaka	Yasuhiro Tanabe	Osaka, Osaka	Sakai and Kishiwada
Kyoto	Katsuhiro Hirokami	Kyoto, Kyoto	Sonobe (Nantan), Miyazu, Maizuru and Fukuchiyama
Kobe	Motoko Tanaka	Kobe, Hyogo	Itami, Amagasaki, Akashi, Kaibara (Tamba), Himeji, Yashiro (Kato), Tatsuno, Toyooka and Sumoto
Nara	Hideyuki Yamaguchi	Nara, Nara	Katsuragi (Yamatotakada) and Gojo
Otsu	Masayoshi Kimura	Otsu, Shiga	Hikone and Nagahama
Wakayama	Yukihiro Yamamoto	Wakayama, Wakayama	Tanabe, Gobo and Shingu
Nagoya	Yasushi Yoshida	Nagoya, Aichi	Ichinomiya, Handa, Okazaki and Toyohashi
Tsu	Yutaka Matsumoto	Tsu, Mie	Matsusaka, Iga, Yokkaichi, Ise and Kumano
Gifu	Kenzaburo Yazawa	Gifu, Gifu	Ogaki, Tajimi, Mitake and Takayama
Fukui	Takashi Ishii	Fukui, Fukui	Takefu (Echizen) and Tsuruga
Kanazawa	Makoto Uemura	Kanazawa, Ishikawa	Komatsu, Nanao and Wajima
Toyama	Takeru Tanojiri	Toyama, Toyama	Uozu and Takaoka
Hiroshima	Iwao Katayama	Hiroshima, Hiroshima	Kure, Onomichi, Fukuyama and Miyoshi
Yamaguchi	Nobuhiko Furuya	Yamaguchi, Yamaguchi	Shunan, Hagi, Iwakuni, Shimonoseki and Ube
Okayama	Tadatsugu Yamoto	Okayama, Okayama	Kurashiki, Niimi and Tsuyama
Tottori	Shunsuke Oka	Tottori, Tottori	Kurayoshi and Yonago
Matsue	Hiroshi Katsuyama	Matsue, Shimane	Izumo, Hamada, Masuda and Saigo (Okinoshima)
Fukuoka	Toshiaki Kataoka	Fukuoka, Fukuoka	Iizuka, Nogata, Kurume, Yanagawa, Omuta, Yame, Kokura (Kitakyushu), Yukuhashi and Tagawa
Saga	Fumihiko Koyuba	Saga, Saga	Takeo and Karatsu
Nagasaki	Hirotsugu Yoshiike	Nagasaki, Nagasaki	Omura, Shimabara, Sasebo, Hirado, Iki, Goto and Izuhara (Tsushima)
Oita	Munio Nagahata	Oita, Oita	Kitsuki, Saiki, Taketa, Nakatsu and Hita
Kumamoto	Yasumasa Kimura	Kumamoto, Kumamoto	Tamana, Yamaga, Aso, Yatsushiro, Hitoyoshi and Amakusa
Kagoshima	Koji Ishizaki	Kagoshima, Kagoshima	Naze (Amami), Kajiki (Aira), Chiran (Minamikyushu), Sendai (Satsumasendai) and Kanoya
Miyazaki	Toshiharu Kato	Miyazaki, Miyazaki	Nichinan, Miyakonojo and Nobeoka
Naha	Takashi Nakamura	Naha, Okinawa	Okinawa, Nago, Hirara (Miyakojima) and Ishigaki
Sendai	Kazuaki Morimoto	Sendai, Miyagi	Ogawara, Furukawa (Osaki), Ishinomaki, Tome and Kesennuma
Fukushima	Yukinobu Hayakawa	Fukushima, Fukushima	Soma, Koriyama, Shirakawa, Aizuwakamatsu and Iwaki
Yamagata	Hiroko Matsushita	Yamagata, Yamagata	Shinjo, Yonezawa, Tsuruoka and Sakata
Morioka	Yasushi Iijima	Morioka, Iwate	Hanamaki, Ninohe, Tono, Miyako, Ichinoseki and Mizusawa (Oshu)
Akita	Mariko Suzuki	Akita, Akita	Noshiro, Honjo (Yurihonjo), Odate, Yokote and Omagari (Daisen)
Aomori	Makoto Takahashi	Aomori, Aomori	Goshogawara, Hirosaki, Hachinohe and Towada
Sapporo	Hideyuki Hayashi	Sapporo, Hokkaido	Iwamizawa, Takikawa, Muroran, Tomakomai, Urakawa, Otaru and Iwanai
Hakodate	Takashi Mori	Hakodate, Hokkaido	Esashi
Asahikawa	Toshiyuki Yamada	Asahikawa, Hokkaido	Nayoro, Mombetsu, Rumoi and Wakkanai
Kushiro	Hiroki Ozaki	Kushiro, Hokkaido	Obihiro, Abashiri, Kitami and Nemuro
Takamatsu	Hisayoshi Nishimura	Takamatsu, Kagawa	Marugame and Kanonji
Tokushima	Masaaki Ozawa	Tokushima, Tokushima	Anan and Mima
Kochi	Koichi Takahashi	Kochi, Kochi	Susaki, Aki and Nakamura (Shimanto)
Matsuyama	Isao Shiraki	Matsuyama, Ehime	Ozu, Saijo, Imabari and Uwajima

=== Local Public Prosecutors Offices ===
The Local Public Prosecutors Offices (区検察庁, Ku Kensatsu-chō; abbr. as 区検 Kuken) deal with criminal investigations and trials of less serious offences. There are 438 offices throughout the country. Their locations correspond to those of the Local Courts.

== See also ==
- Attorneys in Japan
- Criminal justice system of Japan
- Judicial system of Japan
- Law of Japan
- Lay judges in Japan
