= Daigakkō =

Japanese term

Daigakkō (大学校, daigakkō) is a word used in names of some post-secondary educational institutions in Japan. The National Defense Academy of Japan (Bōei Daigakkō) was established with École Polytechnique as its model. Most institutions in Japan that use "daigakkō" as part of their name are not certified as degree-issuing secondary schools by the Japanese Ministry of Education, Culture, Sports, Science and Technology or National Institution for Academic Degrees and University Evaluation (NIAD-UE), an independent organization.

== Etymology ==
Daigakkō has a literal meaning of "grand school" or "great school". It comes from a literal translation of the French "grandes écoles". Common English translations include "academy", "college", or "university".

== Usage ==
=== Japan ===
In Japan, use of the word "daigakkō"(大学校) is not regulated by laws or ordinances, so many educational or training facilities are named as "daigakko". Those are categorized as follows:

1. The training facilities operated by the governmental offices such as ministries and agencies.
2. The lectures as lifelong learning for the citizens provided by local governments.
3. The educational facilities which are certified as they can provide education as same as Universities and Graduate schools, and which can provide academic degrees.
4. The educational facilities which provide higher education, but can't provide academic degrees.
5. The special schools named "daigakkō" before School Education Act in enforce in 1947.

=== Korea ===
In Korea, four-year universities and colleges are referred to as "大學校" (pronounced as "Taehakkyo" in Korean). Korea University ("朝鮮大學校", pronounced Chosŏn Taehakkyo in Korean) in Japan, which has a relationship with the North Korean government, but it can not provide any academic degrees recognized in Japan because it is not certified by the Japanese Ministry of Education.

== Daigakkō and other post-secondary institutions ==
Because usage of "daigakkō" in the title of an institution is not regulated by laws or ordinances, they offer a wide range of courses and degrees. These can include accredited, full-time, six-year courses, or single-day training courses. The institutions can be established by national or local governments, or by private organizations. Some are recognised as "specialized training colleges" (ja:専修学校, senshū gakkō) by the MEXT or "miscellaneous schools" (ja:各種学校, kakushu gakkō) by the local boards of education or the governors of the prefectures.

In the early Meiji era, the Imperial College of Engineering (工部大学校, Kōbu Daigakkō) was a mainstream higher education institution established by Monbushō (current MEXT). Current institutions certified by MEXT are either "daigaku" (大学) or "tanki daigaku" (短期大学, meaning "junior college").

== NIAD-UE accredited ==
Some daigakkō's mainstream courses are accredited by the National Institution for Academic Degrees and University Evaluation (NIAD-UE), an independent administrative institution (IAI) affiliated with MEXT. The graduates can obtain academic degrees awarded by the NIAD-UE by application.

=== National institutions ===
The following daigakkō are administered by the national government, and the tuition-fee is for free and the students are paid salary. In addition, these daigakkō are specially called "Shō-Chō-Daigakkō"(Ministry-Agency-Daigakkō, 省庁大学校) which are regulated to be founded by laws. The students in the following schools are appointed as government officials automatically when they entered, and they are paid salary every month, and they are exempted from paying tuition-fee. National Defense Medical College graduates who retire before serving nine years for the Japan Self-Defense Forces must repay their training costs. The following schools are the only daigakkō which are certified by NIAD-UE.

English name	Japanese orthography	Pronunciation	Abbreviation	Provider (national government)	Foundation	Degrees
Japan Coast Guard Academy	海上保安大学校	Kaijō Hoan Daigakkō	JCGA	Japan Coast Guard	1951	B
National College of Nursing (ko)	国立看護大学校	Kokuritsu Kango Daigakkō	NCN	National Center for Global Health and Medicine	2001	B, M
National Defense Academy of Japan	防衛大学校	Bōei Daigakkō	NDA; Bōei-Dai(防衛大)	Ministry of Defense	1952	B, M, D
National Defense Medical College	防衛医科大学校	Bōei Ika Daigakkō	NDMC	Ministry of Defense	1973	B, D
Meteorological College	気象大学校	Kishō Daigakkō	MC; Ki-Dai, Kidaikō	Japan Meteorological Agency	1922	B

=== Independent institutions ===
The mainstream students of these institutions must pay tuition fees similar to those at Japanese national universities.

- National Fisheries University (ja:水産大学校, Suisan Daigakkō) (NFU ): an IAI affiliated with the Ministry of Agriculture, Forestry and Fisheries. Offers: B, M.
- Polytechnic University (ja:職業能力開発総合大学校, Shokugyō Nōryoku Kaihatsu Sōgō Daigakkō) (PU ): an IAI affiliated with the MHLW. Offers: B, M.

== NIAD-UE unaccredited ==
=== Government administered ===
The government-run training courses for public servants. Note that institutions whose objectives and functions are similar but names are not daigakkō, and instead say gakkō ("school"), are not included in this list; these schools are not certified by NIAD-UE, so they cannot award academic degrees.

English name	Japanese orthography	Pronunciation	abbreviation	Provider	Foundation
Aeronautical Safety College (zh)	航空保安大学校	Kōkū Hoan Daigakkō	ASC	Ministry of Land, Infrastructure and Transport	1959
National Police Academy (Japan)	警察大学校	Keisatsu Daigakkō	NPA; Kei-dai(警大)	National Police Agency	1885
Local Autonomy College	自治大学校	Jichi Daigakkō	LAC	Ministry of Internal Affairs and Communications	1953
Fire and Disaster Management College	消防大学校	Shōbō Daigakkō	FDMC	Fire and Disaster Management Agency(ja)	1959
National Tax College	税務大学校	Zeimu Daigakkō	NTA	National Tax Agency	1964
Social Insurance College	社会保険大学校	Shakai Hoken Daigakkō	SIC	Ministry of Health, Labour and Welfare	1971
College of Land, Infrastructure and Transport	国土交通大学校	Kokudo Kōtsū Daigakkō	CLIT	Ministry of Land, Infrastructure and Transport	2001

=== NGO-administered ===
Postal College runs training courses for the employees of Japan Post.

- Postal College (ja:郵政大学校, Yūsei Daigakkō): Japan Post

=== Independently administered ===
All of the providers of the following daigakkō are Independent Administrative Institutions(IAI).

English name	Japanese orthography	Pronunciation	abbreviation	Provider(IAI)	Foundation
National College of Nursing	国立看護大学校	Kokuritsu Kango Daigakkō	NCN	NCGM (ja) (Note: NCGM means National Center for Global Health and Medicine)	2001
National Fisheries University	水産大学校	Suisan Daigakkō	NFU; Sui-dai-ko(水大校)	National Fisheries University	1885
Polytechnic University (Japan)	職業能力開発総合大学校	Shokugyo Noryoku Kaihatsu Daigakkō	PU	EHRDOJ (ja) (Note: EHRDOJ means Employment and Human Resources Development Organization of Japan)	1961
Marine Technical College	海技大学校	Kaigi Daigakkō	MTC	Marine Technical Education Agency (ja)	2001
Civil Aviation College	航空大学校	Kōkū Daigakkō	CAC	Civil Aviation College	1964
National Farmers Academy	農業者大学校	Nōgyōsha Daigakkō	NFA	NARO (ja) (Note: NARO means National Agriculture and Food Research Organization)	1968
Labour College	労働大学校	Rōdō Daigakkō	LC	JILPT (ja) (Note: JILPT means The Japan Institute for Labour Policy and Training)	2003
SME University	中小企業大学校	Chūshō Kigyō Daigakkō	SMEU	SMRJ (ja) (Note: SMRJ means Organization for Small & Medium Enterprises and Regional Innovation, JAPAN)	2002

=== Before 1947 ===
English name	Japanese orthography	Pronunciation	Provider	Foundation	Abolition
Daigakko	大学校	Daigakkō	Government	1869	1869
Imperial College of Engineering	工部大学校	Kōbu Daigakkō	Ministry of Industry	1877	1886 (Note: Imperial College of Engineering was merged into University of Tokyo in 1886.)
Army War College	陸軍大学校	Rikugun Daigakkō	Imperial Japanese Army	1883	1945
Naval War College	海軍大学校	Kaigun Daigakkō	Imperial Japanese Navy	1888	1945
Japan Women's University	日本女子大学校	Nihon Joshi Daigakkō	Japan Women's University	1901	1948
