= Meteorological College =

Coordinates: 35°51′32.07″N 139°57′30.31″E

- 気象大学校; Kishō Daigakkō
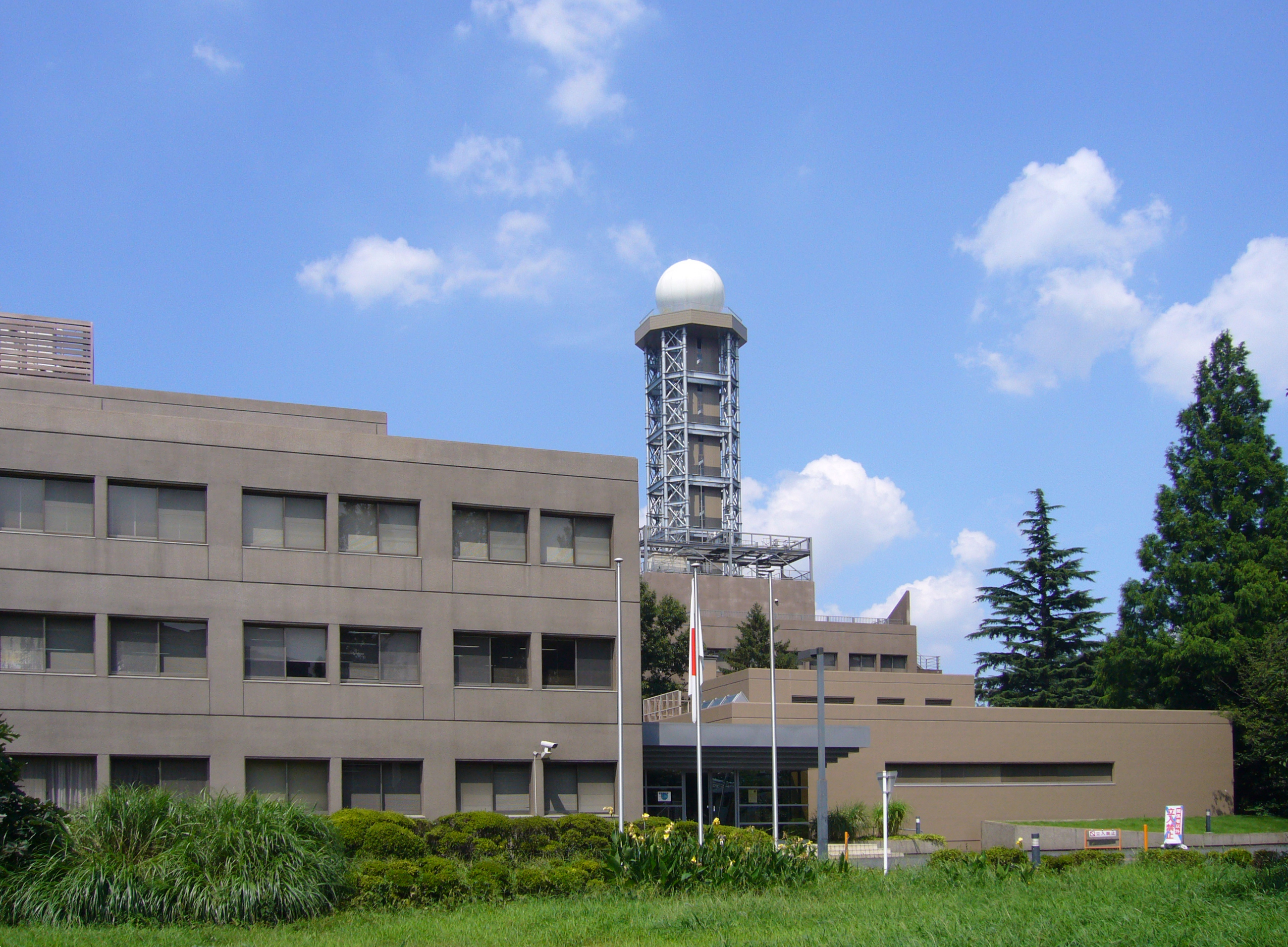
- Type: Daigakkō
- Established: 1922
- Location: Kashiwa, Chiba, Japan
- Website: Official website

Meteorological College (気象大学校, Kishō Daigakkō) is an educational institution affiliated with the Japan Meteorological Agency; its purpose is to train officials of the agency. It is located in Kashiwa, Chiba. The predecessor of the school was founded in 1922, and it was chartered as a four-year college in 1962.
