= 東海大學 =

東海大學 or 東海大学 may refer to:

- Donghae University (Korean: 동해대학교; Hanja: 東海大學校), former name of Hanzhong University in South Korea
- Tokai University (東海大学), a private non-sectarian higher education institution located in Tokyo, Japan
- Tunghai University (Chinese: 東海大學), a private university in Xitun District, Taichung, Taiwan
