= Daxu, Guigang =

Daxu 大圩镇
- Town
- Location in Guangxi
- Coordinates: 23°11′55″N 109°45′30″E
- Country: People's Republic of China
- Autonomous region: Guangxi
- Prefecture-level city: Guigang
- District: Gangbei District
- Time zone: UTC+8 (China Standard)

Daxu (Chinese: 大圩; pinyin: Dàxū) is a town in Gangbei District, Guigang, Guangxi Province, China. As of 2020, it administers one residential community and the following 18 villages:

- Daxu Village
- Xinjian Village (新建村)
- Shanglian Village (上莲村)
- Xunyang Village (寻杨村)
- Minle Village (民乐村)
- Ganling Village (甘岭村)
- Yonglong Village (永隆村)
- Daren Village (大仁村)
- Renxin Village (仁心村)
- Chang'an Village (长安村)
- Shigu Village (石古村)
- Yongfu Village (永福村)
- He Village (何村)
- Jiefang Village (解放村)
- Dongtang Village (东塘村)
- Donghuang Village (东篁村)
- Zhongxi Village (中西村)
- Letang Village (乐堂村)
