= Daxu, Zhejiang =

Daxu 大徐镇
- Town
- Location in Zhejiang
- Coordinates: 29°32′3″N 121°52′47″E
- Country: People's Republic of China
- Province: Zhejiang
- Prefecture-level city: Ningbo
- County: Xiangshan County
- Time zone: UTC+8 (China Standard)

Daxu (Chinese: 大徐; pinyin: Dàxú) is a town in Xiangshan County, Zhejiang Province, China. As of 2020, it administers the following 24 villages:

- Daxu Village
- Jiatiannong Village (甲田弄村)
- Tangjiadian Village (汤家店村)
- Xiangsiling Village (相思岭村)
- Daleitou Village (大磊头村)
- Huangpen'ao Village (黄盆岙村)
- Linshan'ao Village (林善岙村)
- Houlin Village (后林村)
- Zhangjianong Village (章家弄村)
- Yalinxi Village (雅林溪村)
- Xia'ao Village (下岙村)
- Shang'ao Village (上岙村)
- Xinluo'ao Village (新罗岙村)
- Huxiaopu Village (虎啸铺村)
- Xiayu'ao Village (夏雨岙村)
- Likaokeng Village (里考坑村)
- Haikou Village (海口村)
- Sanjiaodi Village (三角地村)
- Andong Village (安东村)
- Tazhuang Village (塔幢村)
- Xiayuan Village (下院村)
- Shanmuyang Village (杉木洋村)
- Chenshan Village (陈山村)
- Tieshi Village (铁拾村)
