= National Defense Medical College =

Coordinates: 35°48′14″N 139°28′03″E

- 防衛医科大学校 Bōei Ika Daigakkō
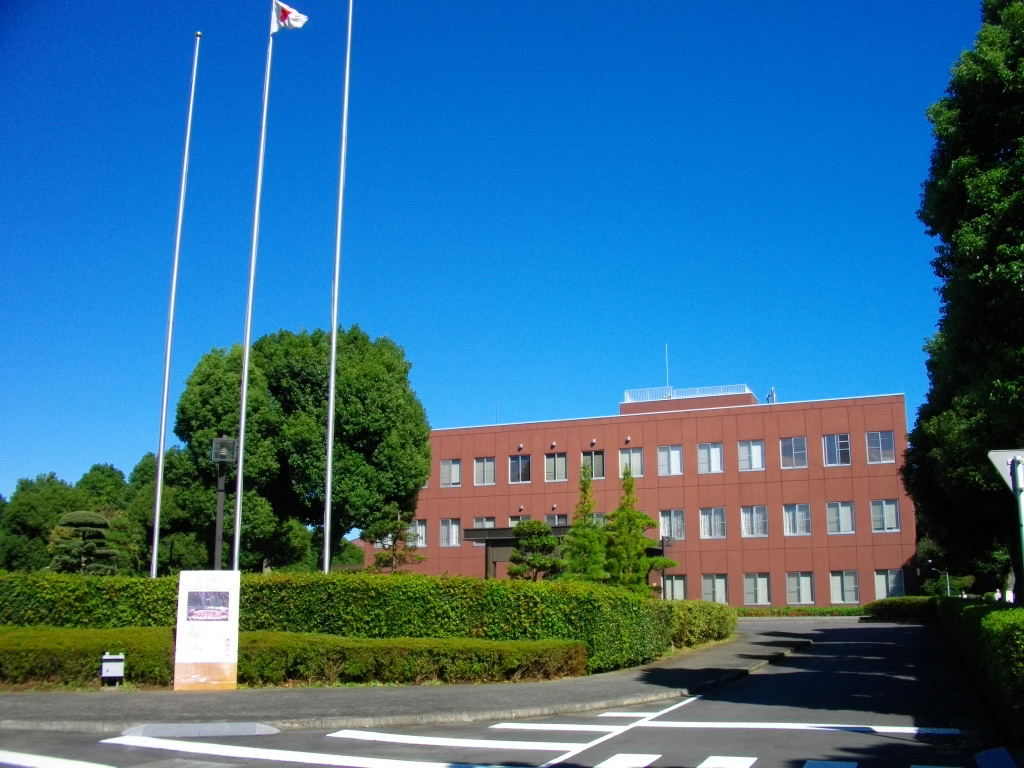
- Type: Military Academy
- Established: 1973
- Affiliations: College Hospital, a Research Institute and a Nursing School,
- Doctoral students: medical doctors
- Location: Tokorozawa, Saitama, Japan
- Website: National Defense Medical College

The National Defense Medical College (防衛医科大学校, Bōei Ika Daigakkō) is Japan's six-year university-level military academy under control of the Ministry of Defense whose objectives are to train future military officers who are also medical doctors and current military doctors. Students graduate with an advanced level of theory and application of medical sciences required to conduct the missions of the Japan Self-Defense Forces and acquisition of research capability of the related fields as well as to offer training of clinical medicine.

== College ==
The National Defense Medical College is headquartered in Tokorozawa, Saitama, and has annexed a College Hospital, a Research Institute and a Nursing School, but no dental school.

Its students are typically selected from recent graduates of Japanese civilian senior high schools who have completed twelve years of formal schooling. Like the National Defense Academy of Japan (NDA) students, they are paid salary and a semiannual bonus as employees of the Ministry of Defense.

After graduation the graduates are posted to an Officer Candidate Training School in one of the three forces. They then take the national medical doctor examination. After passing the examination they take a two-year internship and are posted to Self-Defense Force hospitals and the battalions.

If a graduate quits the force before nine years of service they are required to refund their training cost to the national government. This is different from the NDA.

The National Institution for Academic Degrees and University Evaluation, an independent administrative institution affiliated with the Ministry of Education, Culture, Sports, Science and Technology (MEXT) has accredited the mainstream courses and offers the degrees to the graduates. As the College is not a MEXT-accredited university it cannot offer its own degrees.

== History ==
- 1973: Founded.
- 1974: Matriculated its first student.
- 1985: Matriculated its first female student.
- 1987: Ph.D.-level course starts.
