= Daxu, Jiangsu =

Daxu 大许镇
- Town
- Location in Jiangsu
- Coordinates: 34°17′2″N 117°33′19″E
- Country: People's Republic of China
- Province: Jiangsu
- Prefecture-level city: Xuzhou
- District: Tongshan District
- Time zone: UTC+8 (China Standard)

Daxu (simplified Chinese: 大许; traditional Chinese: 大許; pinyin: Dàxǔ) is a town in Tongshan District, Xuzhou, Jiangsu Province, China. As of 2020, it administers the following 23 villages:

- Daxu Village
- Zhumiao Village (朱庙村)
- Dongtan Village (东探村)
- Xitan Village (西探村)
- Zhuzhuang Village (朱庄村)
- Shaolou Village (邵楼村)
- Yuehai Village (岳海村)
- Liulu Village (刘鹿村)
- Magou Village (麻沟村)
- Tuanbu Village (团埠村)
- Houwang Village (后王村)
- Taishan Village (太山村)
- Jiushan Village (九山村)
- Hexi Village (河西村)
- Banqiao Village (板桥村)
- Hengshan Village (横山村)
- Liyuan Village (梨园村)
- Jiancheng Village (简城村)
- Zhengmiao Village (郑庙村)
- Shazhuang Village (沙庄村)
- Fangting Village (房亭村)
- Dawu Village (大吴村)
- Xiaodun Village (小墩村)
