= National Institution for Academic Degrees and Quality Enhancement of Higher Education =

Government administrative agency in Japan

Coordinates: 35°43′08″N 139°28′29″E

- Abbreviation: NIAD-QE
- Formation: April 1, 2016
- Type: Incorporated Administrative Agency
- Legal status: Active
- Purpose: University Evaluation, Awarding of Academic Degrees
- Headquarters: 1–29-1 Gakuen-nishimachi, Kodaira, Tokyo, Japan
- Region served: Domestic region
- Official language: Japanese; English (secondary)
- President: Hideki Fukuda
- Affiliations: National institution for Academic Degrees and University Evaluation; Center for National University Finance and Management
- Budget: ¥128.191 billion yen
- Staff: 190 full-time (April 2020)
- Website: https://www.niad.ac.jp/english/

The National Institution for Academic Degrees and Quality Enhancement of Higher Education (大学改革支援・学位授与機構, Daigaku Kaikaku Shien • Gakui Juyo Kikō), abbreviated NIAD-QE, is Independent Administrative Institution affiliated with the Ministry of Education, Culture, Sports, Science and Technology (MEXT). Its objectives are: to evaluate education and research activities of Japanese universities and their consortia and to publish the result of the evaluation, and to evaluate achievements of higher education-level learning outside mainstream universities and award academic degrees.

As of July 2007, the second objective consists of:

- Accrediting the courses of some daigakkō and awarding academic degrees to the graduates
- Awarding bachelor's degrees to the graduates of Japanese junior colleges and kōsen (technical colleges) who did recognisable extra studies.

It is headquartered in Kodaira, Tokyo.

== History ==
- 1991: The Study Centre for Academic Degree Awarding and Committee for Study for Creation of Academic Degree Awarding Institution was established in the Graduate University for Advanced Studies.
- 1992: The NIAD was established.
- 1994: The NIAD was expanded to NIAD-UE.
- 2002: The first publication of the results of evaluation.
- 2003: Relocated to the current campus in Kodaira.
- 2016: The NIAD-QE was established.

== See also ==
- List of Independent Administrative Institutions (Japan)
