= Penal system of Japan =

Penal system of the State of Japan

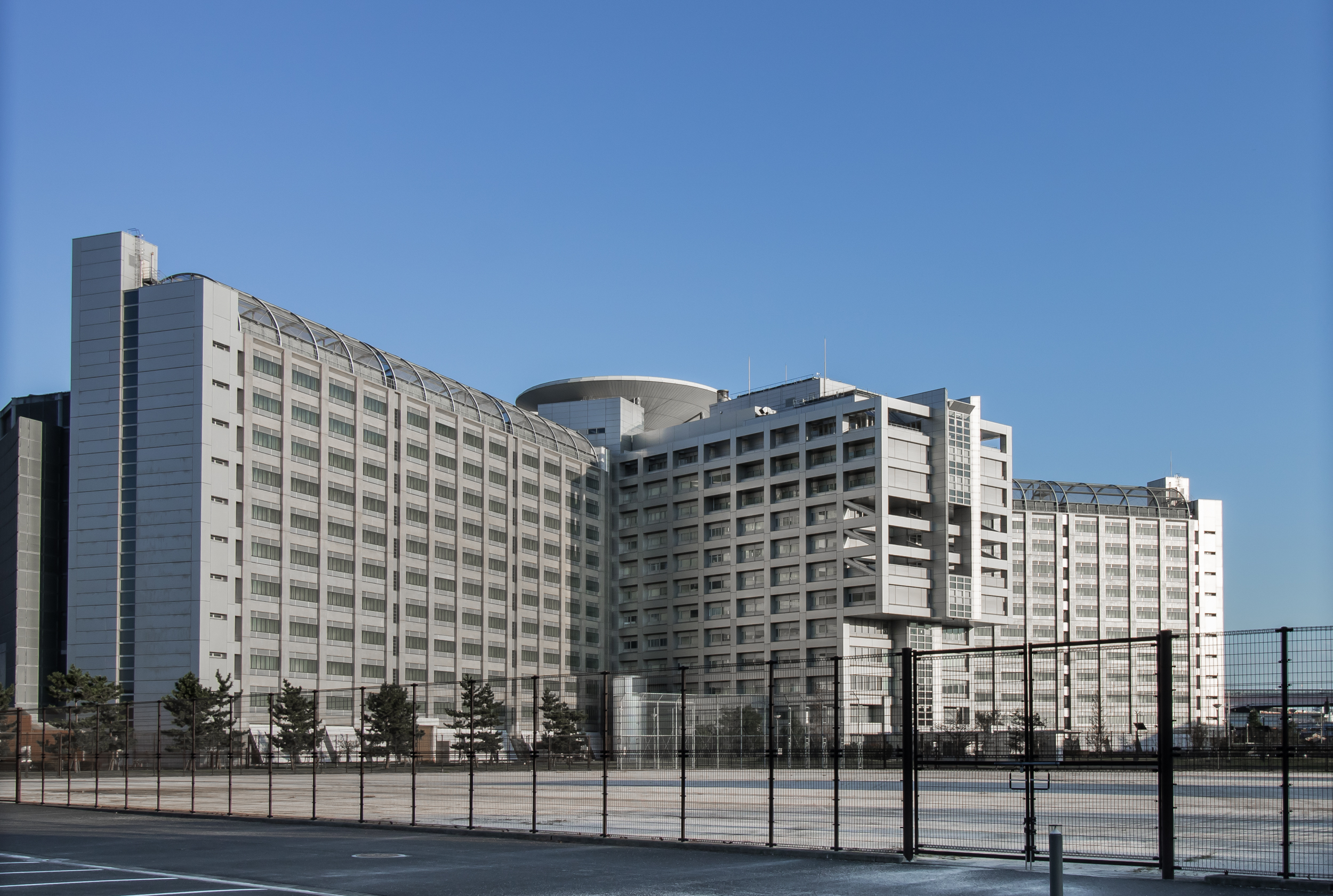
Tokyo Detention House in Katsushika, Tokyo

The penal system of Japan (including prisons) is part of the criminal justice system of Japan. It is intended to resocialize, reform, rehabilitate and punish offenders. The penal system is operated by the Correction Bureau of the Ministry of Justice.

== Procedure ==
On confinement, prisoners are first classified according to gender, nationality, type of penalty, length of sentence, degree of criminality, and state of physical and mental health. They are then placed in special programs designed to treat their individual needs.

== Education ==
Prison education in Japan can be traced back to at least 1871, when practical ethics lectures were introduced into a prison in Tokyo. Reading and writing classes began being implemented into the prison system on a larger scale by 1881. By the late 1880s, it was believed that ethics classes were the most important form of education for prisoners, and by the 1890s, education was considered one of the most important issues of the prison system. Conferences, mostly attended by prison staff, were held in 1889 and 1892 to discuss ways to improve education within the prison system. There was no unanimous agreement on the best way to implement moral education for prisoners, and different institutions began running their own individual programs. In 1910, prison law in Japan ordered education be given to all juvenile inmates, and to any adult inmate deemed to have a need. Regulations stipulated two to four hours per day be set aside for education. In 1952, correspondence courses were introduced into all prisons, and in 1955, a high school was established at Matsumoto juvenile prison for juvenile inmates who had not completed their compulsory education. As of 2018, male prisoners nationwide can still be transferred on request to the school. There were six graduates in 2002, and three in 2018.

== Administration ==
The Correctional Bureau of the Ministry of Justice administers the adult prison system as well as the juvenile correctional system and three women's guidance homes (to rehabilitate sex workers). The ministry's Rehabilitation Bureau operates the probation and parole systems. Prison personnel are trained at an institute in Tokyo and in branch training institutes in each of the eight regional correctional headquarters under the Correctional Bureau. Professional probation officers study at the Legal Training and Research Institute of the Ministry. The prison guards in Japan do not carry firearms but can activate an alarm where specialized armed guards will come. There can be as low as one prison guard supervising 40 inmates while they are working.

== Prison population ==
In 1990, Japan's prison population stood at somewhat less than 47,000; nearly 7,000 were in short-term detention centers, and the remaining 40,000 were in prisons. Approximately 46% were repeat offenders. Japanese recidivism was attributed mainly to the discretionary powers of police, prosecutors, and courts and to the tendency to seek alternative sentences for first offenders. By 2001, the overall prison population rose to 61,242 or 48 prisoners per 100,000. By the end of 2009, the prison population had yet again risen to 75,250, or 59 prisoners per 100,000. One reason for the rise is a large increase in the number of elderly being convicted of crimes, with loneliness being cited as a major factor.

== Juvenile offenders ==
Although a few juvenile offenders are handled under the general penal system, most are treated in separate juvenile training schools. More lenient than the penal institutions, these facilities provide correctional education and regular schooling for delinquents under the age of twenty. More adults are in prison than child delinquents, mainly because of the low crime rate.

In Japan, juvenile prisoners are defined as people less than 20 years of age. All juvenile cases are first sent to a family court, where the judge may decide that the juvenile be tried by the ordinary court (as an adult). Juveniles not tried by an ordinary court are detained in juvenile training schools (typical juvenile correctional institutions); these prisoners represented 2,872 at the end of 2014. The 52 Juvenile institutions are under the responsibility of the prison administration. Minors under 18 years of age cannot be sentenced to the death penalty. Juvenile prisoners make up 4.5% of the prison population.

== Aftercare treatment ==
According to the Ministry of Justice, the government's responsibility for social order does not end with imprisoning an offender, but also extends to aftercare treatment and to noninstitutional treatment to substitute for or supplement prison terms.

A large number of those given suspended sentences are released to the supervision of volunteer officers under the guidance of professional probation officers. Adults are usually placed on probation for a fixed period, and juveniles are placed on probation until they reach the age of twenty.

== Foreign inmates ==
The number of crimes committed by foreigners significantly decreased in recent years from 43,622 in 2005 to 15,276 in 2016. Most common offenses committed by foreigners were theft (60% of their Penal Code offenses), immigration violations (66% of non-Penal code offenses), and drug offenses in 2016.

The number of convicted foreign prisoners was 3,509 in 2016. Yet, most of them were given suspended sentences and only 744 were imprisoned in the same year. The largest group was thieves (122 people) and the second largest was drug offenders (96 people).

== Use of volunteers ==
Volunteers are also used in supervising parolees, although professional probation officers generally supervise offenders considered to have a high risk of recidivism. Volunteers hail from all walks of life and handle no more than five cases at one time. They are responsible for overseeing the offenders' conduct to prevent the occurrence of further offenses. Volunteer probation officers also offer guidance and assistance to the ex-convict in assuming a law-abiding place in the community.

Although volunteers are sometimes criticized for being too old compared with their charges (more than 70 percent are retired and are age fifty-five or over) and thus unable to understand the problems their charges faced, most authorities believe that the volunteers are critically important in the nation's criminal justice system.

== Convict labour ==
Assigned labour is considered a priority in Japan's correctional system. By law, if a prisoner refuses work or neglects their labour responsibility, punishment is to be implemented. Work hours consist of eight hours each day over the Monday-Friday period and four hours on Saturdays—although individual cases may extend or limit these procedures. In most prisons, inmates who perform paid work are paid for their activity. The money earned by inmates through prison labour in Japan is not "owned" by the inmate until they are released from incarceration. Instead, income is placed into a specialised bank account with only a small amount being available for prisoner use to purchase essential items from the prison store. Permission may also be granted for inmates to use this saved amount toward fines, lawsuit fees and alimony.

Depending on an inmate's classification, occupational training is also a feature of Japan's correctional system. Intended to prepare prisoners for their release into society, prison institutions may offer training in dry cleaning, automobile repairs, photo typography, carpentry and leatherwork. These opportunities are based on prisoner requests and may or may not be accepted by prison authorities. Prisoners in Japan are also able to undertake factory work (e.g., assembling machinery, fabricating parts) for external manufacturers through contracted arrangements. As opposed to offshoring labour to China-based factories, manufacturers subcontract their factory work to prisons to save shipping and production costs.

Former US Marine Rodrico Harp, who was sentenced to seven years hard labor for his part in the infamous 1995 Okinawa rape incident, served his sentence at Kurihama prison near Yokosuka, and described fabricating car parts for Mazda and Nissan for a salary of less than $30 a month during his incarceration in an interview with Stars and Stripes after his release.

International criminal defense lawyer Michael Griffith is a well known critic of the practice, saying: "They don't have to recruit these workers. They don't have to insure them, or give them sick pay, or fulfil any of the obligations that they would in a regular factory. They know that their workers can never complain, or join a trade union, or get headaches, or take time off. Why should these companies get the benefit of convict labour? It is sheer, naked exploitation, and it is a disgrace in any country that calls itself a civilised democracy."

In June 1994, Griffith made submissions to the Committee on Foreign Affairs of the House of Representatives along with his client Christopher Lavinger, who previously served 16 months in Fuchū Prison for drug possession. Lavinger described to the Committee his experiences of making an array of commercial products in the prison factory, including electronic components for SEGA, for a salary of less than twenty cents an hour. Thomas Klitgaard, senior vice president and general counsel of SEGA USA, later stated that one of 300 subcontractors retained by SEGA Japan had used prison labor to assemble nine pin connector plugs for some SEGA games, but that the practice had subsequently been detected and stopped.

== Claims of inmate rights abuses ==
Amnesty International has cited Japan for abuse of inmates by guards for infractions of prison rules. This abuse is in the form of beatings, solitary confinement, overcrowding, or "minor solitary confinement" (keiheikin), which forces inmates to be interned in tiny cells kneeling or crossed legged, and restrained with handcuffs for prolonged periods of time.

In 2003, Justice Ministry formed a special team to investigate 1,566 prisoner deaths from 1993 to 2002. A preliminary report suggested that nearly one-third of the cases involved suspicious circumstances. However, in June, the Ministry announced that there was evidence of abuse only in the two Nagoya fatalities. Regarding the other suspicious deaths, the Ministry said that approximately 10 deaths could be attributed to poor medical care. The authorities reported they had lost the documentation on nine deaths in Tokyo's Fuchu Prison. The remaining deaths were determined to be "not suspicious."

In the wake of prison abuses, the "Law Concerning Penal Institutions and the Treatment of Sentenced Inmates" came into effect on June 7, 2007, to reform treatment on prisoners, such as "the expansion of prisoners' contacts with the outside world, the establishment of independent committees to inspect prisons, and the improvement of the complaints mechanisms." However, the Japan Federation of Bar Associations (JFBA) expressed concerns in 2010 about revalidating unlimited solitary confinements (along with newer types of handcuffs for such inmates), not providing medical care for inmates under the jurisdiction of the Ministry of Health, Labour, and Welfare, and mental and physical effects of confinement for death row inmates.

In the article " 'Prison Libraries' in Japan: The Current Situation of Access to Books and Reading in Correctional Institutions" Kenichi Nakane talks about another form of prisoner neglect/abuse. Nakane's article finds that there is a severe lack of reading materials available to people who are incarcerated in Japanese correctional facilities. The author Kenichi Nakane uses the term "prison library" because there are no professionally run libraries inside of any of the correctional facilities. Nakane finds that incarcerated persons can only get books, newspapers, and magazines by buying them and/or getting them as gifts. Nakane found that occasionally a limited number of reading materials are supplied, but they are out dated and inadequate. Nakane also finds the lack of reading material and availability of information in these incarceration facilities to be hindering some of the rights of the incarcerated individuals. To further investigate this problem, Kenichi Nakane traveled to twenty-six prisons in America and seven prisons in the United Kingdom and found that the availability of books, and information to incarcerated individuals in Japan was very limited compared to US and UK prisons.

== Penal institutions ==
Japanese "penal institutions" include prisons for sentenced adults, juvenile detention centers for sentenced juveniles, and detention houses for pre-trial inmates.

In Japan, there are 62 prisons, 7 juvenile prisons, 52 juvenile classification homes, 52 juvenile training schools, 10 Detention Houses, 8 regional parole boards, and 50 probation offices.

=== Prisons ===
Different types of prisoners are sent to different prisons. For example, the Fuchu Prison (Tokyo) and Yokohama Prison (Kanagawa) receive inmates that have advanced criminal inclination with sentences shorter than 10 years – e.g., prisoners affiliated with crime organizations. The Chiba Prison received inmates without advanced criminal inclination and who do not have sentences longer than 10 years – e.g., murder without the possibility of repeating a crime again. Ichihara Prison (Chiba) is specialized for traffic offenders – e.g., repetitive offenders and those who killed others while driving.

==== Sapporo Correctional Precinct ====
- Sapporo Prison 札幌刑務所 – Higashi-ku, Sapporo
  - Sapporo Prison Sapporo Branch 札幌刑務所札幌刑務支所 – Higashi-ku, Sapporo
- Asahikawa Prison 旭川刑務所 – Asahikawa, Hokkaidō
- Obihiro Prison 帯広刑務所 – Obihiro, Hokkaidō
  - Obihiro Prison Kushiro Branch 帯広刑務所釧路刑務支所 – Kushiro, Hokkaidō
- Abashiri Prison 網走刑務所 – Abashiri, Hokkaidō (with Abashiri Prison museum)
- Tsukigata Prison 月形刑務所 – Tsukigata, Hokkaidō
- Hakodate Juvenile Prison 函館少年刑務所 – Hakodate, Hokkaidō

==== Sendai Correctional Precinct ====
- Aomori Prison 青森刑務所 – Aomori, Aomori
- Miyagi Prison 宮城刑務所 – Wakabayashi-ku, Sendai
- Akita Prison 秋田刑務所 – Akita City
- Yamagata Prison 山形刑務所 – Yamagata, Yamagata
- Fukushima Prison 福島刑務所 – Fukushima, Fukushima
  - Fukushima Prison Fukushima Branch 福島刑務所福島刑務支所 – Morioka, Iwate
- Morioka Juvenile Prison 盛岡少年刑務所 – Morioka, Iwate

==== Tokyo Correctional Precinct ====
- Mito Prison 水戸刑務所 – Hitachinaka, Ibaraki
- Tochigi Prison 栃木刑務所 – Tochigi, Tochigi
- Kurobane Prison 黒羽刑務所 – Ōtawara, Tochigi
- Maebashi Prison 前橋刑務所 – Maebashi, Gunma
- Chiba Prison 千葉刑務所 – Wakaba-ku, Chiba
- Ichihara Prison 市原刑務所 – Ichihara, Chiba
- Fuchu Prison 府中刑務所 – Fuchū, Tokyo
- Yokohama Prison 横浜刑務所 – Kōnan-ku, Yokohama
  - Yokohama Prison Yokosuka Branch 横浜刑務所横須賀刑務支所 – Yokosuka, Kanagawa
- Niigata Prison 新潟刑務所 – Kōnan-ku, Niigata
- Kofu Prison 甲府刑務所 – Kōfu, Yamanashi
- Nagano Prison 長野刑務所 – Suzaka, Nagano
- Shizuoka Prison 静岡刑務所 – Aoi-ku, Shizuoka
- Kawagoe Juvenile Prison 川越少年刑務所 – Kawagoe, Saitama
- Matsumoto Juvenile Prison 松本少年刑務所 – Matsumoto, Nagano

==== Nagoya Correctional Precinct ====
- Toyama Prison 富山刑務所 – Toyama City
- Kanazawa Prison 金沢刑務所 – Kanazawa, Ishikawa
- Fukui Prison 福井刑務所 – Fukui, Fukui
- Gifu Prison 岐阜刑務所 – Gifu, Gifu
- Kasamatsu Prison 笠松刑務所 – Kasamatsu, Gifu
- Nagoya Prison 名古屋刑務所 – Miyoshi, Aichi
  - Nagoya Prison Toyohashi Branch 名古屋刑務所豊橋刑務支所 – Toyohashi, Aichi
- Mie Prison 三重刑務所 – Tsu, Mie

==== Osaka Correctional Precinct ====
- Shiga Prison 滋賀刑務所 – Ōtsu, Shiga
- Kyoto Prison 京都刑務所 – Yamashina-ku, Kyoto
- Osaka Prison 大阪刑務所 – Sakai-ku, Sakai
- Kobe Prison 神戸刑務所 – Akashi, Hyōgo
- Kakogawa Prison 加古川刑務所 – Kakogawa, Hyōgo
- Wakayama Prison 和歌山刑務所 – Wakayama, Wakayama
- Himeji Prison 姫路少年刑務所 – Himeji, Hyōgo
- Nara Juvenile Prison 奈良少年刑務所 – Nara, Nara

==== Hiroshima Correctional Precinct ====
- Tottori Prison 鳥取刑務所 – Tottori, Tottori
- Matsue Prison 松江刑務所 – Matsue, Shimane
- Okayama Prison 岡山刑務所 – Kita-ku, Okayama
- Hiroshima Prison 広島刑務所 – Naka-ku, Hiroshima
  - Hiroshima Prison Onomichi Branch 広島刑務所尾道刑務支所 – Onomichi, Hiroshima
- Yamaguchi Prison 山口刑務所 – Yamaguchi, Yamaguchi
- Iwakuni Prison 岩国刑務所 – Iwakuni, Yamaguchi

==== Takamatsu Correctional Precinct ====
- Tokushima Prison 徳島刑務所 – Tokushima, Tokushima
- Takamatsu Prison 高松刑務所 – Takamatsu, Kagawa
- Matsuyama Prison 松山刑務所 – Tōon, Ehime
  - Matsuyama Prison Saijo Branch 松山刑務所西条刑務支所 – Saijō, Ehime
- Kochi Prison 高知刑務所 – Kōchi, Kōchi

==== Fukuoka Correctional Precinct ====
- Fukuoka Prison 福岡刑務所 – Umi, Fukuoka
- Fumoto Prison 麓刑務所 – Tosu, Saga
- Sasebo Prison 佐世保刑務所 – Sasebo, Nagasaki
- Nagasaki Prison 長崎刑務所 – Isahaya, Nagasaki
- Kumamoto Prison 熊本刑務所 – Kumamoto, Kumamoto
- Oita Prison 大分刑務所 – Ōita, Ōita
- Miyazaki Prison 宮崎刑務所 – Miyazaki, Miyazaki
- Kagoshima Prison 鹿児島刑務所 – Yūsui, Kagoshima
- Okinawa Prison 沖縄刑務所 – Nanjō, Okinawa
  - Okinawa Prison Yaeyama Branch 沖縄刑務所八重山刑務支所 – Ishigaki, Okinawa
- Saga Juvenile Prison 佐賀少年刑務所 – Saga, Saga

=== Detention houses ===
- Tokyo Detention House
- Tachikawa Detention House
- Nagoya Detention House
- Kyoto Detention House
- Osaka Detention House
- Kobe Detention House
- Hiroshima Detention House
- Fukuoka Detention House
- Sendai Detention House
- Sapporo Detention House

=== Medical facilities ===
- Hachiojo medical prison 八王子医療刑務所 – Hachiōji, Tokyo
- Kitakyushu medical prison 北九州医療刑務所 – Kokuraminami-ku, Kitakyūshū (mental illness)
  - An inmate died in 1992 at Jono after an assault by a prison officer.
- Kikuchi medical branch prison (leprosy)
- Okazaki medical prison 岡崎医療刑務所 – Okazaki, Aichi (mental illness)
- Osaka medical branch prison 大阪医療刑務所 – Sakai-ku, Sakai

=== Private Finance Initiative ===
Private Finance Initiative (PFI) prisons are maintained with private management. PFI prisons, which are for sentenced inmates with low criminal tendencies, include:

- Harima Rehabilitation Program Center (播磨社会復帰促進センター) – Kakogawa, Hyogo – Houses men
- Kitsuregawa Rehabilitation Program Center (喜連川社会復帰促進センター) – Sakura, Tochigi – Houses men
- Mine Rehabilitation Program Center (美祢社会復帰促進センター) – Mine, Yamaguchi – Houses men and women
- Shimane Asahi Rehabilitation Program Center (島根あさひ社会復帰促進センター) – Hamada, Shimane – Houses men

The inmates population tends to be large: 2,000 at Kizuregawa and Shimane Asahi; 1,000 at Harima and 500 at Miya. Under the PFI, prison facilities were built by the state but the operation and maintenance are made by private companies. Inmates at the private prisons are without advanced criminal inclinations.

== Logo ==
The logo of the Correction Bureau includes three "C"s. One stands for Challenge, one for Change, and one for Cooperate.
