= Daxu, Anhui =

Daxu 大圩镇
- Town
- Location in China
- Coordinates: 31°46′55″N 117°21′57″E
- Country: People's Republic of China
- Province: Anhui
- Prefecture-level city: Hefei
- District: Baohe District
- Time zone: UTC+8 (China Standard)

Daxu (Chinese: 大圩; pinyin: Dàxū) is a town in Baohe District, Hefei, Anhui Province, China. As of 2020, it administers the following 15 villages:

- Nandou Village (南斗村)
- Xiaonan Village (晓南村)
- Xuxi Village (圩西村)
- Shenfu Village (沈福村)
- Xiaoxing Village (晓星村)
- Xuetang Village (学塘村)
- Xugui Village (许贵村)
- Donglin Village (东林村)
- Xinmin Village (新民村)
- Ciyun Village (慈云村)
- Yudun Village (余墩村)
- Huanggang Village (黄港村)
- Yinghe Village (迎河村)
- Motan Village (磨滩村)
- Xinhe Village (新河村)
