= Daxu, Hunan =

Daxu 大圩镇
- Town
- Location in Hunan
- Coordinates: 24°52′8″N 111°42′3″E
- Country: People's Republic of China
- Province: Hunan
- Prefecture-level city: Yongzhou
- Autonomous county: Jianghua Yao Autonomous County
- Time zone: UTC+8 (China Standard)

Daxu (Chinese: 大圩; pinyin: Dàxū) is a town in Jianghua Yao Autonomous County, Hunan Province, China. As of 2020, it administers one residential community and the following 29 villages:

- Wenhai Village (文海村)
- Niejia Village (聂家村)
- Yuantou Village (源头村)
- Goubian Village (沟边村)
- Dabuwan Village (大布湾村)
- Huangting Village (黄庭村)
- Muyuanjing Village (木园景村)
- Baojing Village (宝镜村)
- Shuli Village (书里村)
- Lianhua Village (莲花村)
- Liangyuan Village (良缘村)
- Xiling Village (西岭村)
- Da Village (大村)
- Xingren Village (兴仁村)
- Wenming Village (文明村)
- Heping Village (和平村)
- Juntian Village (军田村)
- Datang Village (大塘村)
- Gaozhai Village (高寨村)
- Caohuang Village (草皇村)
- Xinhe Village (心合村)
- Liangchahe Village (两岔河村)
- Dongchonghe Village (东冲河村)
- Zhuangjia Village (庄稼村)
- Jingbianying Village (靖边营村)
- Hengjiang Village (横江村)
- Longmen Village (龙门村)
- Zhulin Village (竹林村)
- Changshan Village (长山村)
