= Ministry of Justice (Japan) =

Government ministry of Japan

Coordinates: 35.67635°N 139.753304°E

- 法務省; Hōmu-shō

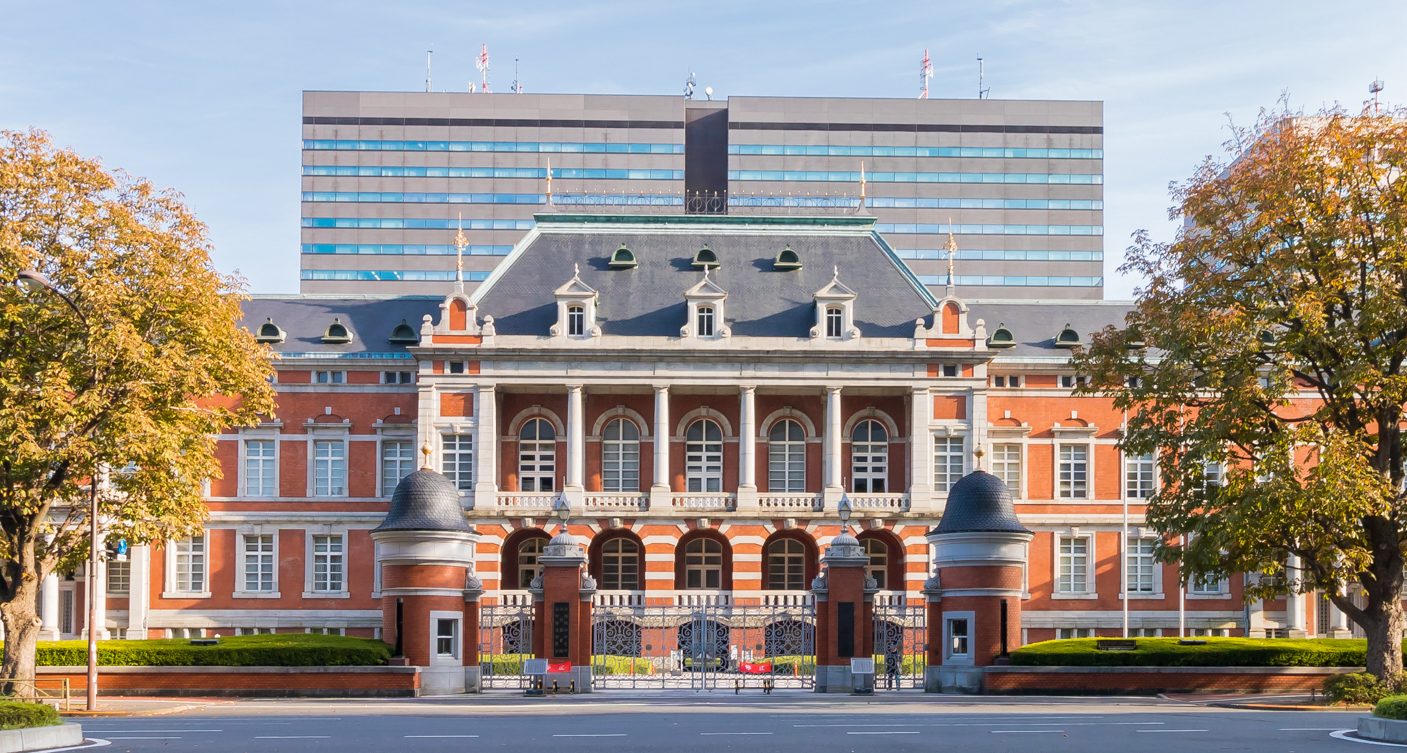
- The Ministry of Justice building in Kasumigaseki

Agency overview
- Formed: February 15, 1948
- Preceding agency: Ministry of Justice (司法省, Shihōshō) (July 9, 1871 – February 15, 1948)
- Jurisdiction: Government of Japan
- Headquarters: 1-1-1 Kasumigaseki, Chiyoda-ku, Tokyo, Japan
- Minister responsible: Takashi Yamashita, Minister of Justice
- Deputy Minister responsible: Kotetsu Kadoyama
- Agency executives: Ryuji Kawahara, Undersecretary; Hideyuki Nakano, State Minister
- Child agencies: Public Prosecutors Office; Public Security Intelligence Agency; Immigration Services Agency
- Website: https://www.moj.go.jp/EN/index.html

The Ministry of Justice (法務省, Hōmu-shō) is one of the cabinet level ministries of the Japanese government. It is responsible for the judicial system, correctional services, and household, property and corporate registrations, and immigration control. It also serves as the government's legal representatives. The MOJ represents the Japanese government in litigation, and is also responsible for maintaining the official registers of households, resident aliens, real estate and corporations.

At the top of the ministry is the Minister of Justice, a member of the Cabinet, who is chosen by the Prime Minister from among members of the National Diet.

== History ==
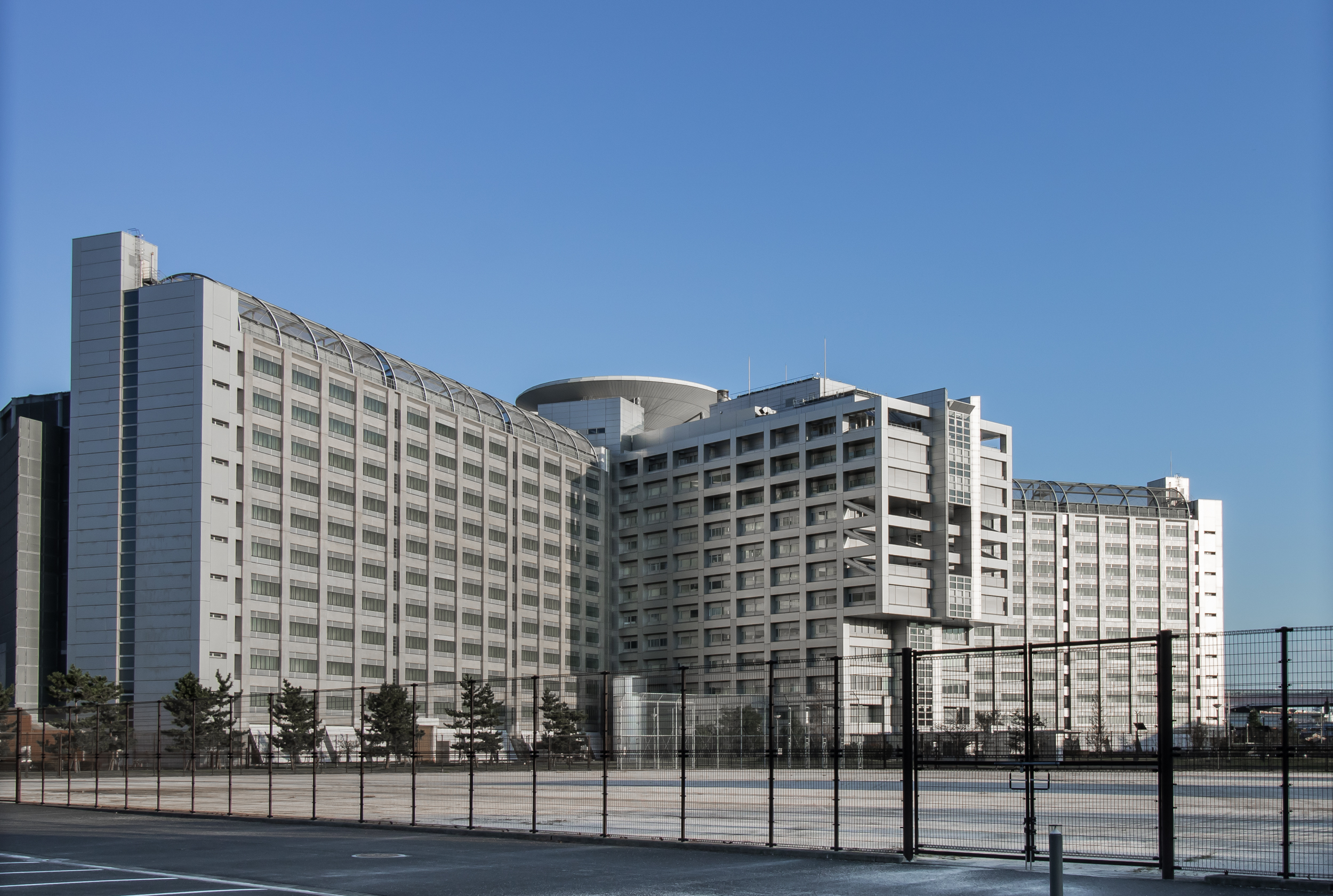
Tokyo Detention House

The Ministry of Justice was established in 1871 as the Ministry of Justice (司法省, Shihōshō). On February 15, 1948, the Attorney General's Office Establishment Law led to the creation of the Attorney General's Office (法務庁, Hōmu-chō). The ministry acquired its present name under the post-war Constitution of Japan in 1952.

Under the Central Government Reorganization Plan, the Litigation Bureau was disbanded on January 6, 2001. The LB was reestablished on April 10, 2015 from the Litigation Department.

== Structure ==
The Ministry of Justice is organized in seven bureaus:

- Minister's Secretariat
- The Civil Affairs Bureau
- Criminal Affairs Bureau
- Correction Bureau
- Rehabilitation Bureau
- Human Rights Bureau
- Litigation Bureau

The MOJ has jurisdiction over the National Bar Examination Commission, the Public Security Examination Commission, and the Public Security Intelligence Agency. Although the Public Prosecutors Office are administratively part of the Ministry of Justice, they are independent of the authority of the Minister of Justice.

The MOJ also oversees the Immigration Services Agency.

== See also ==
- Penal system of Japan
