= Kawasaki stabbings =

Mass stabbing in Kawasaki, Japan

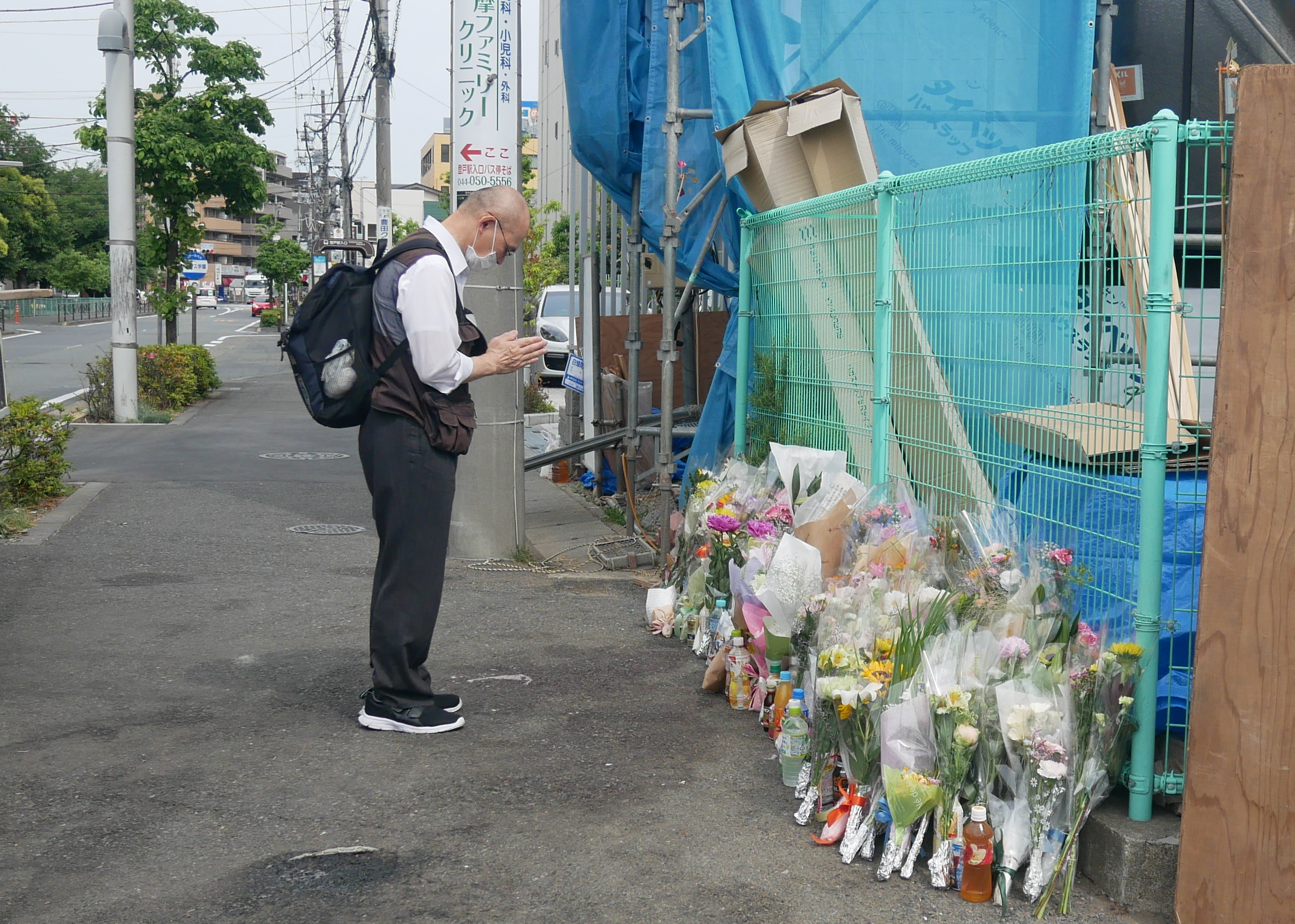
- Makeshift memorial for the victims

- Kawasaki stabbings (Kanagawa Prefecture) Kawasaki stabbings (Japan) Location of the Kawasaki stabbings within Kanagawa Prefecture
- Location: 35°37′19.8″N 139°33′57.7″E; Kawasaki, Kanagawa Prefecture, Japan
- Date: 28 May 2019; 7:44 a.m. (JST)
- Attack type: Mass stabbing, double-murder, murder-suicide, pedicide
- Weapons: Two Yanagi ba; All-purpose knife (Unused); Sashimi bōchō (Unused)
- Deaths: 3 (including the perpetrator)
- Injuries: 18
- Perpetrator: Ryuichi Iwasaki

The Kawasaki stabbings (川崎殺傷事件, Kawasaki Sasshō Jiken) occurred on the morning of 28 May 2019 in the Tama ward of Kawasaki City, Kanagawa Prefecture, Japan, four blocks west of Noborito Station. Two people were murdered, and 18 others were injured after being stabbed at a city bus stop by 51-year-old Ryuichi Iwasaki (岩崎隆一 Iwasaki Ryūichi). After carrying out the attack, Iwasaki committed suicide by stabbing himself in the neck.

== Incident ==
Kawasaki city fire department said it received an emergency call at 7:44 a.m. JST, and responded to an incident in which a man attacked students waiting at a bus stop with Yanagiba, long and thin knives used in Japanese cuisine to prepare sashimi and nigiri sushi, in both hands. The students targeted were identified by the NHK public broadcaster as all being girls. A bus driver who witnessed the attack claimed that they saw the man holding two knives and he had walked towards the bus before stabbing the children. Authorities told reporters the man attacked people randomly as they lined up to enter the bus.

The Kawasaki Fire Department reported that sixteen elementary school students from Caritas Elementary School, a private Catholic school, and three adults were injured in the attack, separately from the suspect.

== Perpetrator ==
Ryuichi Iwasaki (岩崎 隆一, Iwasaki Ryūichi), a 51-year-old man suspected of carrying out the attack was born in December 1967 and was believed to be a resident of Kawasaki's Asao ward. He was found lying on the ground of the scene, bleeding from a self-inflicted stab wound to the neck. The two 30 centimetres (12 in) bloodied sashimi knives were found nearby, and two more knives, a 25 centimetres (9.8 in) all-purpose knife and a 20 centimetres (7.9 in) sashimi bōchō were found in a backpack that had been in his possession and dropped at a nearby FamilyMart. The suspect was transported to a local hospital, where he was pronounced dead.

Iwasaki was an unemployed hikikomori, which is someone who takes withdrawing from society to an extreme. He was living in his elderly uncle's home. Before the incident, he had a dispute with his neighbors but would not talk with his uncle about what had happened.

== Victims ==
The deceased were identified as Hanako Kuribayashi (栗林 華子, Kuribayashi Hanako), an 11-year-old student, and Satoshi Oyama (小山 智史, Oyama Satoshi), a 39-year-old Foreign Ministry employee who worked primarily as a diplomat to Myanmar.

They were declared dead at Musashi Kosugi Hospital. Some survivors were also treated at this hospital, as well at St. Marianna University School of Medicine, Kawasaki Municipal Tama Hospital, and Shin-Yurigaoka General Hospital.

== Related incidents ==
Several days after the incident, former MAFF Vice Minister Hideaki Kumazawa killed his hikikomori son, Eiichiro, fearing that he would commit similar crimes to those of which Iwasaki committed, as he had been violent towards his family members as well as being described as reclusive. Kumazawa was sentenced to 6 years in prison in 2021.

== See also ==
- Etajima stabbings
- Ikeda school massacre
- Shimonoseki Station massacre
