= Yanagi ba =

Japanese knife for preparing sushi and sashimi

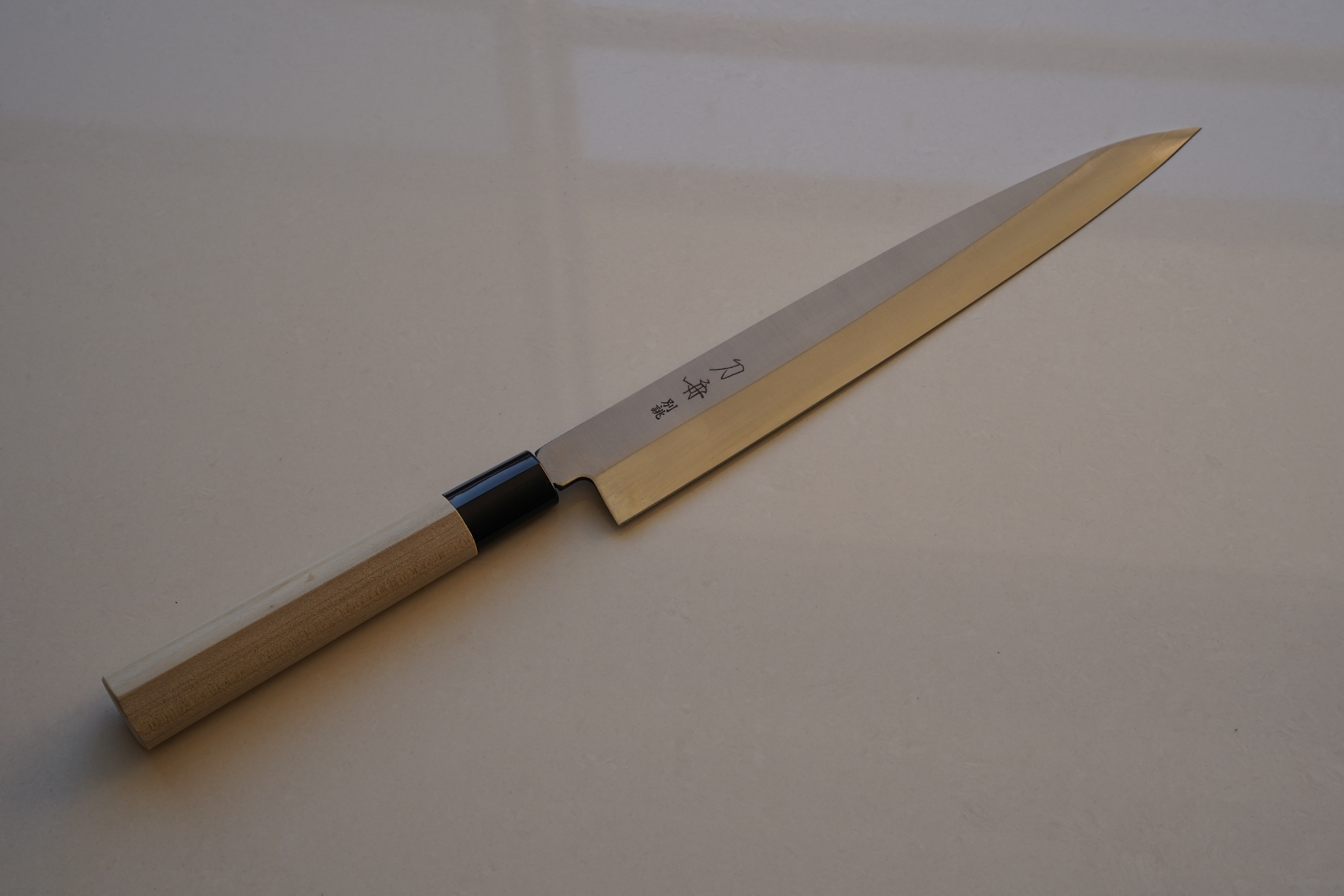
Yanagi-ba (front face)

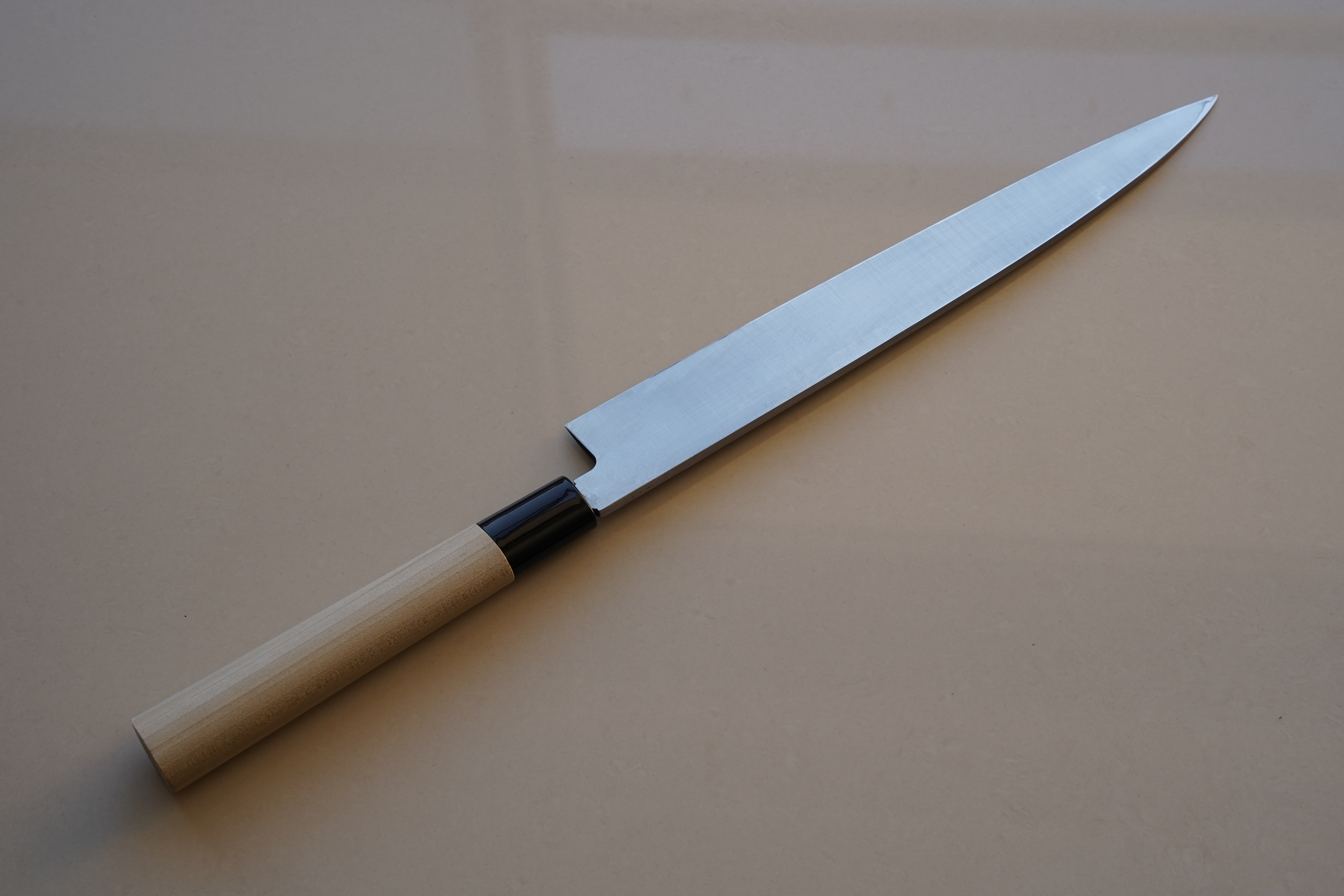
Yanagiba (back face)

Yanagi-ba bōchō — 柳刃包丁 — "willow blade knife" or simply yanagi, is a long and thin knife used in washoku — 和食 — "Japanese cuisine". It is the typical example of the shobu-bōchō or sashimi bōchō — 刺身包丁 — "raw fish knife" used to slice fish for sashimi and nigirizushi.

The yanagi-ba can start at 20 centimetres (8 inches). In general, the blade size is between 25 cm (10 in) and 30 cm (12 in), with rare very large blades being as long as 36 cm (14 in).

Generally, the yanagi-ba is considered one of a trio single-bevelled Japanese kitchen knives forming an essential basic range:

- deba − a broad and short fish preparation knife
- usuba bōchō − a wide vegetable chopper − or else a double-bevelled nakiri bōchō
- yanagi-ba − a long and thin fish slicer (for sashimi) − or else a double-bevelled suji-hiki

== Construction ==
(a) Kataba edge for right-hand use – (b) ryōba double bevel edge for use in either hand – (c) kataba edge for left-hand use. (The sample knife is a deba bōchō)

When preparing sashimi and nigirizushi, the goal is usually to have cut surfaces that are even, smooth, and shiny in order to appeal to the eye and maximize the taste. The construction of a yanagi-ba is designed for this purpose.

- Length − The long blade allows the user to cut a block of flesh in a single stroke. This prevents zigzag cutting, which creates a serrated cross section.
- Thinness − The blade is very thin behind the edge which allows the cut to be made using primarily the weight of the knife. Greater force or thickness would result in tearing or bruising of the flesh.
- Single bevel edge − For right-hand use, the yanagi-ba has a grind on the right side and is hollow on the left. This allows a more acute angle compared to most double-bevelled knives. It also gives a non-stick quality to the blade. The back face (urasuki) is hollow or concave to easily detach the blade from the substance being cut, and the front bevel (shinogi) allows the sliced piece to be easily removed from the blade after cutting. For left-handed people, knives with a reversed bevel are available in more limited numbers from specialist kitchenware shops and suppliers.
- Steel properties − The yanagi-ba is crafted using techniques from those of the Japanese swordsmithing adapted to modern requirements. The blade is constructed from soft iron, which allows general toughness of the blade and ease of sharpening, laminated to high carbon steel, which gives hardness on the cutting edge and sharpness. The steel is typically Hitachi blue or white steel.
- Cutting direction − While almost all European knives are used in a rocking or sawing cut style, the yanagi-ba follows the important principle in preparing sashimi pulling with its long blade to cut in a single motion instead.

The first two characteristics are particularly for this knife, and its name yanagi is from long and pliant characteristics of a willow branch. The other characteristics are shared by all knives in Japanese cuisine.

Traditionally, yanagi-ba knives are made of carbon steel, which needs regular maintenance and oiling to prevent rust. However, many modern knives are also available in stainless steel. Typically, but not always, carbon steel blades can be honed into a sharper cutting edge.

High quality knives will have a san mai laminated steel blade construction with more durable, robust, and pliant outer layers of usually stainless steel around a core of extremely hard steel that is able to take and hold a fine sharp edge. Another technique is to use steels of differing hardness and resilience and folding them in the forging process to form a damask steel blade.

The handle is traditionally made of ho wood, which is burned in and friction-fitted to a hidden tang that does not run the full handle length. The wood is porous and fine-grained, which makes it less likely to split and retain its grip. A metal collar or buffalo horn bolster caps the handle-blade junction and further reduces the possibility splitting. This allows easy installation and replacement.

== See also ==
- Kitchen knife
- Japanese kitchen knife
  - Chef's knife – gyūtō bōchō
  - Nakiri bōchō
  - Santoku bōchō
  - Sashimi bōchō
  - Usuba bōchō
- Japanese cutlery
- List of Japanese cooking utensils
