= Scimitar (disambiguation) =

A scimitar is a type of sword.

Scimitar may also refer to:

== Military ==
- HMS Scimitar, three ships of the Royal Navy
- Scimitar-class patrol vessel, a Royal Navy class
- Supermarine Scimitar, a Royal Navy fighter aircraft
- Armstrong Whitworth Scimitar, a biplane fighter aircraft first flown in 1935
- FV107 Scimitar, a type of light tank used by the British Army
- Operation Scimitar, a 2005 coalition counterinsurgency operation of the Iraq War

== Technology ==
- Scimitar antenna, a type of aerospace radio antenna
- Scimitar propeller, a type of aircraft propeller
- Reliant Scimitar, a sports car
- Masak Scimitar, a glider designed and built by Peter Masak
- Reaction Engines Scimitar, an aircraft engine
- Scimitar (game engine), a video game engine
- Split scimitar winglets, a type of wingtip device

== Popular culture ==
- Scimitar (Marvel Comics), a Marvel Comics villain
- Scimitar Films, an English film production company founded by director Michael Winner

=== Fictional ships ===
- Scimitar medium fighter, a fictional starfighter from the Wing Commander universe
- Scimitar (Star Trek), a fictional starship in the film Star Trek: Nemesis
- Scimitar (Star Wars), the personal spaceship of Darth Maul in the Star Wars universe

== Other uses ==
- Abbeville Scimitar, a newspaper of Abbeville, South Carolina, published between 1914 and 1917
- Cimeter or scimitar, a type of butcher's knife
- Scimitar Airlines, a defunct British airline
- Scimitar cat (Homotherium serum), an extinct species of the cat family
- Scimitar Glacier, Washington State, United States
- Scimitar oryx, a species of oryx
- Scimitar syndrome, a rare congenital heart defect
- Scimitar-billed woodcreeper, a bird species in the family Dendrocolaptinae
- Scimitar-winged piha, a species of bird in the family Cotingidae
- Scimitar, an entry-level cymbal series from manufacturer Zildjian

== See also ==
- Symitar (disambiguation)
