= Akihabara massacre =

2008 civilian attack in Tokyo

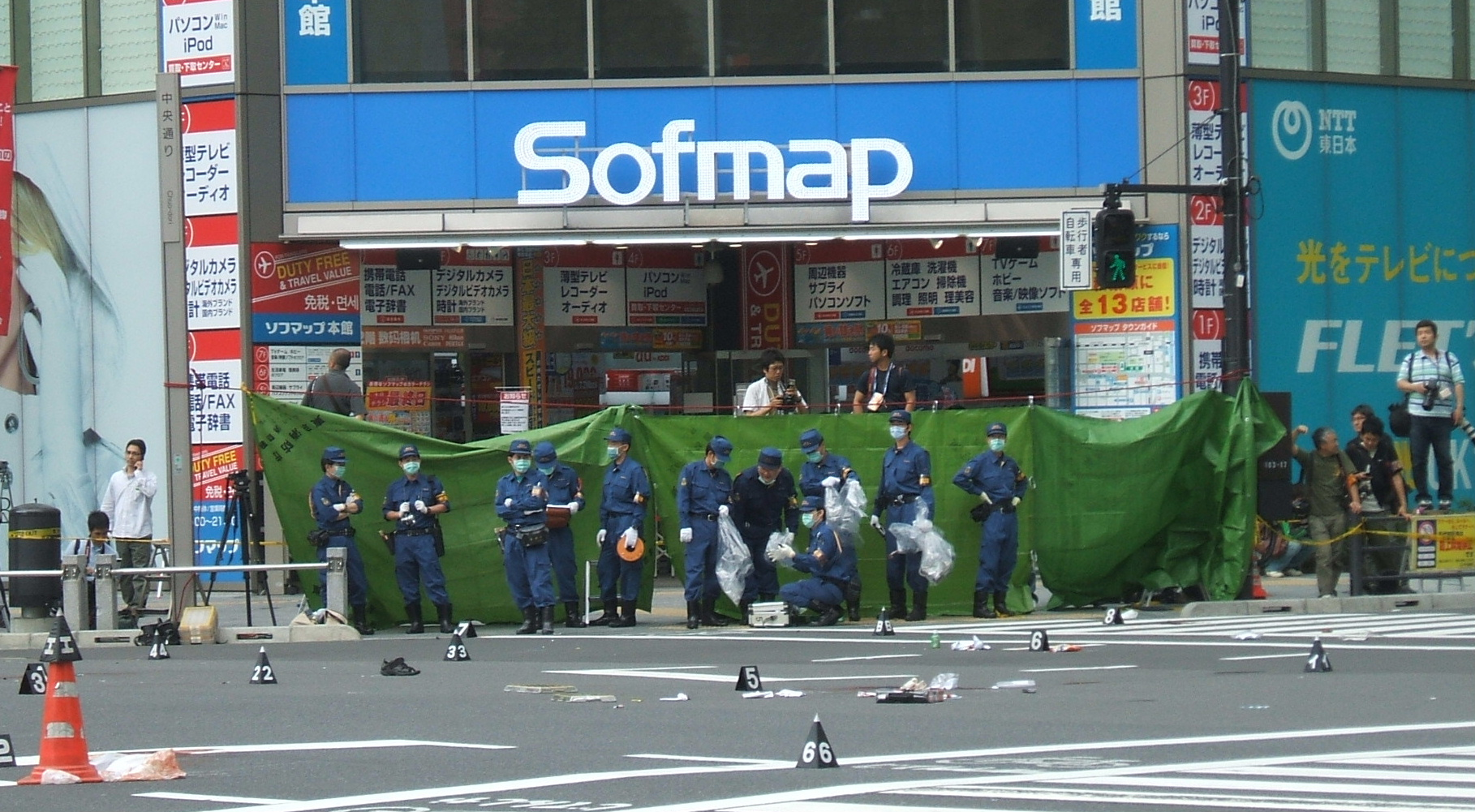
- The crossing in Akihabara shortly after the incident
- Location: 35°41′59″N 139°46′17″E; Akihabara, Chiyoda, Tokyo, Japan
- Date: 8 June 2008; 12:33–12:36 (JST)
- Attack type: Mass murder, vehicle-ramming attack, stabbing
- Weapons: Isuzu Elf truck; Smith & Wesson HRT dagger
- Deaths: 7 (3 by vehicle ramming, 4 by stabbing)
- Injuries: 11 (2 by vehicle ramming, 8 by stabbing, Including the perpetrator)
- Perpetrator: Tomohiro Katō
- Motive: Generalized discontentment with society

The Akihabara massacre is a mass murder that took place on 8 June 2008 in the Akihabara shopping quarter in Chiyoda, Tokyo, Japan. The perpetrator, 25-year-old Tomohiro Katō (加藤 智大, Katō Tomohiro) of Susono, Shizuoka, drove into a crowd with a rented truck, initially killing three people and injuring two. He then stabbed at least twelve people using a dagger, killing four and injuring eight.

Katō was sentenced to death by the Tokyo District Court in 2011. The sentence was upheld on appeal in 2015, and he was executed on 26 July 2022.

== Massacre ==
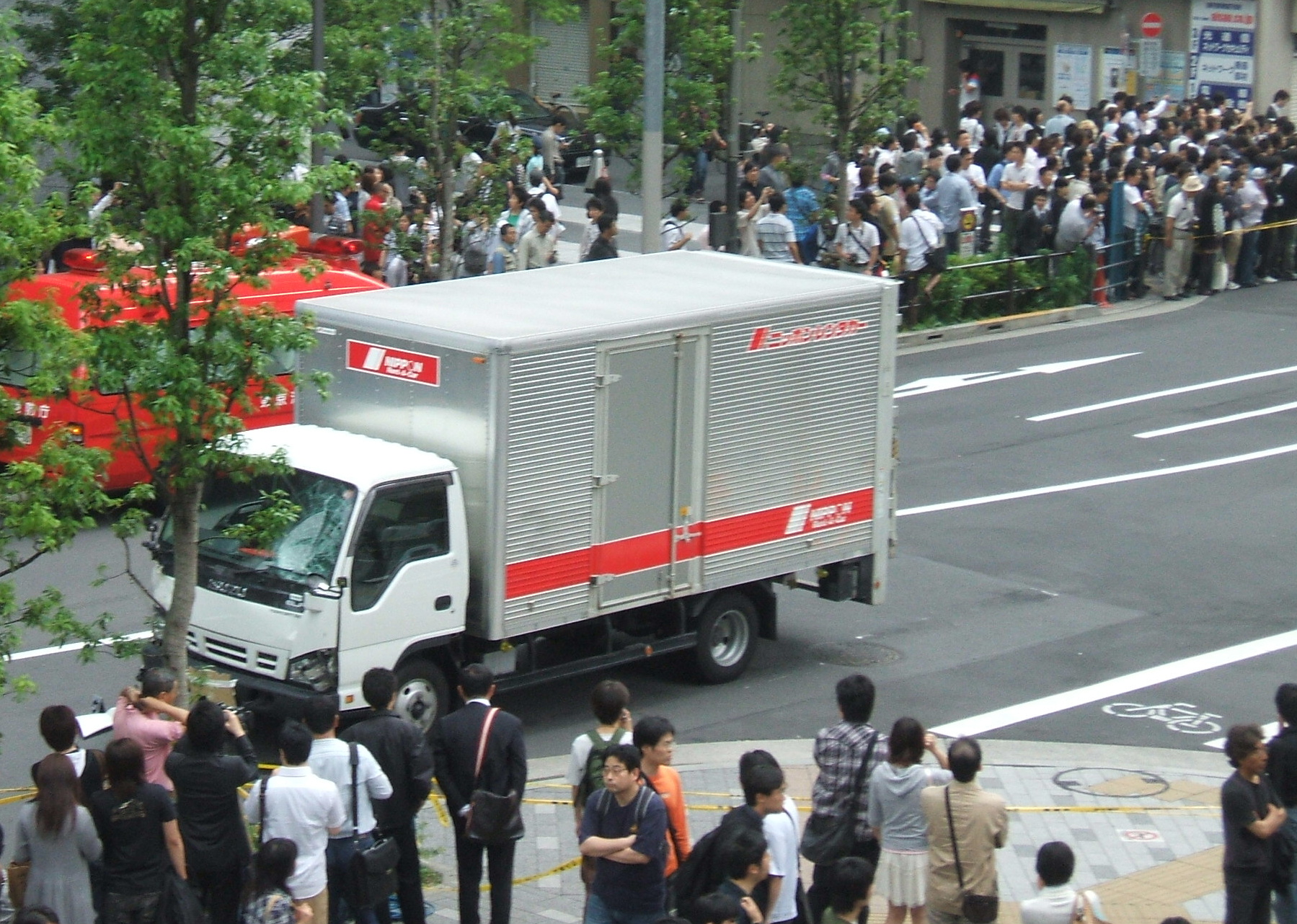
The rented truck used to run into the crowd

On 8 June 2008, Tomohiro Katō drove a five-ton rented Isuzu Elf truck into a crowd at the crossing of Kanda Myōjin-dōri and Chūō-dōri streets in Akihabara, Chiyoda, Tokyo. While Kanda Myōjin-dōri was open to vehicular traffic, Chūō-dōri was closed for the convenience of shopping pedestrians, a practice observed during Sundays and holidays.

At 12:33, Katō hit five people with the truck after ignoring a red light. As people gathered to attend to the victims, Katō climbed out of the truck and stabbed at least 12 people with a dagger, according to a witness, while screaming. Police chased Katō and cornered him in a narrow alley, and a police officer pointed a gun at him. He dropped his knife and was held down by the police at 12:35 about 170 meters (600 ft) away from the truck.

=== Victims ===
At least 17 ambulances rushed to the scene as passersby tried to aid the victims. Five of the victims reportedly died at the scene. It was initially reported two people died, and during the day the death toll increased to seven. Later, it was determined through autopsies that three victims died as a result of being hit by the truck while the other four were fatally stabbed.

According to police and hospital officials, six of the seven victims who were killed were men, including Kazunori Fujino and his friend Takahiro Kamaguchi (both 19), Katsuhiko Nakamura (74), Naoki Miyamoto (31), Mitsuru Matsui (33), and Kazuhiro Koiwa (47). One woman, Mai Mutō (21), was also killed. Communication records showed that Mutō probably made an emergency call to police from her mobile phone, though she left no message. Later that day, a makeshift memorial was created by the public.

== Perpetrator ==
Katō during the attack, armed with a knife

Tomohiro Katō (加藤 智大, Katō Tomohiro; 28 September 1982 – 26 July 2022) grew up in a suburban home in Goshogawara, Aomori Prefecture. His father was a top manager in a financial institution. Katō's grades were considered exceptional in elementary school and he was a top track athlete. He entered Tsukuda Junior High School, where he became president of the tennis club. Katō started to behave violently at home after enrolling at Aomori High School, an elite high school. There, his class academic ranking fell to 300 (of 360 students) and he failed entrance examinations for the prestigious Hokkaido University, eventually training as an auto mechanic at Nakanihon Automotive College. Katō was hired as a temporary worker at an auto parts factory in Shizuoka Prefecture, though he had been recently told that his job was to be cut at the end of June.

Katō reportedly did not get along well with his parents, and seldom returned home. His brother said that his parents had put immense pressure on both of them to perform and to excel in their studies, ordering them to redo their homework to high standards to impress teachers, and recalled an incident when Katō was made to eat scraps of food from the floor. Another neighbor recounted an incident in which Katō's parents forced him to stand outside for hours in deep, cold snow during winter. Previous online postings before his announcement of the attack contained sharp criticisms of his upbringing. Deeply in debt and believing that his family had given up on him, Katō attempted suicide in 2006 by ramming his car into a wall. Three days before the attack, on 5 June, Katō accused people at his workplace of hiding his work clothes and left the premises immediately afterwards. He believed at this point he was going to lose his job, though this was not the case, and may have triggered the attack.

Katō apparently posted messages from his mobile phone to a website called "Extreme Exchange, Revised", revealing his intentions through his final message 20 minutes before the attack. A police official stated the first message read, "I will kill people in Akihabara." Other messages he is alleged to have posted include, "If only I had a girlfriend, I wouldn't have quit work", "I would never have become addicted to my mobile phone. Anybody with hope couldn't possibly understand how I feel", and, "I don't have a single friend and I won't in the future. I'll be ignored because I'm ugly. I'm lower than trash because at least the trash gets recycled." The message also referred to "a stabbing spree in Tsuchiura". Based on Katō's messages, commentators referred to the incident as another case of Japan's hikikomori becoming more violent and suicidal. Later messages revealed Katō's plan to use a vehicle until it became inoperable, and then to use a knife to continue the attack on foot. He waited for Chūō-dōri to close at noon to vehicular traffic before commencing the attack.

== Investigation ==
Katō was arrested for attempted murder after a police officer spotted him stabbing a woman. On 10 June, the police sent him to the Tokyo District Prosecutor's Office. On 20 June, the police arrested him again on suspicion of murder of the seven victims. That day, the Prosecutor's Office withheld action on him for the first suspicion. While being positive about his capacity to be held criminally liable, the Prosecutor's Office decided by 20 June to demand that Katō's detention for a psychiatric test be authorized by the Tokyo District Court.

Katō erased all contacts and communication records from his mobile phone just prior to the attack, the purpose of which he confessed was to avoid annoying those around him. Katō later said that he posted the online messages hoping that police would take notice and stop him. The weapons Katō used in the attack were reportedly purchased two days before at a military supply shop in Fukui, at about 12:40. Katō spent about twenty minutes in the store, purchasing a telescopic baton and a pair of leather gloves, while the store's CCTV captured him conversing with the salesman and demonstrating stabbing motions. Katō came to Akihabara the day before the attack to sell his personal computer and some software to raise money to rent the truck.

== Reactions and consequences ==
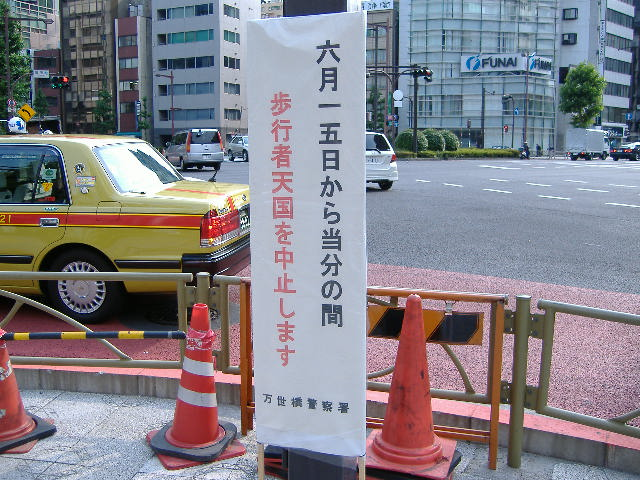
The 35-year practice of closing Chūō-dōri avenue to vehicular traffic on Sundays and holiday afternoons was discontinued after the attack. The Japanese text on the sign translates in English to "Pedestrian precinct shall be discontinued for the time being from June 15."

The Akihabara attack made global headlines and sent shock waves across Japan, shaking public confidence in what is traditionally considered a society safe from violent crime. The Japanese government said it would review laws regulating knives, while the Tokyo Metropolitan Public Safety Commission announced that the 35-year-old practice of closing Chūō-dōri on Sundays and holidays was to be suspended until safety measures were reviewed; the practice of closing traffic on Sundays resumed in 2011. On 17 June 2008, the convicted serial killer Tsutomu Miyazaki was executed by hanging, which was suspected to be a reaction to Katō's massacre.

The massacre sparked many conversations in Japanese blogs when it was discovered that two Ustream users had broadcast live video streams of the tragedy, attracting a viewership estimated at between 1,000 and 3,000 people. No known recording has been saved of the videos, although the event has been written about in many Japanese blogs and online IT magazines. The Japanese media labeled the attacks as a growing epidemic of "kireru" (キレる), acts of rage committed by Tokyo's alienated youth; others labeled the otaku culture as the answer for its negative stereotype of compulsive, antisocial behavior.

Konami canceled three launch events of the video game Metal Gear Solid 4: Guns of the Patriots in Tokyo, with the "safety of participants in mind". The Super Sentai series airing at the time of the attack, Engine Sentai Go-onger, featured transforming daggers as part of the heroes' standard personal sidearms, called "Switch Funshaken Rocket Dagger(s)". After the attack, which occurred the day immediately after the daggers made their debut in the series, both Bandai (the company that makes the toy versions of the weapons) and Toei (the company that produces the TV series) changed their names to "Switch Funshaken Rocket Booster(s)" and re-designated them as "swords" rather than "daggers" out of respect for the victims of the attack, and to lessen any trauma in the 6-to-8-year-old audience that the tokusatsu franchise regularly targets.

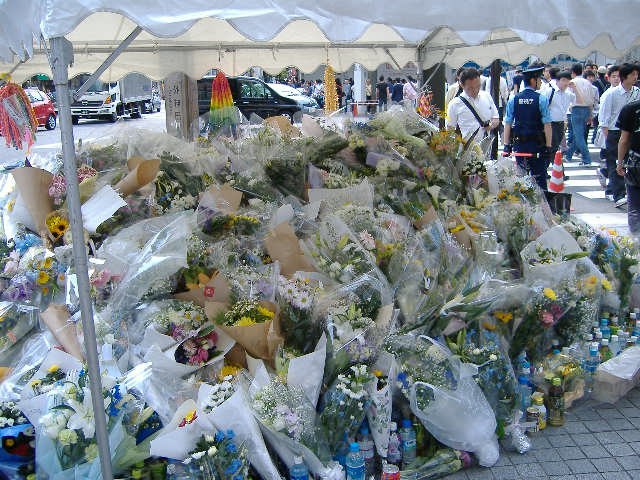
Makeshift memorial set up at Akihabara for mourning

Katō's parents gave an apology to the victims in a television interview after the massacre. As of 2010, Katō's father had resigned from his job and was living in seclusion in Aomori, while his mother had been hospitalized for mental health reasons. In April 2014, Katō's 28-year-old brother committed suicide, having previously indicated that he was unable to live with the scars and shame resulting from the massacre.

== Conviction and execution ==
On 24 March 2011, Katō was sentenced to death by the Tokyo District Court after it found him fully responsible for the attack. In September 2012, the Tokyo High Court upheld the death penalty on appeal. Katō expressed remorse over the massacre, stating that he "would like to apologize to those who passed away, the injured, and their families". Upon entering a guilty plea, he said he "knew he was the culprit though [he] had no memory of some parts of the incident". The Supreme Court of Japan upheld the death penalty on 2 February 2015. Katō's death sentence was subsequently finalized, and he was held on death row until he was executed by hanging at the Tokyo Detention House on the morning of 26 July 2022.

== Other events ==
The stabbings occurred exactly seven years after the Ikeda school massacre, where eight elementary school students were killed by Mamoru Takuma. 2008 had already seen another random knife killing by Masahiro Kanagawa, though on a smaller scale. Prime Minister Yasuo Fukuda, who visited the site a week after the massacre to offer prayer to the victims, said that he "is worried that similar cases occur about ten times a year in Japan." According to the National Police Agency, 67 similar random attacks have taken place between 1998 and 2007.

A few days after the attack, police arrested several people who stated their intention to commit copycat killings elsewhere in Japan, including one case who made his intentions known to popular message board 2channel. On 22 June, three women were injured by a female attacker at Ōsaka Station; a 38-year-old woman later confessed to attacking two of the victims with a razor. A 19-year-old man who made an Internet threat to go on a 15 June stabbing spree at Tokyo Disney Resort was arrested by police. Between eight and twenty-three people were arrested, and five people warned, for making threatening messages. The seventeen people involved in the threats ranged between ages 13 and 30. On 26 June 2008, police overpowered and arrested a man who was found to have a knife in his possession in Akihabara. In May 2019, a stabbing attack in Kawasaki, Kanagawa Prefecture, resulted in the death of at least two people.

== See also ==
- 2019 Tokyo car attack
- Bozo (film)
- Capital punishment in Japan
- List of executions in Japan
- List of massacres in Japan
- 2014 AKB48 handsaw assault
