= Füritechnics =

Australian company

Füri
- Formation: July 1996; 30 years ago
- Founder: Mark Henry
- Type: Knife Manufacturer and Developer
- Headquarters: Sydney
- Location: Australia
- Official language: English
- Website: http://furiglobal.com/

Füri is an Australian manufacturer and developer of kitchen knives that sells under the abbreviated name Füri.

== History ==
The company, originally known as Füritechnics was founded by a mechanical engineer named Mark Henry, in July 1996, in Brisbane. They soon developed themselves as the leading knife manufacturers in Australia. Due to Füritechnics' endorsement by a TV celebrity cook, Rachael Ray, they established an office in the United States, named Füritechnics USA Inc. The headquarters for Füritechnics USA was established in San Francisco in August, 2005.

In March 2006, Füritechnics appointed the largest kitchenware importer in Australia, Sheldon & Hammond, to distribute their product in Australia and New Zealand. By today Sheldond and Hammond do not sell any Füri products. As of July 2006, Füritechnics USA has signed manufacturing representation for the West and East coast regions of the United States, with the Morgan & Sampson firm.

Marlin Equity Partners, LLC, a private investment firm, announced in October 2008 its acquisition of the assets of Füritechnics Group and the subsequent formation of Füri Brands, Inc.

Füri was purchased in 2013 by McPherson's Consumer Products Pty Ltd, an Australian consumer products business, marketing and distributing a wide range of health and beauty products, household consumables and household durables throughout Asia Pacific, the UK, Europe and North America.

Furi was acquired in 2016 by FACKELMANN GmbH + Co. KG. The brand is managed in Australia by Fackelmann Housewares, a supplier of housewares products across Australia, New Zealand, Singapore and the United Kingdom, and part of the global network of Fackelmann Brands.

== Products & technologies ==
Füri most well-known product is their East-West knife, a modified santoku blade with a curved edge similar to a French chef's knife.

Some of their larger knives are designed with a copper counterweight ("Coppertail") at the end of the handle; the manufacturer claims that the counterweight can be shaved off as the blade loses mass to sharpening to keep the knife balanced. This is not universal across their several product lines, as some of their less expensive knives use stainless steel counterweights instead.

== Endorsements ==
Füri has previously been endorsed by several celebrity chefs around the world, including TV chef Rachael Ray in North America, restaurateur Stephanie Alexander in Australia and Nigella Lawson in Britain. Füri has also been endorsed by Australian chef Kylie Kwong and Emmy Award-winning country singer and cookbook author Trisha Yearwood.
