= Ikeda school massacre =

2001 mass stabbing at an elementary school in Ikeda, Osaka, Japan

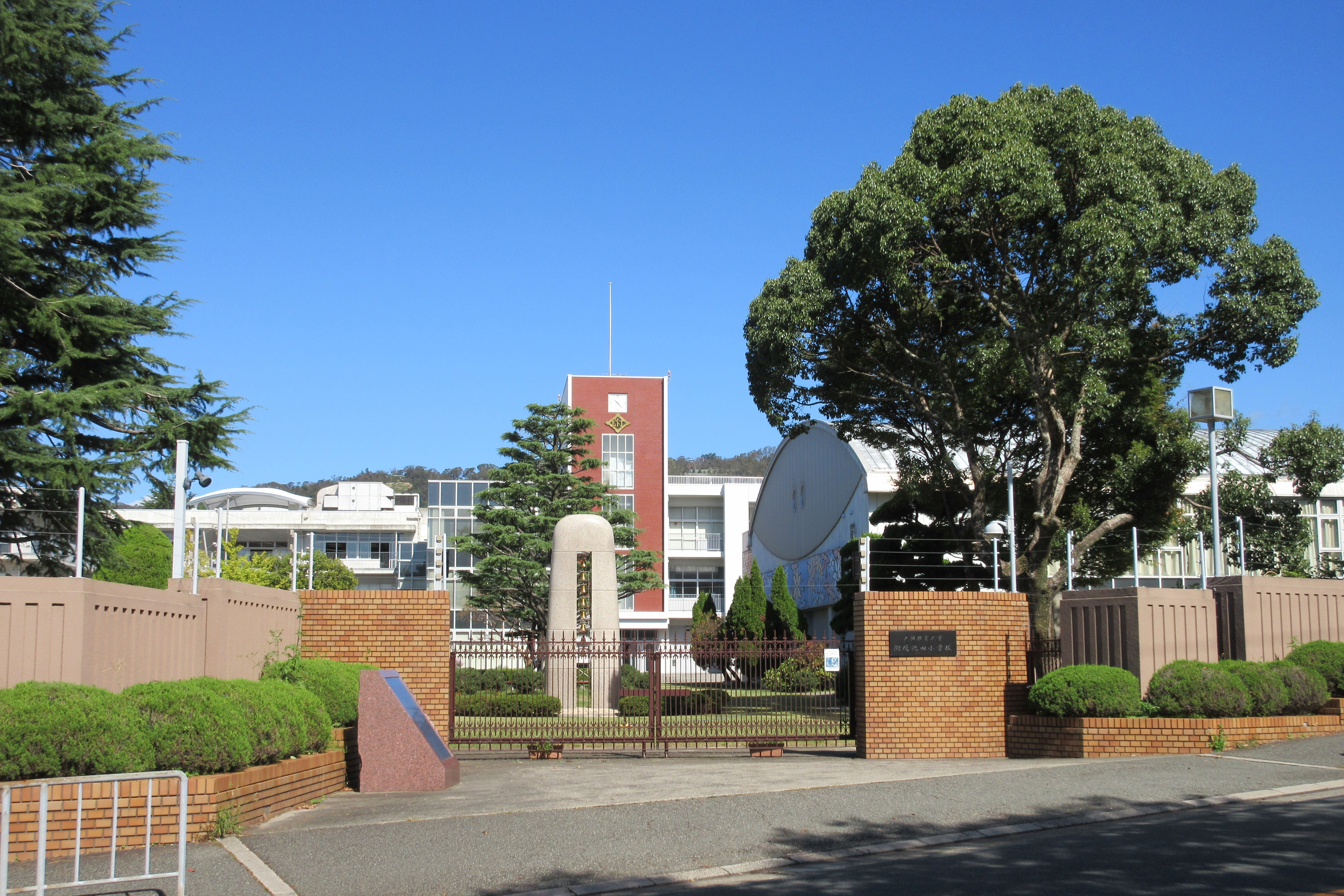
- The Ikeda Elementary School where the attack took place, pictured in 2018
- Location: 34.820152°N 135.439167°E; Ikeda, Osaka Prefecture, Japan
- Date: 8 June 2001; 25 years ago 10:15 – 10:20 a.m. (JST)
- Target: Students and staff at Ikeda Elementary School
- Attack type: Mass stabbing, school stabbing, mass murder, pedicide
- Weapons: 15.8 cm deba knife; 17.1 cm bunka knife (unused)
- Deaths: 8
- Injuries: 16 (including the perpetrator)
- Perpetrator: Mamoru Takuma
- Motive: Misanthropy

The Ikeda school massacre (sometimes referred to as the Osaka school massacre) was a school stabbing and mass murder that occurred in Ikeda, Osaka Prefecture, Japan, on 8 June 2001. Mamoru Takuma, a 37-year-old ex-convict with a history of mentally disturbed and anti-social behavior, stabbed eight students to death and seriously wounded fifteen others in a knife attack that lasted several minutes. Takuma was sentenced to death in August 2003, and executed in September 2004. As of 2026, it is currently the deadliest school attack in Japanese history.

== Perpetrator ==
Mamoru Takuma was a 37-year-old ex-convict from Itami, Hyōgo Prefecture, who had a long history of mentally disturbed and anti-social behavior since childhood and an extensive criminal record that included a conviction for rape. As a teenager, Takuma's volatile behavior led to him being kicked out of school and his father eventually disowning him. After being released from prison in 1989, Takuma moved to the nearby city of Ikeda, Osaka Prefecture, working various part-time jobs in the area but often being fired for erratic or violent behavior.

In 1999, he was detained at a psychiatric hospital while working as a janitor at Itami City Ikejiri Elementary, after slipping his temazepam into tea he served in a teachers' room at the school, resulting in four staff members being hospitalized. Takuma then attempted suicide at the psychiatric hospital, but was soon determined as fit to be released. In October 2000, Takuma was charged with assaulting a bellhop while working as a taxi driver in Osaka. He was to attend a court hearing scheduled for 8 June 2001, the day on which the massacre occurred.

== Attack ==
On 8 June 2001, the day of his court hearing for the bellhop assault case, Takuma drove to the Ikeda Elementary School, an elite school affiliated with the Osaka Kyoiku University. Earlier that morning, he tried unsuccessfully to start a fire in his apartment by using a lit cigarette to get revenge on his tenant, whom he had long disliked. Takuma then visited a knife shop at around 10:00 a.m., where he purchased a 15.8-centimetre (6.2-inch) long Deba knife, a type of kitchen knife used to cut fish, for ¥7,480. There was also a second knife in his car, which he planned to use to murder his ex-wife.

Takuma parked his car in front of the school's east gate, before making his way to the south building, which housed multiple first- and second-grade classrooms. The attack began just after 10:10 a.m.; Takuma first climbed through a window before crossing the hallway and entering a second-grade classroom, where he stabbed five students to death. He then entered two more second-grade classrooms and indiscriminately attacked those inside, killing two more students in one of the rooms. All of the students killed in these classrooms were girls, and a first-grade teacher was also stabbed in the back. Two other teachers began to chase Takuma, who briefly made a gesture as if he was going to chase after students who had fled from the first classroom he attacked, but then ran into a first-grade classroom, where he stabbed a young boy to death. He then attacked other students from the same classroom who were returning from a music class.

The massacre finally ended at around 10:20 a.m., after the vice principal and one of the teachers were able to subdue the attacker, though the teacher was slashed in the face while trying to hold back the knife. Takuma said nothing throughout the entire attack, though at the end of his rampage he began yelling incoherent statements, but eventually calmed down. Takuma was taken into custody by law enforcement, but he was first treated at a hospital for minor injuries to his left hand.

== Fatalities ==
All of the victims were female second-graders, except for one male first-grader.

- Yuki Hongo (本郷 優希 Hongō Yūki)
- Mayuko Isaka (猪阪 真宥子 Isaka Mayuko)
- Yuuka Kiso (木曽 友香 Kiso Yūka)
- Ayano Moriwaki (森脇 綾乃 Moriwaki Ayano)
- Maki Sakai (酒井 麻希 Sakai Maki)
- Takahiro Totsuka (戸塚 健大 Totsuka Takahiro) (the only boy to die in the attack)
- Hana Tsukamoto (塚本 花菜 Tsukamoto Hana)
- Rena Yamashita (山下 玲奈 Yamashita Rena)

== Aftermath ==
Takuma was diagnosed with paranoid personality disorder. He was later convicted and sentenced to death by hanging. He was executed on September 14, 2004.

The attack is currently the sixth deadliest mass murder, along with the Matsumoto incident, in recent Japanese history, surpassed in fatalities only by the Tokyo subway sarin attack, the Osaka movie theater fire, the Sagamihara stabbings, the Kyoto Animation arson attack, and the Myojo 56 building fire. At the time, it was tied with the Matsumoto sarin attack as the second deadliest, behind the Tokyo subway sarin attack. The incident set itself apart, however, by the age of the victims, its venue (a school), and the perpetrator's history of mental illness. Because of these factors, the attack raised questions about Japan's social policies for dealing with mental illness, the rights of victims and criminals, and the accessibility and security of Japanese schools.

After the attack, Yoshio Yamane, the principal administrator of the school, announced that it would bring in a security guard, an at-the-time unheard-of practice at Japanese schools. J-pop artist Hikaru Utada rearranged their song "Distance" in honor of Rena Yamashita, one of the victims. Yamashita had once won an essay contest, talking about how she respected and aspired to be a singer like Utada, renaming it "Final Distance".

Some children, faculty, and parents developed post-traumatic stress disorder (PTSD). As of 2022, the school continues to hold yearly memorial services dedicated to the victims of the attack.

== See also ==
- Akihabara massacre, which happened exactly 7 years after
- School massacre
- List of massacres in Japan
