= Unagisaki hōchō =

Japanese knife for filleting eel

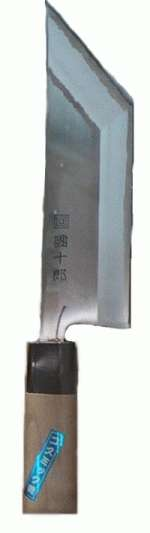
Regular unagisakihōchō

An unagisakihōchō (鰻裂き包丁, lit. 'eel filleting knife') is a knife specialized for filleting eel. The sharp tip of the knife is pushed into the eel near the head, and then slid along the body of the eel to open up the entire length of the fish. Besides the standard version as shown in the picture, there are many other local styles that differ significantly for different cities in Japan like Nagoya, Osaka, and Kyoto.

== See also ==
- Japanese cutlery
- List of Japanese cooking utensils
