= Usuba bōchō =

Professional Japanese chef's knife

A 210mm Kansai Usuba forged by dentō kōgeishi master smith Yoshikazu Tanaka in Aogami #1 steel and ground by “Mosuke.”

(a) Kataba edge for right-hand use — (b) Ryōba double bevel edge — (c) Kataba edge for left-hand use. (The sample knife is a deba bōchō)

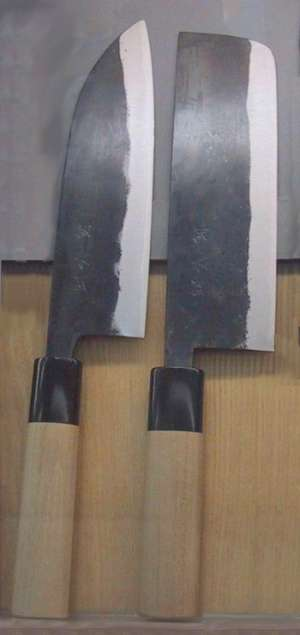
Usuba bōchō with an Osaka-style blade (left) and Tokyo-style blade (right)

Usuba bōchō (薄刃包丁 — lit. "thin blade kitchen knife") is the traditional vegetable knife for the professional Japanese chef. Like other Japanese professional knives, usuba are chisel ground, and have a single bevel on the front side, and have a hollow ground urasuki on the back side. Usuba characteristically have a straight edge, with little or no curve, and are wide or tall blade in height, to allow knuckle clearance when chopping on a cutting board. A usubas is relatively thin compared to other knives, required for cutting through firm vegetables without cracking them. Due to its height and straight edge, they are also used for specialized cuts such as katsuramuki, shaving a vegetable cylinder into a thin sheet.

The usuba blade is generally between 15 and 24 centimetres (6 and 9 inches) long.

The usuba bōchō is used by professionals and differs from the related nakiri bōchō, which is preferred for home use. While the blade of a nakiri has a double bevel, the usuba is sharpened only from one side, a style known as kataba in Japanese. This kataba style edge gives better cuts and allows for the cutting of thinner slices than the ryōba used for nakiri, but requires more skill to use. The highest quality kataba blades have a slight depression (urasuki) on the flat side. The sharpened side is usually the right side for a right-handed use of the knife, but knives are available sharpened for left-handed use. The usuba is heavier than a nakiri, although still much lighter than a deba bōchō.

There are several variations of the usuba bōchō based on regional styles. The Kantō variation has a square blunt tip, making it appear like a small meat cleaver. The kamagata-style variation, from Kansai, has a spine that drops down to the edge at the tip — a sheep's foot tip — allowing the usuba to do fine delicate work. However, this tip is also delicate and can be broken easily. These are particularly popular with Kyoto chefs, who use the kamagata usuba for most of their work. Since Kyoto is landlocked, they rely more heavily on vegetables than Tokyo, making the usuba the quintessential knife of professional chefs there. In Kyoto cuisine, the versatile tip allows for intricate cuts and preparations.

== See also ==
- Japanese kitchen knives
  - Chef's knife — gyūtō bōchō
  - Deba bōchō
  - Nakiri bōchō
  - Santoku bōchō
  - Sashimi bōchō
- List of Japanese cooking utensils
