= Nakiri bōchō =

Japanese knife for cutting vegetables

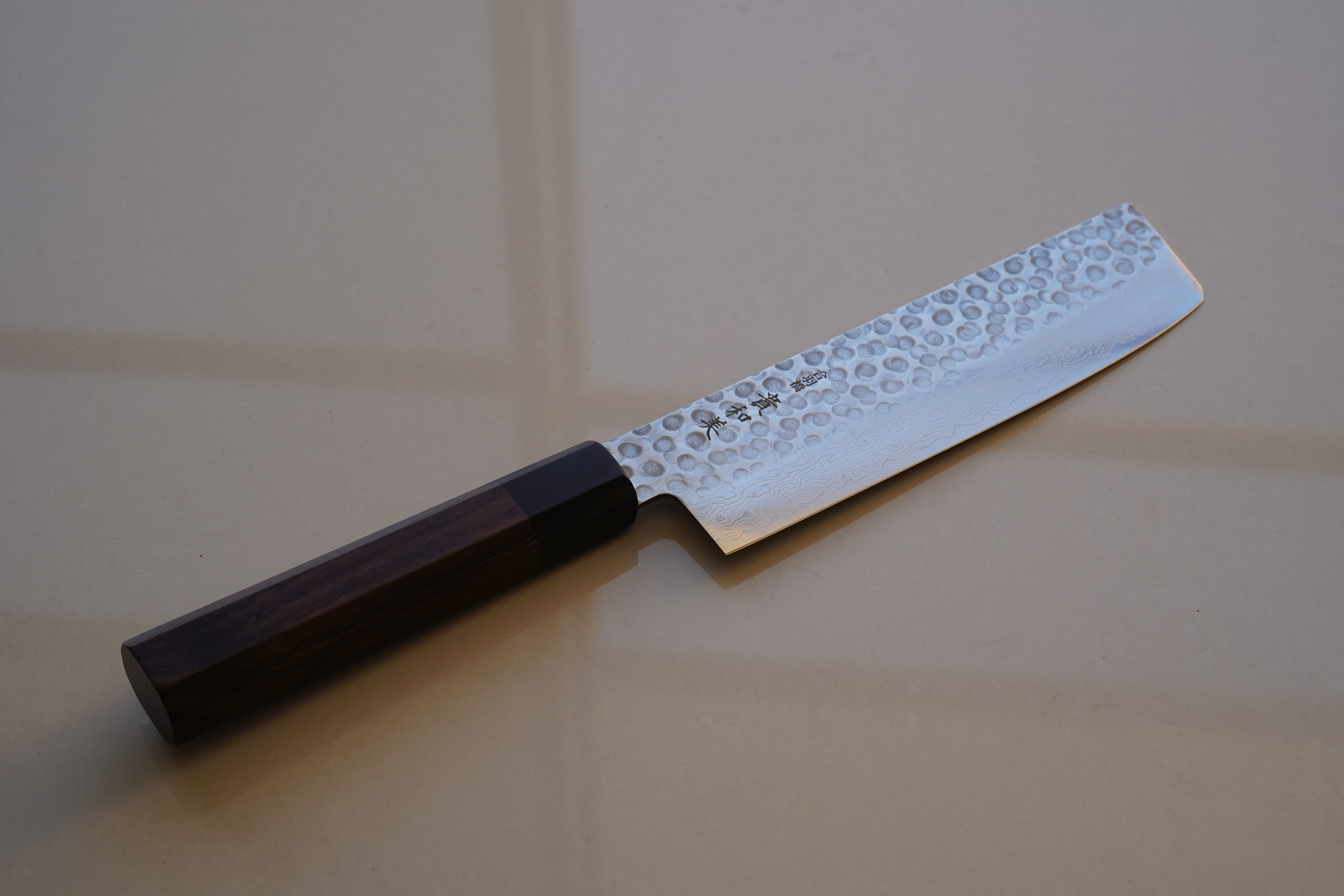
A nakiri with a blade of 165 millimetres (6 inches) made from hammered Damascus steel, with a wa-shiki (Japanese-style) handle

Nakiri bōchō (菜切り包丁, translation: knife for cutting greens) and usuba bōchō (薄刃包丁, lit. "thin knife") are Japanese-style vegetable knives. They differ from the deba bōchō in their shape, as they have a straight blade edge, with no or virtually no curve, suitable for cutting all the way to the cutting board without the need for a horizontal pull or push. These knives are also much thinner. While the deba is a thick blade for easy cutting through thin bones, the blade is not suitable for chopping vegetables, as the thicker blade can break the vegetable slice. The nakiri and the usuba have much thinner blades. This does not help with cutting small bones in fish or meat, but is useful for cutting vegetables.

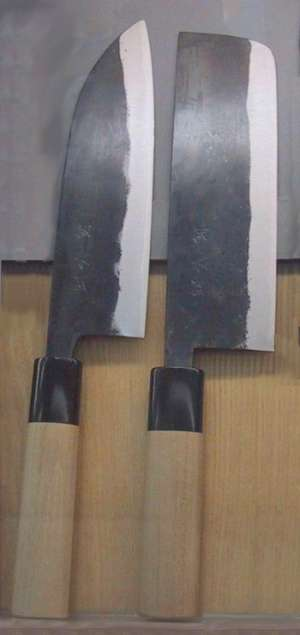
Nakiri bōchō with an Osaka-style blade (L) and Tokyo-style blade (R)

Nakiri bōchō are knives for home use, and sometimes have a Kurouchi black-finished blade. The cutting edge is sharpened with a double bevelled (from both sides) sharpener, called ryōba in Japanese. This makes it easier to cut straight slices. A nakiri blade is generally between 15 and 20 centimetres (6 and 8 inches) long.

There are regional differences to the style of the knife tip with a sheep's foot drop tip on knives from Osaka, whereas the dominant style from Tokyo is for a squared tip giving a cleaver-like appearance.

(a) Kataba edge for right-hand use; (b) Ryōba double bevel edge; (c) Kataba edge for left-hand use. (The sample knife is a deba bōchō.)

Usuba bōchō are vegetable knives used by professionals. They differ from the nakiri bōchō in the shape of the cutting edge. While the nakiri is sharpened from both sides, the usuba is sharpened only a single-bevelled edge, a style known as kataba in Japanese. The highest quality kataba blades have a slight depression—urasuki—on the flat side, which gives better cuts and allows for the cutting of thinner slices than the ryōba used for nakiri, but requires more skill to use. The sharpened side is usually the right side for a right-hand use of the knife, but knives sharpened on the left side are available for left-hand use. The usuba is heavier than a nakiri, although still much lighter than a deba.

== See also ==
- Japanese kitchen knives
  - Gyūtō bōchō — chef's knife
  - Deba bōchō
  - Santoku bōchō
  - Sashimi bōchō
  - Usuba bōchō
- List of Japanese cooking utensils
