= Japanese kitchen knife =

Type of knife used for food preparation

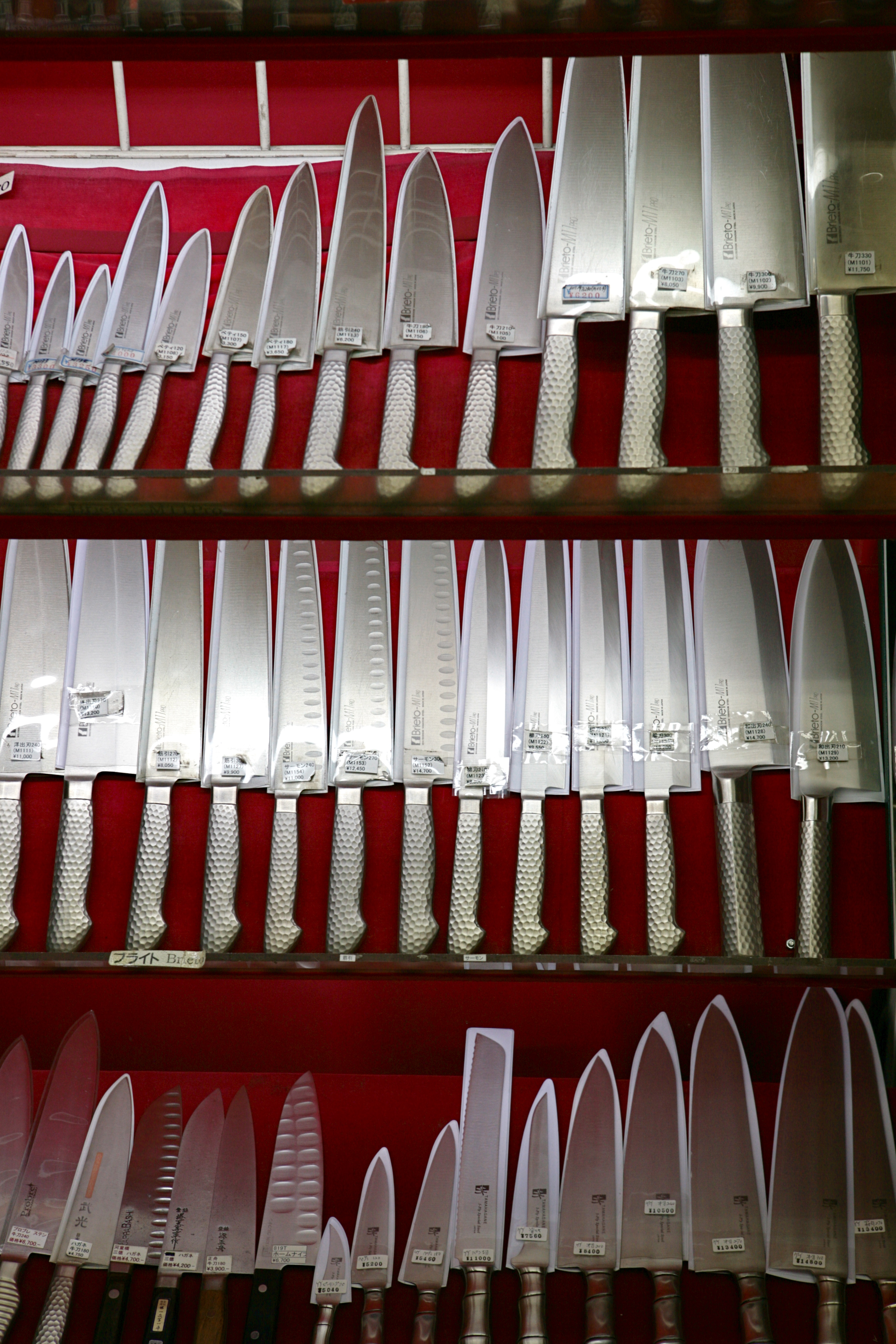
Hōchō, Japanese kitchen knives in Tokyo

A Japanese kitchen knife is a type of kitchen knife used for food preparation. These knives come in many different varieties and are often made using traditional Japanese blacksmithing techniques. They can be made from stainless steel, or hagane, which is the same kind of steel used to make Japanese swords. Most knives are referred to as hōchō (Japanese: 包丁/庖丁) or the variation -bōchō in compound words (because of rendaku) but can have other names including -ba (〜刃; lit. "-blade") and -kiri (〜切り; lit. "-cutter"). There are four general categories used to distinguish the Japanese knife designs:

1. handle — Western v. Japanese construction, or a fusion of the two
2. blade grind — single bevel, kataba v. double bevel, ryōba (outside of kitchen knives, these can mean single/double edged)
3. steel — stainless v. (high) carbon
4. construction — laminated v. mono-steel

== Handle ==
Western handles have a bolster and a full or partial tang held together by several metal rivets. These handles are often heavier, but are smaller in volume and surface area than most Japanese handles. The scale handle materials are often synthetic or resin-cured engineered wood and are non-porous. Chefs who prefer the feel of a Western handle, enjoy a more handle-heavy balance and grip the handle closer to the blade. This allows for more weight in the cut.

Western knife handles are usually shaped along their length to form a grip, whereas the sides are traditionally flattened. In very recent times, there has been a move to expand the roundedness to the sides of the handle giving a more complex cross-section. In contrast, Japanese knife handles typically have an oval or octagonal cross-sectional shape, with no longitudinal shaping, which is either straight or has a gradual taper towards the blade. Another common shape is the D-shape, which is an oval handle with a ridge running along the same side as the edge bevel, (right side of handle for a right-handed knife). These handles are proportionally larger, but also lighter in weight for the size of blade, so altering the balance of the knife itself.

Japanese handles, on the other hand, are traditionally made of ho wood, which is burned in and friction-fitted to a hidden tang that does not run the full handle length. The wood is porous and fine-grained, which makes it less likely to split and retain its grip. A metal collar or buffalo horn bolster caps the handle-blade junction and further reduces the possibility splitting. This allows easy installation and replacement.

More decorative woods, such as ebony, yew, cherry, or chestnut, may be made into handles, though they are heavier and often charred on the outside to improve grip and water resistance. If they are not cured well or properly cared for, these decorative woods will crack more easily when exposed to moisture.

Pak or Pakka wood is a composite material of laminated wood bound in a synthetic resin matrix. It has the advantages of that is more durable, not porous and so waterproof, and is less likely to split. It is used on less expensive knives commonly replacing either the buffalo horn bolster, or both the bolster and the handle. The most common wood variant is chestnut.

== Blade ==
(a) Kataba edge for right-hand use — (b) Ryōba double bevel edge — (c) Kataba edge for left-hand use (The sample knife is a deba bōchō)

=== Single-bevel knives ===
Traditionally, Japanese knives are single-bevel edged — kataba — and this remains the dominant style. These are the knives of the established traditional Japanese cuisine and were originally developed from the Chinese double-beveled knives.

They have an omote, (an edge on the right for right-handers); a shinogi, (where the front bevel meets the flat of the blade face); and an urasuki, (a hollow on the unbeveled side that releases food). These knives are usually a little thicker at the spine and body than Japanese double bevels, but are thinner right behind the edge. While they leave a better surface finish, the produce must bend further because of the thickness of the blade. They are sharpened along the single bevel by applying pressure to both the shinogi and the edge. Honbazuke is the initial sharpening that forms a flat surface along the perimeter of the urasuki strengthening it. This practice also straightens the backside and lays a shape for future sharpening. The omote is sharpened much more than the urasuki in order to maintain the function of the single bevel.

The blade tips vary in style across Japan. Kansai-style knives usually have pointed tip for vertical cuts, which helps in decorative tip work. Edo-style knives are typically shorter with a square tip used for horizontal cuts, rendering a more robust working knife.

The standard Japanese knife set, essential to Washoku (和食 — Japanese cuisine), includes the yanagi-ba, deba bōchō, and usuba bōchō.

Single-bevelled knives include:

- Shobu-bōchō — 刺身 — three main sashimi knives:
  - Yanagi-ba — 柳刃 — (literally: "willow blade"). The most popular knife for cutting fish, also known as shobu-bōchō (sashimi knife). It is used to highlight different textures of fish in their techniques: hirazukuri to pull cut vertically, usuzukuri to pull cut thin vertically, and sogizukuri to pull cut at an angle. It is used to skin and sometimes scale and de-bone certain fish (for instance salmon). Yanagi-ba have angled tips and are generally heavier and have less sloping. The general blade size is from 27 to 33 centimetres (11 to 13 inches).
  - Tako-hiki — (lit: "octopus cutter") A regional variant of the yanagi-ba from Tokyo, that is lighter, thinner, flatter, and shallower in blade height with a square tip than yanagi-ba to allow easier cutting through dense flesh such as that of an octopus.
  - Fugu-hiki — (lit: "pufferfish cutter") Another regional variant of the yanagi-ba, with a thinner blade and a round tip, that is for the very careful preparation of poisonous fugu.

A 165 mm Hitohira Togashi Deba, handmade in Sakai, with an iron-clad Shirogami #2 blade

- Deba — 出刃 — (lit: 'pointed carver'). Thick knives with a broad slightly rounded arrow shape blade, to cut through resilient fish flesh for fillet and to cut through rib bones, behind the head, and through the head. Typically, they are between 5 and 10 millimetres (0.2 and 0.4 inches) thick depending on size. They include hon-deba (lit: "true deba"); ko-deba ("small deba"); aji-kiri (for aji); funayuki (a smaller, more pointed form for use on boats); mioroshi deba (a hybrid between deba and yanagi-ba that are intermediate in thickness, weight, and length); and yo-deba (lit: "Western-styled deba"). The smaller sizes are less thick, allowing the knife to move through flesh easily, and are much more nimble. They are still much thinner behind the edge and more fragile than a Western butchering knife. The general blade size is from 12 to 21 centimetres (4 1/2 to 8 1/2 inches).

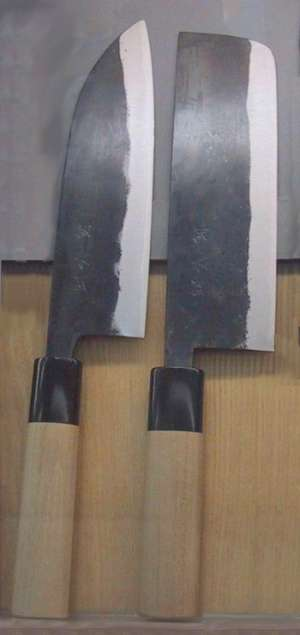
Regional knife variants with the kamagata-usuba (sheep's foot tip) and edo-usuba (square tip).

- Usuba — 薄刃 — (lit: 'thin blade') It is the thinnest of the three general knife shapes, which utilizes a flat edge profile. A vegetable cleaver similar in shape profile to the double-bevel nakiri as well as usage. It is used for push cutting, katsuramuki (rotary cutting of thin sheets) and sengiri (cutting thin strips from those sheets). There are regional edo-usuba (square tip) and kamagata-usuba (sheep's foot tip) variants. The general blade size range is from 15 to 24 cm (6 to 9 in).

- Mukimono — Used along with usuba for vegetables and it has an angled tip for decorative vegetable cutting. The general blade size range is from 15 to 21 cm (6 to 8 in).

- Kiritsuke — A large hybrid with the length of yanagi-ba and the blade height and profile of usuba with an angled tip as a compromise. It requires great knife control because of the height, length, and flatness. The general blade size range is from 24 cm (9 in) to 30 cm (12 in).

- Hone-suki — A small triangular knife used to debone chicken. Most have an angled tip to slip between tendons and cut them. The general blade size range is from 12 to 18 cm (5 to 7 in)

- Gara-suki — A thicker version of the hone-suki, capable of cutting through chicken bones.

- Hamo-kiri — (lit: pike conger cutter). It is a knife intermediate in thickness and length between deba and yanagi-ba to cut the thin bones and flesh of pike conger. The general blade size range is from 24 cm (9 in) to 30 cm (12 in).
- Unagi-saki — 鰻裂き — (lit: "eel cutting knife") This knife comes in style variants from Kanto, Kyoto, Nagoya, and Kyushu.
- Soba-kiri — (lit: soba cutter). A large oblong knife for cutting noodles, with a udon-kiri (udon noodles cutter) variant. The general blade size range is from 21 cm (8 in) to 30 cm (12 in).
- Mochi-kiri — (lit: mochi cutter). Used in preparation of mochi (Japanese rice cake) and comes in double-handle or single-handle variants.
- Maguro-kiri — (lit: tuna cutter). It is used to cut perpendicular (shorter) or parallel (longer and more flexible) to the very large Pacific blue-fin tuna and is sized accordingly. The general blade size range is from 40 to 150 cm (20 to 60 in), so these are not normally found in domestic kitchens.

=== Double bevel knives ===
Japan adopted French and German cutlery ideas during the Meiji period in the late 19th century, integrating them into Japanese cutting techniques and culture. Japanese knives are often flatter and lighter than their European counterparts. Traditional Western knives are made with a double bevel — ryōba — which tapers symmetrically to the cutting edge on each side. Single-bevel knives, kataba, which only taper to one side (typically the right), can require more care and expertise when both using and in sharpening.

Double-bevelled knives include:

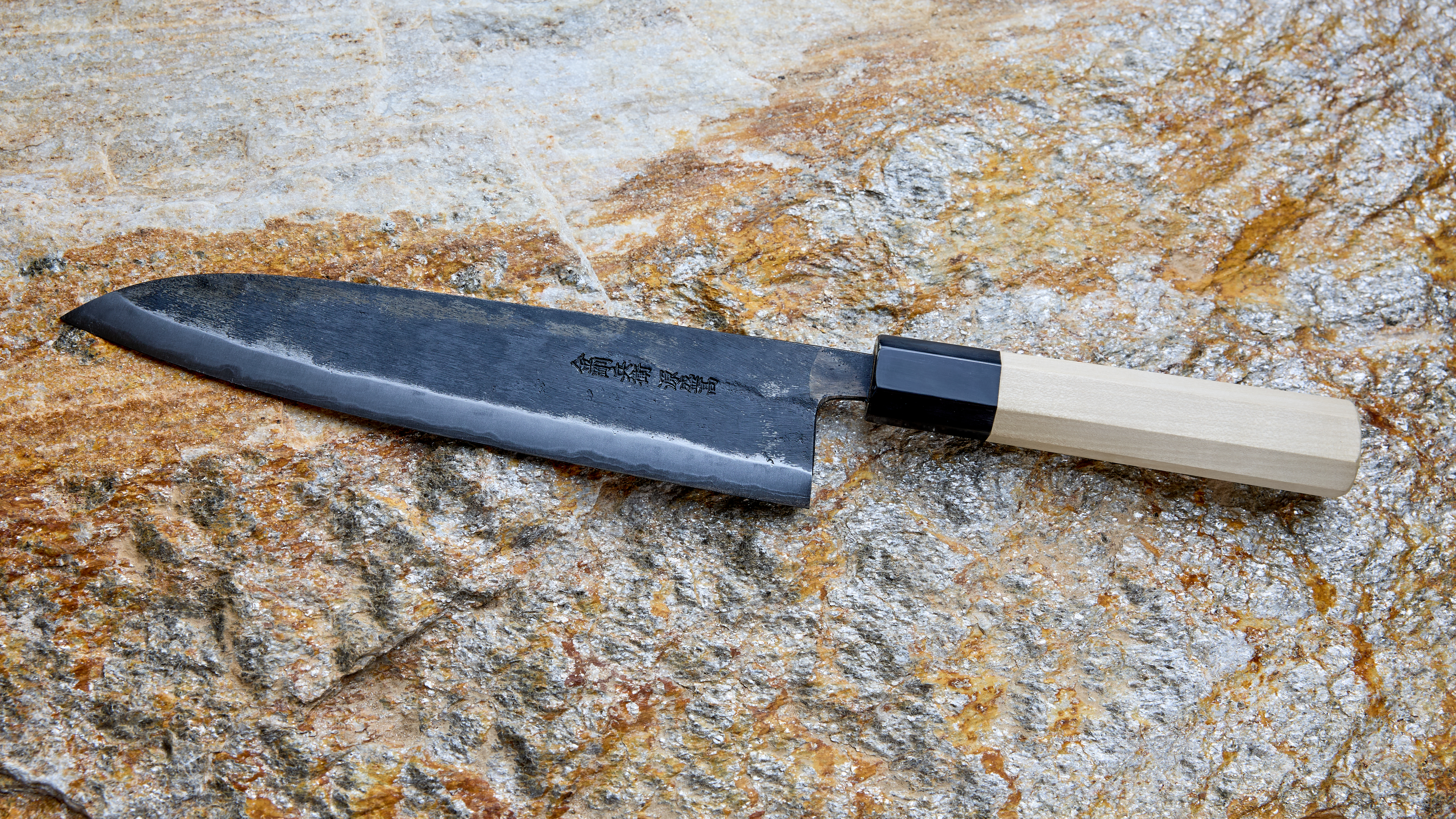
A handforged Gyūtō by Moritaka Hamono in Yatsushiro

- Gyūtō bōchō — 牛刀 — (lit: "beef-knife"). This is the Japanese word, for a regular Western chef's knife, used outside of Japan, for the Japanese versions of the knife type. Used for professional Western cuisine. When preparing vegetables, it is used in the form of chopping or thrust-cutting near the heel of the knife. The gyuto is used to rock-chop stiffer produce and to make fine cuts at the tip of the knife. It is used for many different cuts of meat. For larger cuts it is used to saw back and forth. It is used to pull-cut softer meats and push-cut more muscular cuts of meat. There is usually a slope from the heel of the knife to the tip, causing the wrist to point down and the shoulder to raise when cutting. The blade size ranges from 20 cm (8 in) to 27 cm (11 in), with a shorter blade being more nimble, a longer blade giving more slicing power, and an intermediate length as a compromise for general use.

A santoku (left) in comparison to a bunka bōchō (right) showing the differing tips, with both having traditional Japanese octagonal cross-section handles

- Santoku — 三德 — (lit: "three virtues"). San is translated as "3", whereas the "virtues", or more applicable "uses/purposes", being probably more relevant for English speakers. This derives from the best traits of three other knives: the deba, nakiri, and gyūtō bōchō when it was developed in the 1940s. As a general multi-purpose utility kitchen knife, the santoku can be used for cutting meat, fish, and/or vegetables, against the more specialized knives being designed for just one task, such as the hankotsu, usuba, yaniga-ba etc. Generally, the santoku have a less curved edge to the blade than a gyūtō bōchō and have a less acute tip, instead having a down-turned rounded tip, (i.e. a sheep's foot). Since the cutting edge is straighter, the wrist is in a more natural position and the shoulder does not need to be raised as high. These knives do not require as much room to cut. These are the most popular knives in most Japanese homes. The general size ranges from 16 to 20 cm (6 to 8 in).

- Bunka bōchō — 文化 包丁 — (lit: "cultural kitchen knife"). This knife is a variant of the santoku, but instead of the curved sheep's foot tip, the bunka bōchō, however, has a more angular, straight tip. This difference is clear in the image showing the comparison of the two knives.
- Nakiri bōchō — 菜切 — (lit: "vegetable cutter"). The square tip makes the knife feel more robust and secure than the pointed tip of the santoku or gyuto, which allows it to cut dense products at the tip. This knife has a flat edge. Some varieties of a nakiri have a slightly tilted blade profile towards the handle. This makes the grip more comfortable, causing the hand tilt up slightly and enabling one to use strength from their forearm when cutting. The general size ranges from 16 to 18 cm (6 to 7 in).

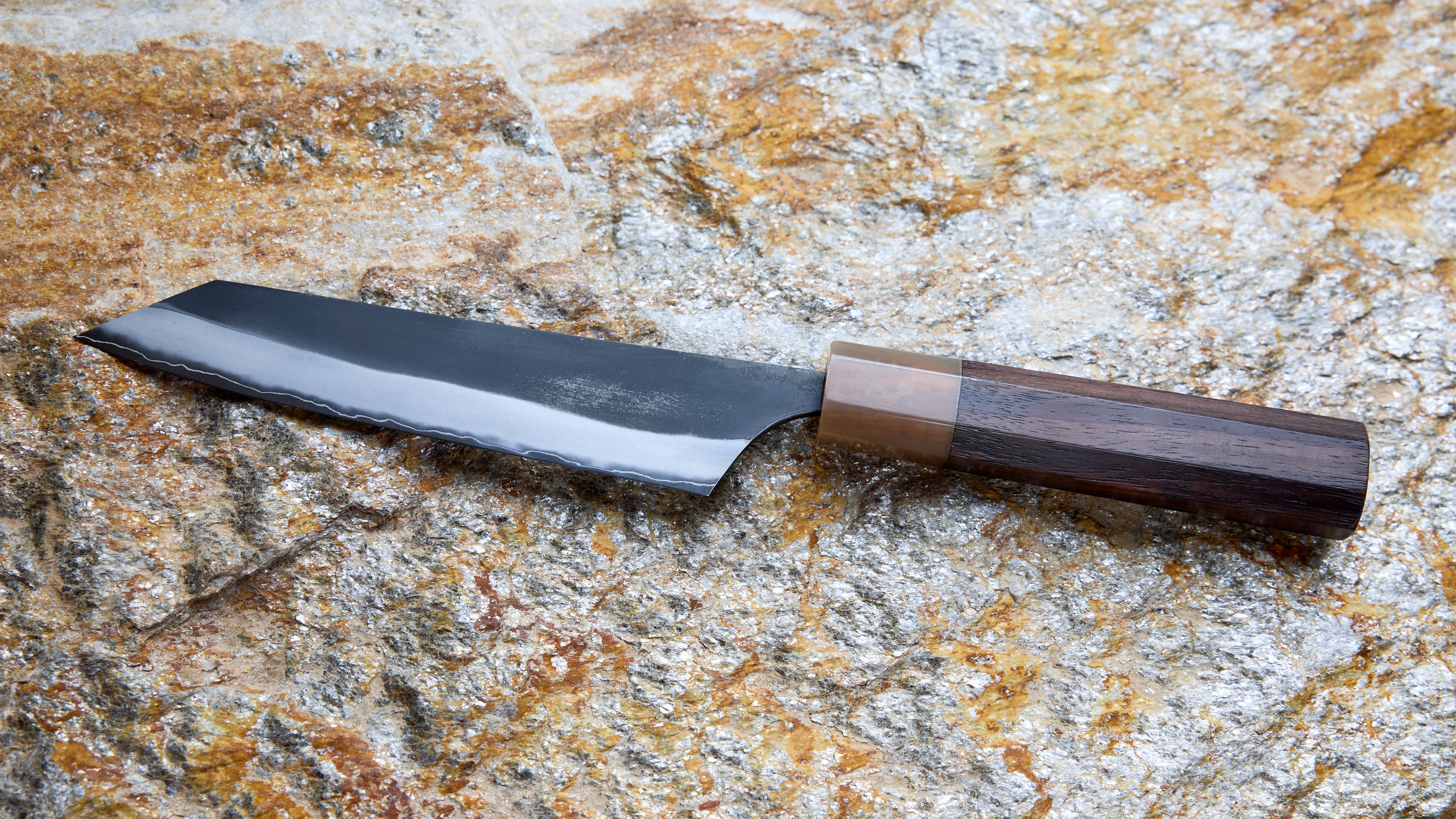
A 135 mm Japanese kiritsuke-style petty knife made by Masashi Yamamoto in Sanjo

- Petty — The Japanese equivalent of a paring knife or utility knife. This is a smaller knife for paring or for smaller produce, often used to accompany the gyuto. The general sizes range from 10 to 18 centimetres (4 to 7 inches).

- Suji-hiki — 筋引 — (lit: "muscle/sinews puller"). These are long knives used to cut meat, often in the form of a draw cut. The general sizes range from 24 cm (9 in) to 30 cm (12 in).

- Hankotsu — (lit: "rebellious"). This is a boning butchering knife used for cattle to cut hanging meat from the bone, with a pointed tip and a short height which allows the user to turn to cut along bone, connective tissue or fat. The general size is 15 centimetres (6 inches).

- Katsuobushi-kiri — 鰹節切 — (lit: "bonito-cutter"). This knife is used to slice very thin scales of katsuobushi — bonito or skipjack tuna that has been smoked, fermented, and dry cured over a long period until small hard fillets — in preparation to use it as an ingredient in many dishes. The blade is short, about 6.5 cm (2 1/2 in) in length and resembles a wood-carving knife. By-and-large, a katsuobushi kezuriki, a wooden box mandoline is used instead now to shave these tough fillets.

- Chūka bōchō — 中華 包丁 — (lit: "China kitchen knife"). Commonly known as the Chinese chef’s knife, the chūka bōchō has a short handle, flat profile, and a tall blade used to gain mechanical advantage. The blade is usually thicker behind the edge to cut denser ingredients. Though sometimes called a "Chinese cleaver", they typically cannot cut through bones.

== Steel ==
The defining qualities or characteristics of the metal of Japanese kitchen knives are:

- toughness — resistance to breaking
- sharpness — smallest carbide and grain for smallest apex reduce force in cutting
- edge life — an index for the length of time an edge will cut based on lack of edge rolling or chipping
- edge quality — toothy with large carbides or refined with small carbides
- ease of sharpening — steel easily abrades on stone and forms a sharp edge

Although each steel has its own chemical and structural limits and characteristics, the heat treatment and processing can bring out traits both inherent to the steel and like its opposite counterparts.

Carbon steel is generally harder and sharper, but is more brittle, less tough, and corrodes more easily, (usually with a dulling and blackening of the metallic patina).

- White steel — purified from phosphorus and sulfur and unalloyed with variants 1, 2, and 3 (from higher to lower carbon)
- Blue mokumegane steel — purified and alloyed with chromium and tungsten for edge life and toughness with variants 1 and 2
- Super-blue steel — blue steel alloyed with molybdenum and vanadium and more carbon for longer edge life, but are a little more brittle

Stainless steel is generally tougher and less likely to chip, but are more difficult to hone and so can be less sharp than carbon steel. In the highest quality though, it retains an edge longer and the grain structure is similarly sized in its carbides to carbon steel. Variants include:

- Powdered steel — with large carbides broken up by powdering process and sintered together under high pressure and temperature
- Semi-stainless steel — with less chromium that prevents rust of the iron and intermediate properties between carbon and stainless steel
- Tool steel — heavily alloyed that may or may not be stainless

== Construction ==
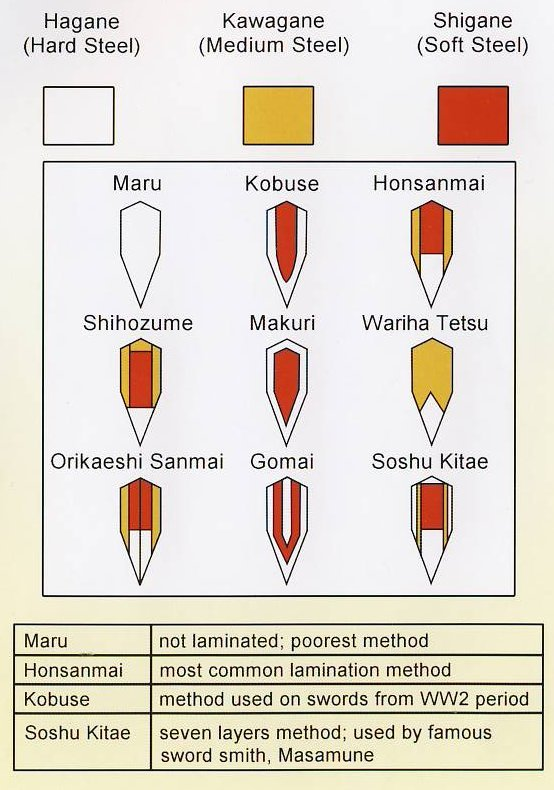
mono-steel (top-left) construction v. various laminated forms of blade construction

Mono-steel blades are usually harder to sharpen and thinner than laminated blades. Three kinds of mono-steel blades are:

- Zenko — stamped out
- Honyaki — forged down from carbon steel with differential hardening
- Forged down from a billet without differential hardening

Laminated steel blades come in 3 different types:

- awase — meaning 'mixed', for mixed steel
- kasumi — meaning 'misty', referring to the misty look of iron after sharpening
- hon-kasumi — higher quality kasumi

Forming a laminated blade involves two or more pieces of steel, the jigane / shigane and the hagane / tamahagane. The jigane refers to soft cladding or skin of stainless steel, and hagane refers to hard cutting carbon steel core. There is sometimes an intermediate kawagane layer of a medium steel. This combination of metals makes laminated blades corrosion-resistant with the stainless steel, and strong with the high-carbon steel. Blade construction with stainless steel cladding over a carbon steel core is less common due to manufacturing difficulty. The jigane allows for a tougher, more robust knife by absorbing shocks but can still be easily sharpened. It also allows for the hagane harder without making the whole blade fragile. The two forms of laminated blades are:

- Ni-mai — jigane spine with hagane blade edge
- San-mai — hagane sandwiched between jigane

A variation on the traditional laminated blade style is to form an artistic pattern in the jigane; patterns include:

- Suminagashi
- Damascus
- Kitaeji
- Mokume-gane
- Watetsu

== Production ==
After the Meiji Restoration in 1868, the samurai were banned from carrying swords as part of an attempt to modernize Japan. Though a demand for military swords remained and some sword-smiths still produced traditional samurai swords as art, the majority of sword-smiths refocused their skill to cutlery production, following the cultural shift. Thus, Japan has many dispersed centres of kitchen knife production due to diversification that followed in wake of this legislation restricting the production of sword-making. This is unlike European nations that typically have just one or two major centres of knife productions, such as Sheffield in England, Thiers, Puy-de-Dôme in France, Eskilstuna in Sweden, and Solingen in Germany. Amongst a number of others, notable Japanese cities specialising in knife-making are:

- Sakai in Osaka Prefecture
- Seki in Gifu Prefecture
- Takefu-Echizen in Fukui Prefecture
- Tosa in Kōchi Prefecture
- Tsubame-Sanjō in Niigata Prefecture

Each area have their own style of knife, with Sakai in Osaka favouring the "sheep's foot" or drop point, in contrast to the square-tipped style of Edo, modern-day Tokyo.

A great deal of high-quality Japanese steel cutlery originates from Sakai in Osaka Prefecture, the principal city of Japanese sword-smithing since the 14th century. When tobacco was introduced to Japan by the Portuguese in the 16th century, Sakai craftsmen started to make knives for cutting tobacco. The Sakai knife industry received a major boost from the Tokugawa shogunate (1603–1868), which granted Sakai a special seal of approval and enhanced its reputation for quality.

Today, Seki in Gifu Prefecture is considered the home of modern Japanese kitchen cutlery. Many major cutlery-making companies are based in Seki, producing kitchen knives in both the traditional Japanese style and western styles, such as the gyuto and the santoku. Knives and swords are so integral to the city that it is home to the Seki Cutlery Association, the Seki Swordsmith Museum, the Seki Outdoor Knife Show, the October Cutlery Festival, and the Cutlery Hall. Most manufacturers are small family businesses where craftsmanship is more important than volume, and they typically produce fewer than a dozen knives per day.

== Design and use ==
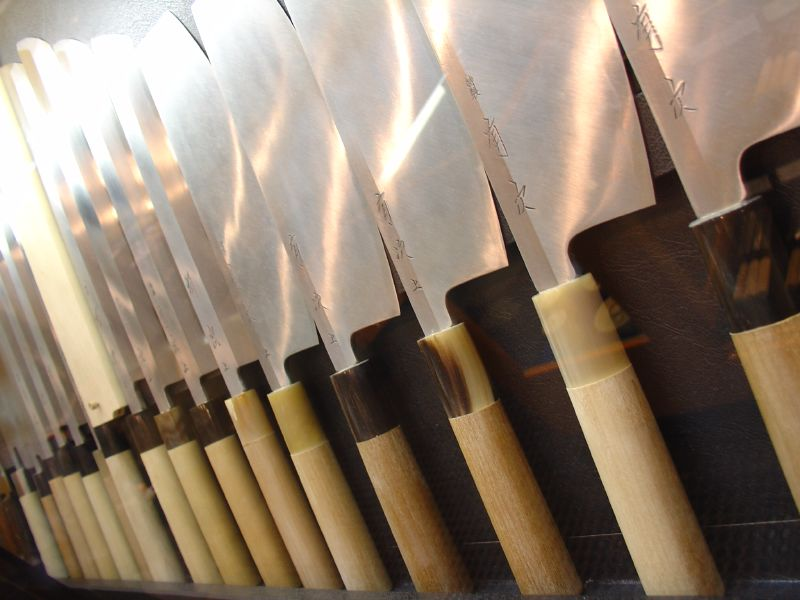
Hōchō is an important element which determines the taste of Japanese cuisine.

Since the end of World War II, western-style, double-beveled knives have gained popularity in Japan. One example of this transition is the santoku, an adaptation of gyoto. Other knives that have become widely used in Japan are the French chef's knife and the sujihiki, roughly analogous to a western carving knife. While these knives are usually sharpened symmetrically on both sides, their blades are still given Japanese-style acute-angle cutting edges of 8-10 degrees per side with a very hard temper to increase cutting ability.

Generally, a typical Japanese kitchen will have at least a basic range of:

- a traditional set of three single-bevelled knives:
  - deba (fish preparation knife)
  - usuba (or else a double-bevelled nakiri — vegetable chopper)
  - yanagi-ba (or else a double-bevelled suji-hiki — slicer)
- a petty knife (kitchen utility / parer)
- a generalist multi-purpose santoku
- a larger generalist gyuto bocho (chef’s knife)
- a single-bevelled hone-suki or a double-bevelled hankotsu (boning knife)

Most professional Japanese cooks own their personal set of knives. After sharpening a carbon-steel knife in the evening after use, the user may let the knife "rest" for a day to restore its patina and remove any metallic odor or taste that might otherwise be passed on to the food. Some cooks choose to own two sets of knives for this reason.

Japanese knives feature subtle variations on the chisel grind. Usually, the back side of the blade (i.e. the left side, for a right-handed user) is concave to reduce drag and adhesion so the food separates more cleanly (this concave feature is known as urasuki). The kanisaki deba, used for cutting crab and other shellfish, has the grind on the opposite side (left side angled for right-handed use), so that the meat is not cut when chopping the shell.

== See also ==
- Kitchen knife
- List of Japanese cooking utensils
- Honyaki
