= Symitar =

Scimitar, Simitar or Symitar may refer to:

- Scimitar, a backsword or sabre with a curved blade, originating in the Middle East
- Simitar Entertainment, a former entertainment company, founded 1985, bankrupt and defunct in 2000
- Symitar, a business unit of Jack Henry & Associates
