= Sashimi bōchō =

Japanese knife for slicing sashimi

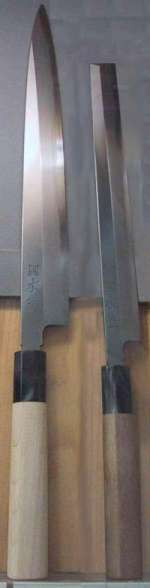
Yanagi-ba (left) and Tako-hiki (right)

(a) Kataba edge for right-hand use; (b) Ryōba double bevel edge; (c) Kataba edge for left-hand use. (The sample knife is a deba bōchō.)

Sashimi bōchō (刺身包丁; lit. 'sashimi knife') is a type of long, thin kitchen knife used in Japanese cuisine to prepare sashimi (sliced raw fish or other seafood). Similar to the nakiri bōchō, the style differs slightly between Tokyo and Osaka. Types of sashimi bōchō include:

- yanagi-ba (柳刃; lit. 'willow blade') from Osaka has a pointed tip.
- tako-hiki (蛸引; lit. 'octopus-puller') from Tokyo is shorter with a square or flat tip and is usually used to prepare octopus and squid.
- fugu-hiki (ふぐ引き; lit. 'pufferfish-puller') is similar to the yanagi-ba, except that the blade is thinner and more flexible. As the name indicates, it is traditionally used to slice very thin fugu pufferfish sashimi and is stored separately from the other knives, due to the very poisonous nature of some of the fish's internal organs, particularly the liver containing high levels of tetrodotoxin.

Following the traditional practice of Japanese kitchen knives, the sashimi bōchō are sharpened with only a single-bevelled edge to the blade, a style known as kataba (片刃; lit. 'one-sided blade'). The highest quality kataba blades have a slight depression—urasuki—on the flat side, which gives better cuts and allows for the cutting of thinner slices than the ryōba (両刃; lit. 'both-sided blade') used for santoku, nakiri, and gyūtō knives, but requires more skill to use. The depression helps keep food from sticking to the blade. The sharpened side is usually the right side for a right-hand use of the knife, but knives sharpened on the left side are available for left-hand use.

The length of the knife is suitable to fillet medium-sized fish and generally is between 25 cm (10 in) and 35 cm (14 in) long. Specialized commercial knives exist for processing larger fish, such as the top quality large blue-fin tuna with knives including the maguro bōchō and oroshi hōchō at almost 2 metres (6.6 feet) long or the slightly shorter hancho hōchō.

== See also ==
- Kitchen knife
- Japanese kitchen knives
  - Chef's knife – gyūtō bōchō
  - Deba bōchō
  - Nakiri bōchō
  - Santoku bōchō
  - Usuba bōchō
- List of Japanese cooking utensils
