= Chef's knife =

Type of kitchen knife

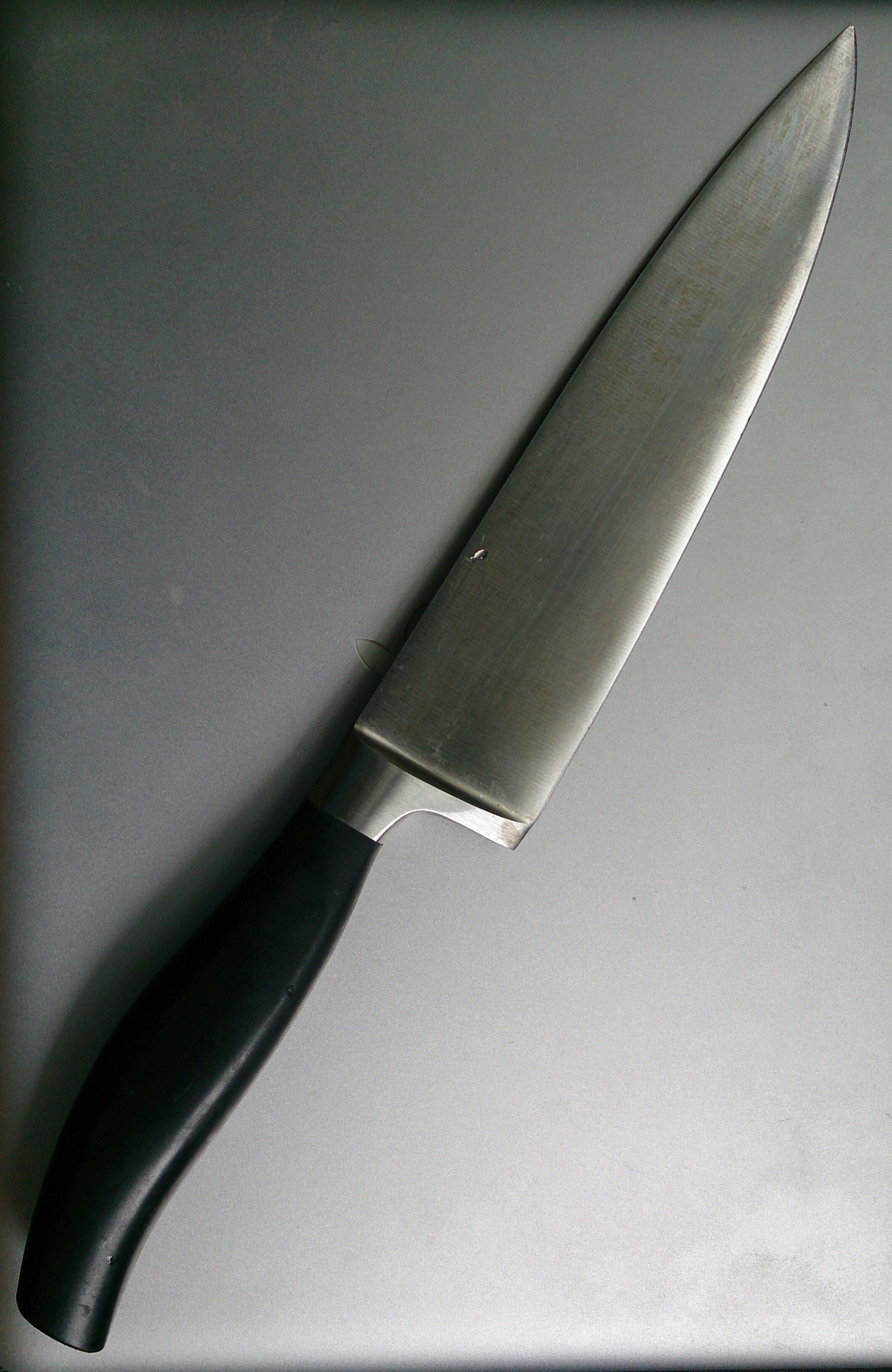
Chef's knife

A chef's knife, also known as a cook's knife, is a medium to large sized generalist kitchen knife used in food preparation. Longer and wider knives are more frequently called chef's knives, whereas shorter and more slender knives have a tendency to be called cook's knives. In cooking, this knife was originally designed primarily to slice and disjoint large cuts of beef and mutton, though now it is the primary general food preparation knife for most Western cooks.

A European chef's knife generally has a blade 20 centimetres (8 inches) in length and a broad 4 cm (1½ in.) width, although individual models range from 15 to 36 centimetres (6 to 14 inches) in length and may be as slender as 2 cm (¾ inch). The shortest and narrowest knives overlap into the general utility kitchen knife category that are too narrow to have a heel and choil to the blade, like the smaller paring knife.

A modern chef's knife is a multi-purpose knife designed to perform well at many differing kitchen tasks, rather than excelling at any one in particular. It can be used for mincing, slicing, and chopping vegetables, slicing meat, and disjointing large cuts.

== Physical characteristics ==
Chef's knives are made with blades that are either forged or stamped:

- Forged: A hand-forged blade is typically of high quality and is made in a multi-step process by highly skilled manual labour. A blank of steel is heated to a high temperature, and hammered to shape and harden the steel. After forging, the blade is ground and sharpened. Forged knives are generally also full-tang, meaning the metal in the knife runs from the tip of the knifepoint to the far end of the handle. Commercially made forged knives are struck in a power hammer to produce features such as the bolster.
- Stamped: A stamped blade and cut to shape directly from cold rolled steel, annealed to be worked, tempered for toughness, and heat-treated for strength. It is then ground, sharpened, and polished. This is typical of cheaper, machined, mass-produced knives, but with refined and more detailed processes more frequently high quality knives are made this way, as well.

The blade of a chef's knife is typically made of carbon steel, stainless steel, or a laminate or folded sandwich of both metals, otherwise it will be a glass-like ceramic:

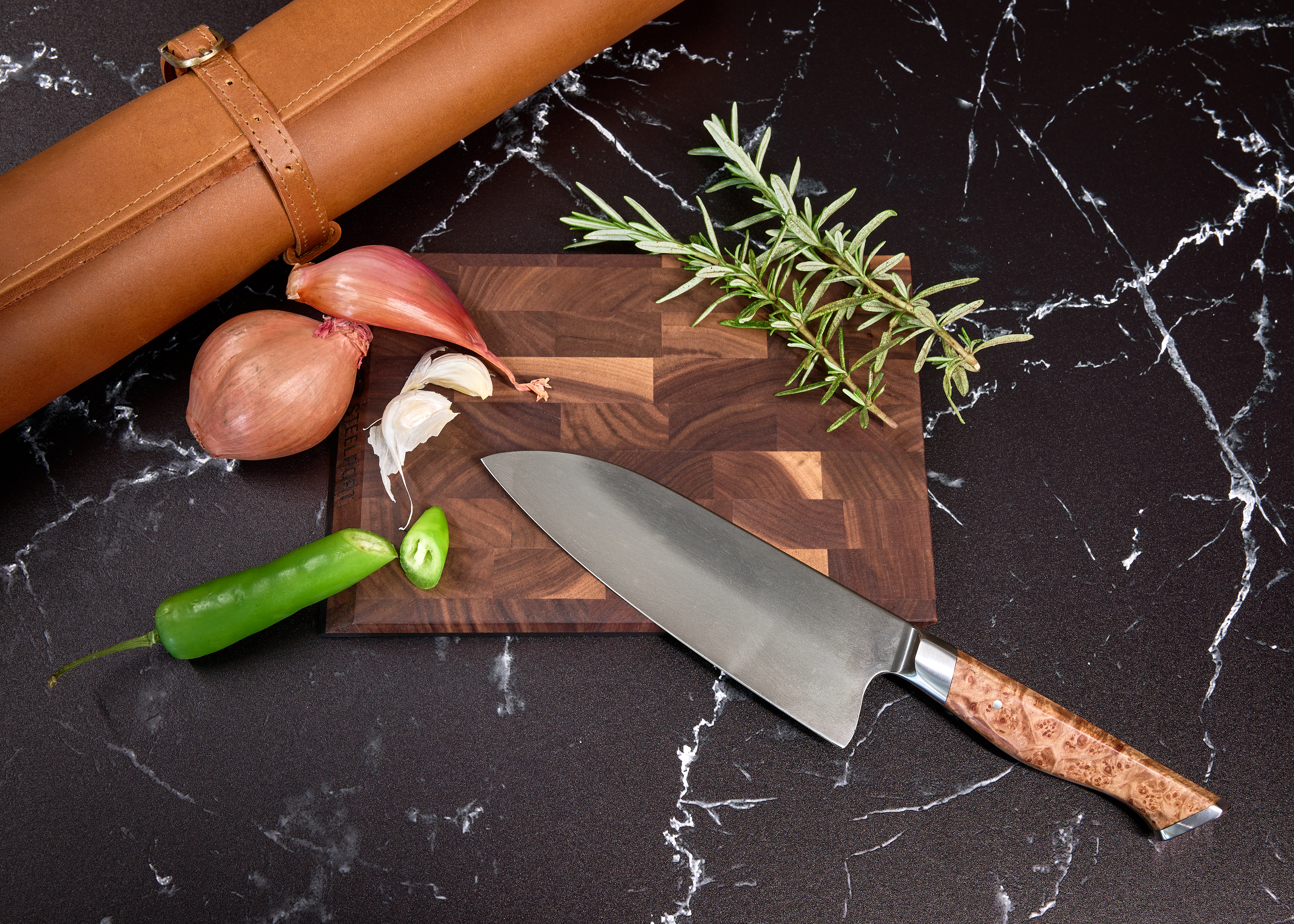
6-inch hand-forged carbon steel chef knife

- Carbon steel: An alloy of iron and approximately 1% carbon. Most carbon steel chef's knives are simple carbon iron alloys without exotic additions such as chromium or vanadium. Carbon steel blades are both easier to sharpen than ordinary stainless steel and usually hold an edge longer, but are vulnerable to rust and stains. Some professional cooks swear by knives of carbon steel because of their sharpness. Over time, a carbon-steel knife will normally acquire a dark patina, and can rust or corrode if not cared for properly by cleaning and lubricating the blade after use. Some chefs also 'rest' their carbon-steel knives for a day after use in order to restore the oxidizing patina, which prevents transfer of metallic tastes to some foods. While some cooks prefer and use carbon steel knives (especially in Asia and the Middle East), others find carbon steel too maintenance-intensive in a kitchen environment.
- Stainless steel: An alloy of iron, approximately 10–15% of chromium, nickel, and/or molybdenum, with less than 1% of carbon. Lower grades of stainless steel cannot take as sharp an edge as good-quality high-carbon steels, but are resistant to corrosion, and are inexpensive. The addition of other alloy materials — such as manganese, niobium, and vanadium — to improve hardness with ability to form and keep a sharp edge, so can substitute the need for carbon, but this can make the steel harder to work and typically cost more. Pioneered in Japan, higher grade stainless steels with the addition of other alloys: cobalt, vanadium, and tungsten, (sometimes as a carbide), produced with a very fine grained structure — as in the VG series culminating with VG-10 manufactured by Takefu Special Steels — resulting in extremely sharp blades with excellent edge retention, and equal or outperform carbon steel blades.
- Laminated steel: developed from high quality blade using steels of differing tempers — tough and flexible versus hard but brittle — as seen in san-mai steel blades either folded together many times over giving a Damascus steel blade or forge-welded together with the hard steel for the edge and tough steels for the spine and flats of the blade. A laminated knife tries to use the best of each material within this layered sandwich of different materials, with the softer-but-tough steel as the backing material for the general blade resilience and a sharper/harder — but more brittle — steel as the edge material.
- Ceramic blades hold an edge the longest of all, but they chip easily and may break if dropped. They also require special equipment and expertise to resharpen. They are sintered to shape with zirconium oxide powder. They are chemically non-reactive, so will not discolour or taint / change the taste of food.

Handles are made of wood, steel, or synthetic/composite materials.

=== Edge ===
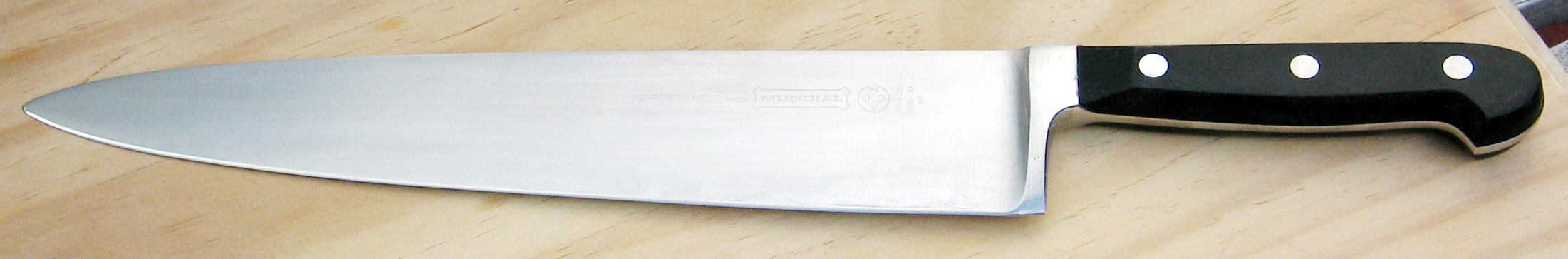
A German-style of chef's knife with arrowhead triangular tip

The edge may be ground in different ways:

- a double or compound grind, V-shape, with either a single or double bevel
- a convex grind
- a hollow grind with a concave edge
- a single grind or chisel edge — resulting in a 'handed' knife, in most cases ground for right-handed cooks — typical in Japanese knives, termed kataba, but rare in European ones.

In order to improve the chef's knife's multi-purpose abilities, some users employ differential sharpening along the length of the blade. The fine tip, used for precision work such as mincing, might be ground with a very sharp, acute cutting bevel; the midsection or belly of the blade receives a moderately sharp edge for general cutting, chopping and slicing, while the heavy heel or back of the cutting edge is given a strong, thick edge for heavy-duty tasks, for example disjointing beef. This differential sharpening suits European chef's knives with the heavy heel of the blade at the base at the bolster.

== Variation ==
There are two common types of blade shape in Western chef's knives: French and German.

- French-style knives are not symmetrical and have an edge that is straighter, until the end and then curves strongly up to the tip — known as the "French tip". This centuries old asymmetric style of blade form is synonymous with the renowned Occitan French Laguiole knives, of the old "knife city" of Thiers in the Auvergne, and Opinel knives, of Savoy — the Laguiole is the template for the modern steak knife.
- German-style knives are more deeply and continuously, but gently curved equally along the whole cutting edge and the spine — a symmetric elongated triangular arrowhead.

Japanese kitchen knives differ from the European style as the latter typically have a thickened heel at the base of the blade where it meets the handle at the bolster. This heel is often shaped into the handle's form at the bolster. This can clearly be seen in the photograph above. The handle is typically bi-laterally flatted to allow for it to be rivetted together through the tang, whereas the oriental style typically has an off-circular cross-section. In Japanese kitchen knives, the blade and tang has little difference in thickness throughout it length, except at the tip when sharpened - there is no bolster - it is inserted into the handle with a separate collar to hold the assembled knife together.

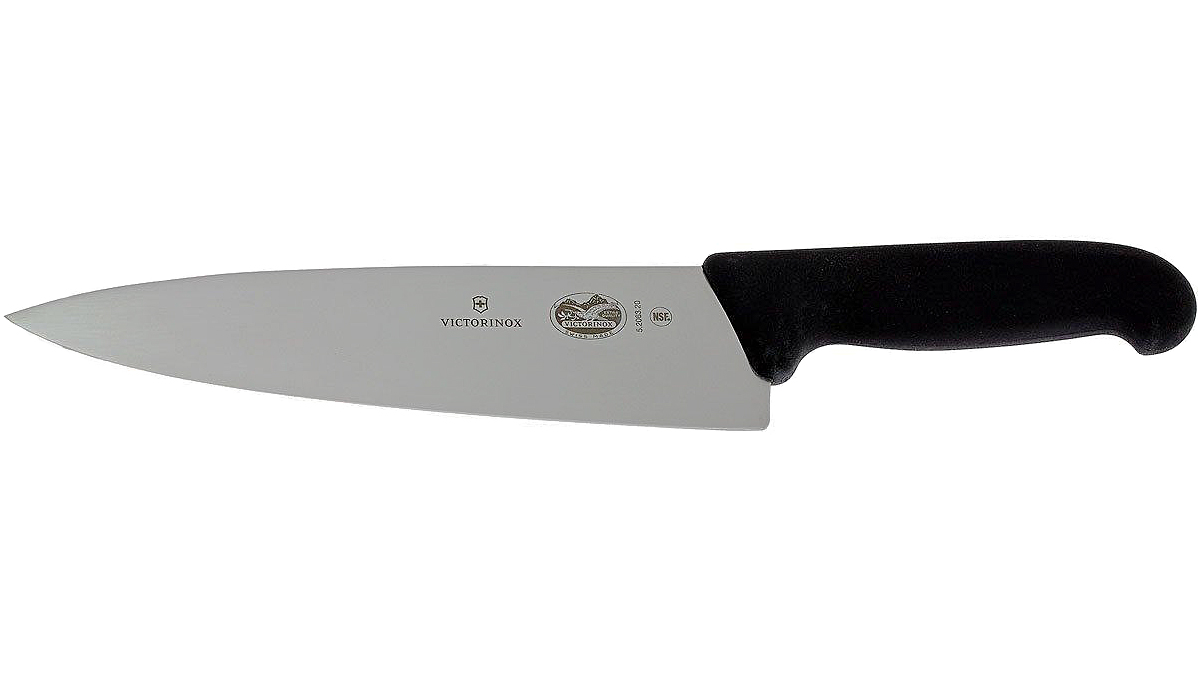
NSF-certified stamped x50CrMov15 stainless steel chef's knife with TPE grip

With modern kitchen knives, these distinct styles have merged to a degree and particular characteristics have been swapped between the two regions, as can be seen in the adjacent photograph of the NSF kitchen knife.

Japanese kitchen knives have come under Western influence since the Meiji era, and many hybrid versions are available. The gyūtō bōchō (牛刀 ぎゅうとう, — gyūtō) 'beef knife' is the Japanese term for a French (or Western) chef's knife. The gyuto were originally, and sometimes still called yo-boucho 洋包丁 literally meaning "Western chef's knife".

The santoku 'three-virtue' knife is a style hybridized with traditional knives for more functionality. It is smaller, lighter and sharper with a different blade shape.

The Chinese chef's knife is completely different and resembles a cleaver. It is, however, functionally analogous to the Western chef's knife in that it's a general-purpose knife not designed for breaking bones.

== Technique ==
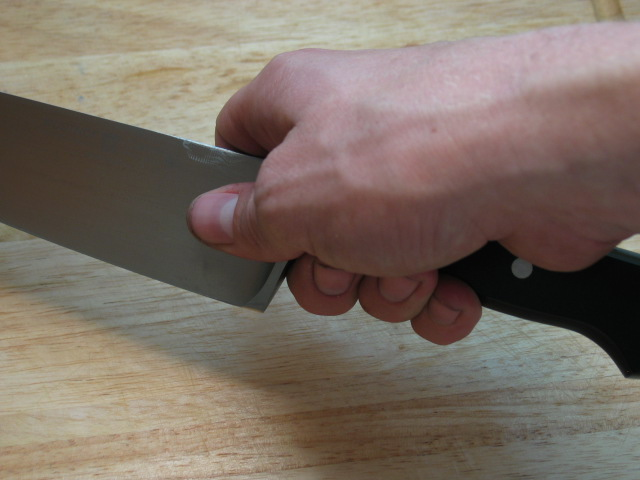
Holding a knife by its bolster

Technique for the use of a chef's knife depends on how well the knife is balanced as well as an individual stylistic preference. For more precise control, especially with longer heavier knives, most cooks prefer to grip the blade itself, with the thumb and the index finger grasping the blade just to the front of the finger guard and the middle finger placed just opposite, on the handle side of the finger guard below the bolster. This is commonly referred to as a 'pinch grip'. Those without culinary training often grip the handle, with all four fingers and the thumb gathered underneath.

One technique for slicing is to cut from the back or far side of the food with the heel of the knife and then draw the length of the blade across and down till the tip reaches the front or near side on the chopping board, all in one fluid motion.

Another technique for fine slicing is to hold the food being cut with one hand and to run the flat of the blade along the knuckles, utilising them as a guide. This enables the efficient use of both the curvature and the length of the blade's edge to execute the cut.

For chopping and mincing, is to keep the tip in contact with the chopping board, as a pivot, then cutting down and raising up the handle, while pushing the cut object through under the blade.

== See also ==
- Kitchen knife
  - Chinese chef's knife
  - Japanese kitchen knife
  - Deba bōchō
  - Nakiri bōchō
  - Santoku bōchō
  - Sashimi bōchō
  - Usuba bōchō
- List of Japanese cooking utensils
