= Deba bōchō =

Japanese kitchen knives

A traditional deba bōchō with a standard 165 mm (6.5 in) blade

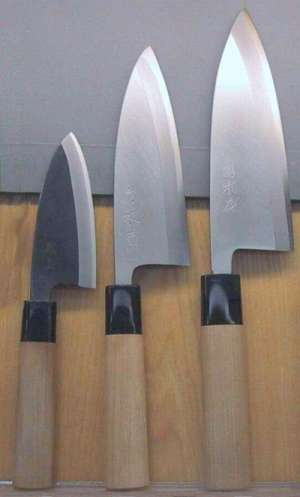
Deba bōchō of different sizes ranging from a ko-deba (left) to a hon-deba (right)

Deba bōchō (Japanese: 出刃包丁) − "fish-preparer" − are a style of Japanese kitchen knives primarily used to cut fish, though are also used occasionally in preparing meat. Deba have wide blades and are the thickest of all Japanese kitchen knives and come in different sizes − sometimes up to 30 centimetres (12 inches) in length and 10 millimetres (0.4 inches) thick − but usually considerably shorter, normally between 12 and 20 cm (5 and 8 in) long with a blade between 5 and 7 mm (0.2 and 0.3 in) thick. The larger form of knife is called an hon-deba, ("true deba") whereas the smaller form is a ko-deba.

== History ==
(a) Kataba edge for right-hand use – (b) ryōba double bevel edge for use in either hand – (c) kataba edge for left-hand use. (The sample knife is a deba bōchō)

The deba bōchō first appeared during the Edo period in Sakai. Following the traditions of Japanese knives, they have just a single bevel to the edge − with an urasuki hollow back on premium blades − so usually come in right-handed versions, but left-handed ones can be found in specialist shops.

Generally, the deba is one of a trio single-bevelled Japanese kitchen knives forming a basic range essential to washoku — 和食 — "Japanese cuisine":

- deba − a broad and short fish preparation knife
- usuba bōchō − a wide vegetable chopper − or else a double-bevelled nakiri bōchō
- yanagi ba − a long and thin fish slicer (for sashimi) − or else a double-bevelled suji-hiki

Unlike most other Japanese kitchen knives under the influence of European cutlers, there is not a double-bevelled version of the deba. The closest would be a gyūtō bōchō − a "beef knife". In the 1940s, the santoku was created and named for combining the "three virtues" of the deba, the nakiri, and the gyūtō bōchō in one knife, which has a double bevel.

It is designed to behead and fillet fish. The thickness of a deba, with often a more obtuse angle on the back of the heel, allow it to cut off the heads of fish without damage. The rest of the blade is then used to ride against the fish bones, separating the fillet.

The deba is sometimes used in the preparation of meat, it not intended for chopping heavy, large diameter bones of beef, lamb, or pork.

== Construction materials and maintenance ==
Traditionally, deba knives are made of carbon steel, which needs regular maintenance and oiling to prevent rust. However, many modern knives are also available in stainless steel. Typically, but not always, carbon steel blades can be honed into a sharper cutting edge.

High quality knives will have a san mai laminated steel blade construction with more durable, robust, and pliant outer layers of usually stainless steel around a core of extremely hard steel that is able to take and hold a fine sharp edge. Another technique is to use steels of differing hardness and resilience and folding them in the forging process to form a damask steel blade.

The handle is traditionally made of ho wood, which is burned in and friction-fitted to a hidden tang that does not run the full handle length. The wood is porous and fine-grained, which makes it less likely to split and retain its grip. A metal collar or buffalo horn bolster caps the handle-blade junction and further reduces the possibility splitting. This allows easy installation and replacement.

== See also ==
- Kitchen knife
- Japanese kitchen knife
  - Chef's knife – gyūtō bōchō
  - Nakiri bōchō
  - Santoku bōchō
  - Sashimi bōchō
  - Usuba bōchō
- List of Japanese cooking utensils
