= Japanese saw =

Cutting tool

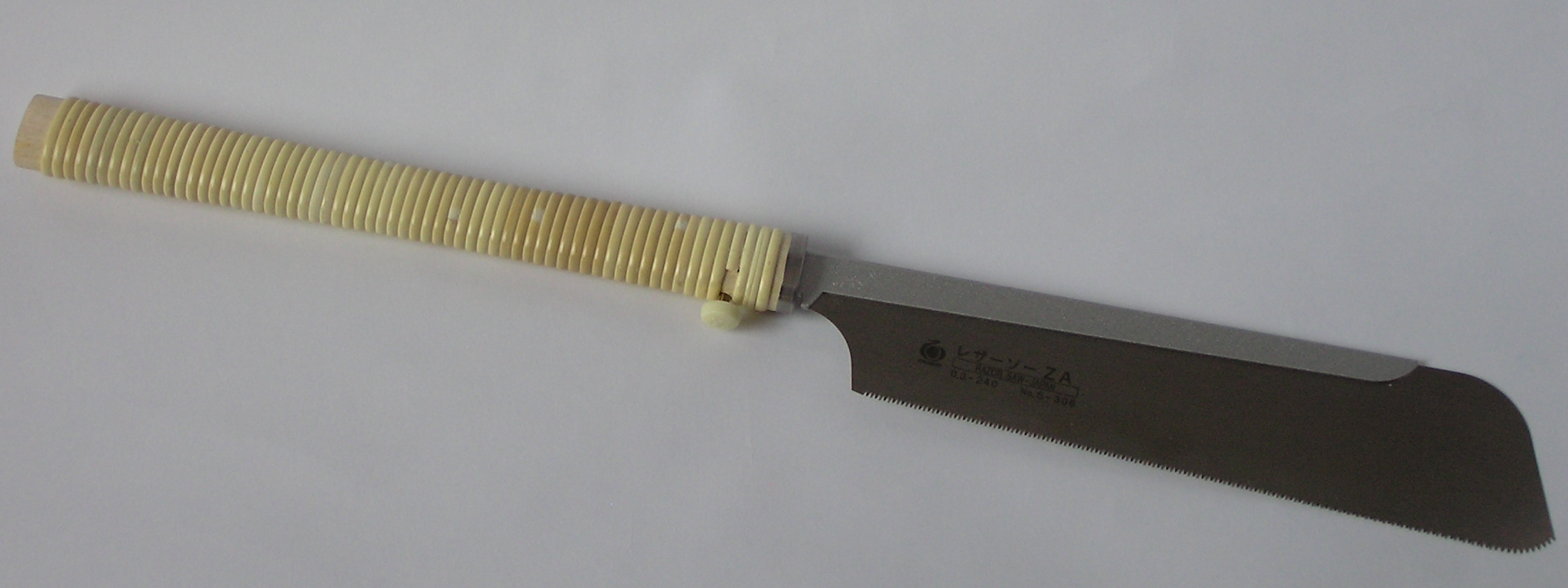
A dozuki.

The Japanese saw or nokogiri (鋸) is a type of saw used in woodworking and Japanese carpentry that cuts on the pull stroke, unlike most European saws, that cut on the push stroke. The popularity of Japanese saws in other regions of the world has resulted in the manufacture and production of a number of Japanese saws outside of Japan.

== Cutting method ==
Cutting on the pull stroke is claimed to cut more efficiently. The blades are often thinner than traditional western saws that cut on the push stroke. The thinner blades can leave a narrower cut width (kerf). The original arrangement and form of the teeth made Japanese pull saws less suitable for hardwoods than push saws. Japanese saws were originally intended for comparatively soft woods such as cypress and pine, whereas European saws were intended for hard woods such as oak and maple. Modern pull saws, especially those with a reinforced steel support along the spine of the saw are efficient hardwood saws.

Japanese saws are the best-known pull saws, but pull saws are also used in China, Iran, Iraq, Korea, Nepal, and Turkey. Among European saws, both coping saws for woodworking and jeweler's saws for metalworking cut on the pull stroke like Japanese saws.

== Types of Japanese hand saws ==
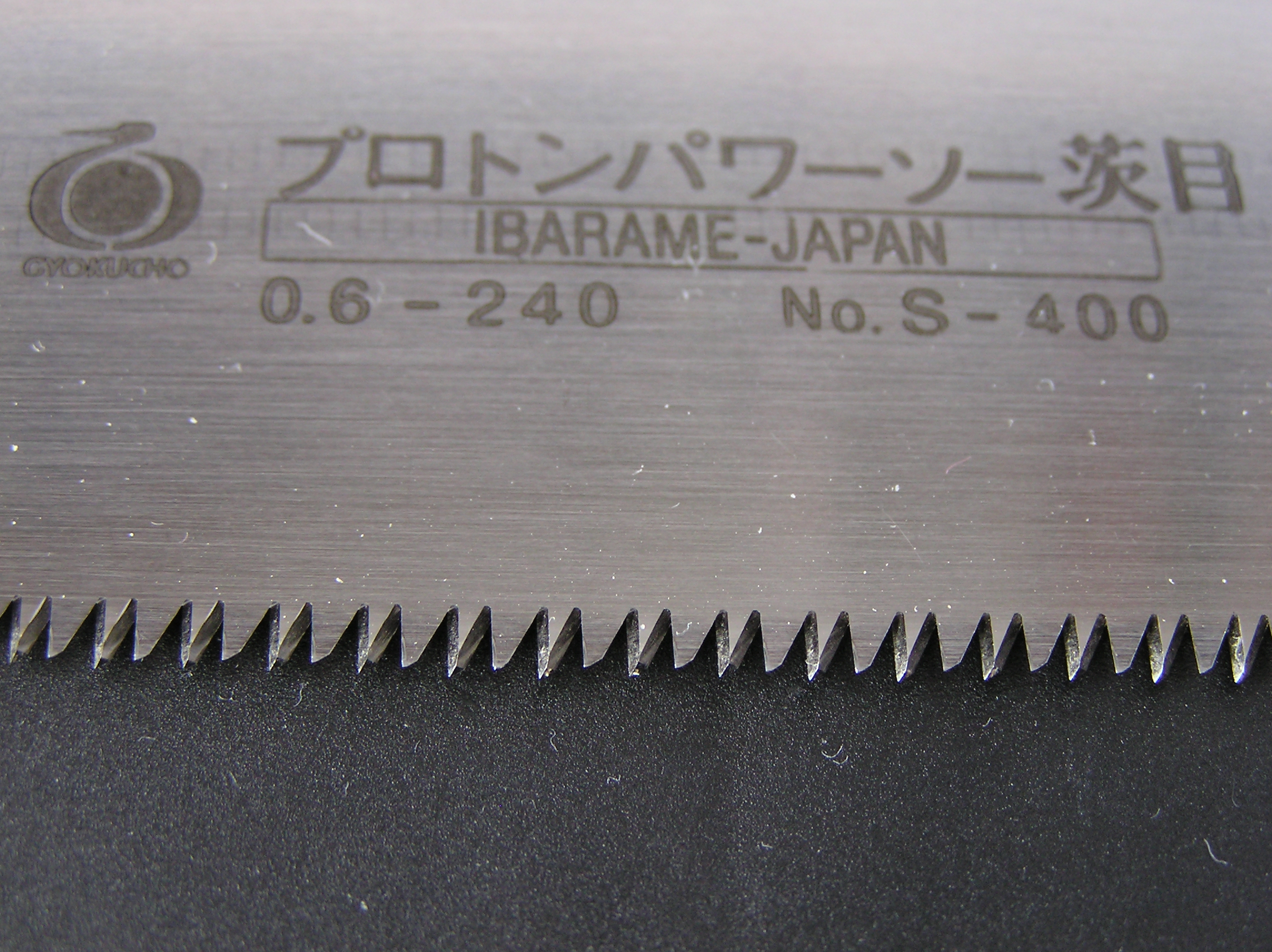
A detail of the crosscut teeth of a dozuki saw.

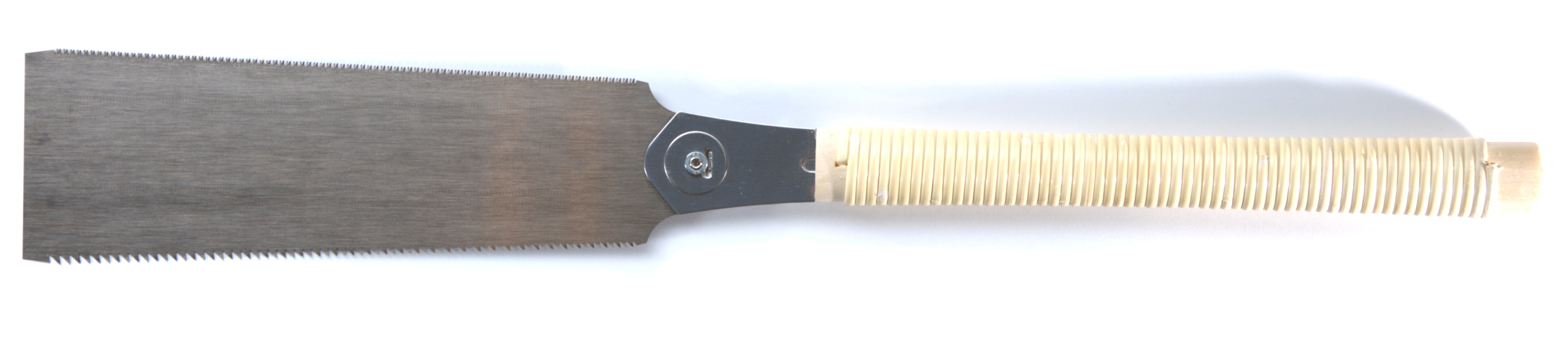
A Ryoba with two cutting edges

Douzukinoko (胴付鋸、胴突鋸)
A type of backsaw. The Japanese means "attached trunk", thus a saw with a stiffening strip attached, i.e., a backsaw. Although similar to a Western backsaw, a Dozuki saw has a much thinner blade that excels at precise cutting. Dozuki saws are designed for cutting tenons and dovetails, types of woodworking joints, also referred to as joinery.
Ryoba (両刃)
Multi-purpose carpentry saw with two cutting edges. The Japanese means "double blade". There is a cross-cutting (yokobiki) 横挽き blade on one side and a ripping (tatebiki )縦挽き blade on the other. Ryoba saws are often described by their blade length (in millimeters). Shorter saws, around 240 millimetres (9 1/2 in) for example, are for general carpentry. A longer saw, around 270 millimetres (10 3/4 in), would be suitable for larger work, like timber-frame joinery, for example.
Kataba (片刃)
A saw with teeth along only one edge, like a Western saw. These are supplied as either rip saw or cross-cut type blades. An advantage of this saw is that it is easy to use with a saw guide. "Kataba" translates from Japanese as "cutting on one side." Kataba saws are commonly used for larger work when a Ryoba saw is not suitable, or for flush-cutting.
Azebiki (畦挽、あぜびき)
A small ryōba saw used for cutting into the flat surface of a board rather than from the edge. The blade has a convex curve which can begin the cut anywhere on the surface. Azebiki saws are used for cutting mortises, grooves in mid-panel and sliding dovetails.
Mawashibiki (回し引き)
A thin saw used for cutting curves, the Japanese version of a keyhole saw. The name means "turning cut".
Kugihiki
A thin flexible flush-cut saw with unset teeth on one side, designed for trimming the ends of dowels, tenons, and other protrusions flush with a surface.

== Other Japanese saws ==
Oga
A large two-person pit saw used for ripping large boards in the days before power saws. One person stood on a raised platform, with the board below him, and the other person stood underneath them.

== See also ==
- Japanese carpentry
