= Cimeter =

Large, curved butcher's knife

A cimeter or scimitar is a large, curved butcher's knife, with a blade typically between 20 cm (8 in) and 35 cm (14 in) long. It is used primarily for cutting large pieces of meat into retail cuts such as steaks. These knives are available with or without a granton fluted blade.

== Etymology ==
'Cimeter' is a formerly common variant spelling of 'scimitar', a kind of curved sword. The spelling 'cimeter' has become standard for the knife. In The Book of Mormon, the term "cimeter" is used often to describe a weapon of war.
