= Santoku =

Kitchen knife originating in Japan

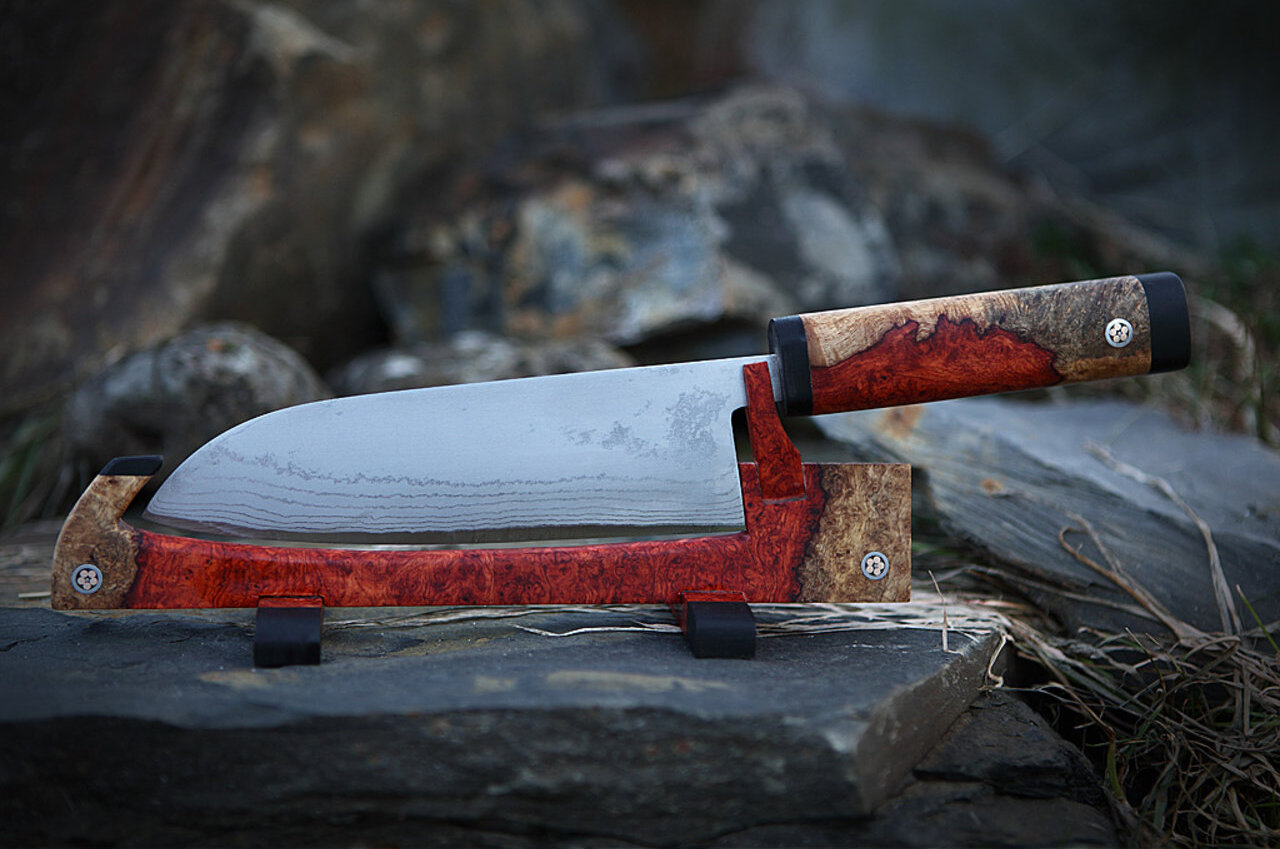
A traditional-handled Japanese santoku knife

A santoku (left) in comparison to a bunka bōchō (right) showing the differing tips, with both having traditional Japanese octagonal cross-section handles

The santoku bōchō (Japanese: 三徳包丁; lit. '"three virtues knife" or "three uses knife"') or bunka bōchō (文化包丁) is a general-purpose kitchen knife originating in Japan. Its blade is typically between 13 and 20 centimetres (5 and 8 inches) long, and has a flat edge. The santoku has a sheep's foot-tipped blade that curves down an angle approaching 60 degrees at the point. The bunka bōchō, however, has a more angular, straight tip. The term santoku may refer to the wide variety of ingredients that the knife can handle: fish, meat, and vegetables, or to the tasks it can perform: chopping, dicing, and slicing, with either interpretation indicating a multi-use, general-purpose kitchen knife. The term bunka refers to how it is used for the cultural food of Japan. The blade and handle of the santoku are designed to work in harmony by matching the blade's width and weight to the weight of the tang and the handle.

== History ==
The santoku knife design originated in Japan, where traditionally a deba knife is used to cut fish, a gyūtō knife is used to cut meat, and a nakiri knife is used to cut vegetables. This knife was created in the 1940s to combine the three virtues of each of these traditional knives into one universal generalist knife − the santoku bōchō.

== Design ==
Schematic diagram of a santoku bōchō

Schematic diagram of 3 bunka bōchō variations (from top to bottom): kengata, hakata, ko-bunka

Santoku blade geometry incorporates the sheep's foot tip. A sheep's foot design essentially draws the spine ('backstrap') down to the front, with very little clearance above the horizontal cutting plane when the blade is resting naturally from heel to forward cutting edge. Providing a more linear cutting edge, the santoku has limited 'rocking' travel (in comparison to a European-style chef's knife). The santoku may be used in a rocking motion; however, very little cutting edge makes contact with the surface due to the extreme radius of the tip and very little 'tip travel' occurs due to the short cantilever span from contact landing to tip. An example of this limitation can be demonstrated in dicing an onion − a European knife generally slices downward and then rocks the tip forward to complete a cut; whereas the santoku relies more on a single downward cut and even landing from heel to tip, thus using less of a rocking motion.

The santoku design is shorter, thinner, and so lighter, with more hardened steel in the tradition of Samurai sword steel (to compensate for thinness) than a traditional European chef's knife. Standard santoku blade length is between 15 and 18 cm (6 and 7 in), in comparison to the typical 20 cm (8 in) European cook's knife. Most classic kitchen knives maintain a blade angle between 40° and 45° (a bilateral 20° to 22½° shoulder, from cutting edge).

Japanese knives typically incorporate a kataba chisel-edge (sharpened on one side), and maintain a more extreme angle (10° to 15° shoulder). A classic santoku, rather, incorporates the European-style, bilateral cutting edge, but maintain a more extreme 12° to 15° shoulder, akin to Japanese cutlery. It is critical to increase the hardness of santoku steel so edge retention is maintained and 'rolling' of the thin cutting edge is mitigated. However, harder, thinner steel is more likely to chip, when pushing against a bone for example. German knives use slightly 'softer' steel, but have more material behind their cutting edge. For the average user, a European-style knife is easier to sharpen, but a santoku knife, if used as designed, will hold its edge longer.

== Variations ==
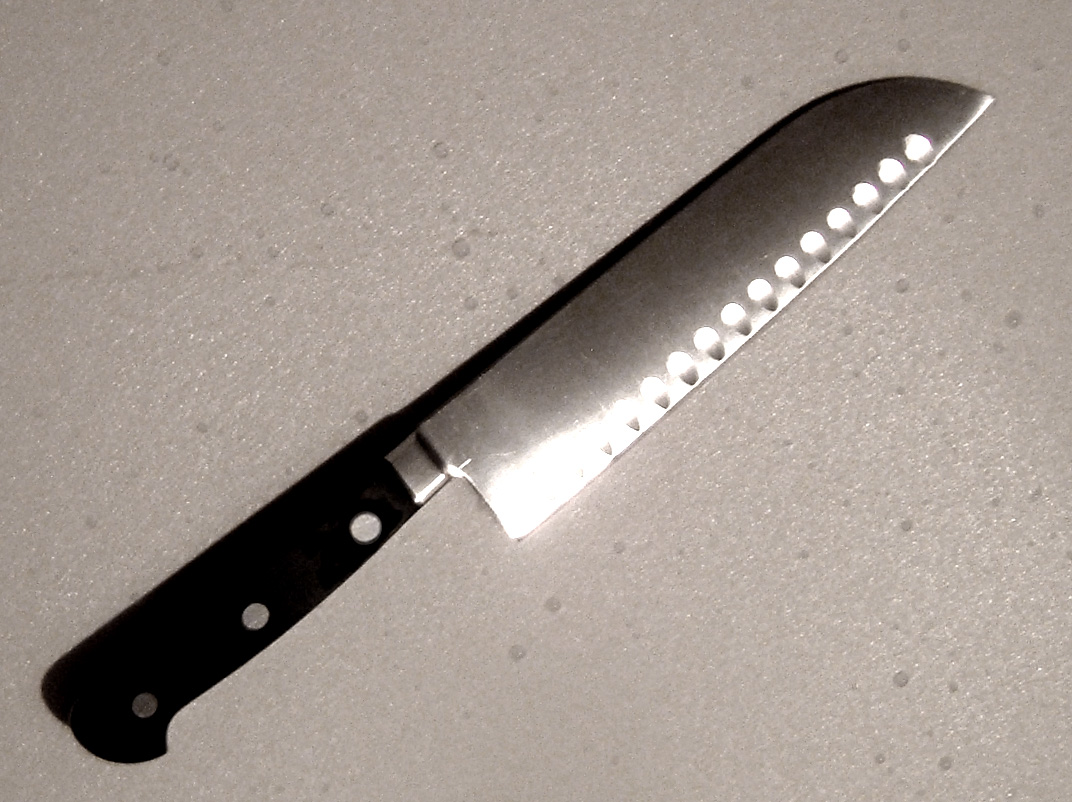
A European-style santoku knife with a Granton edge (fluted blade)

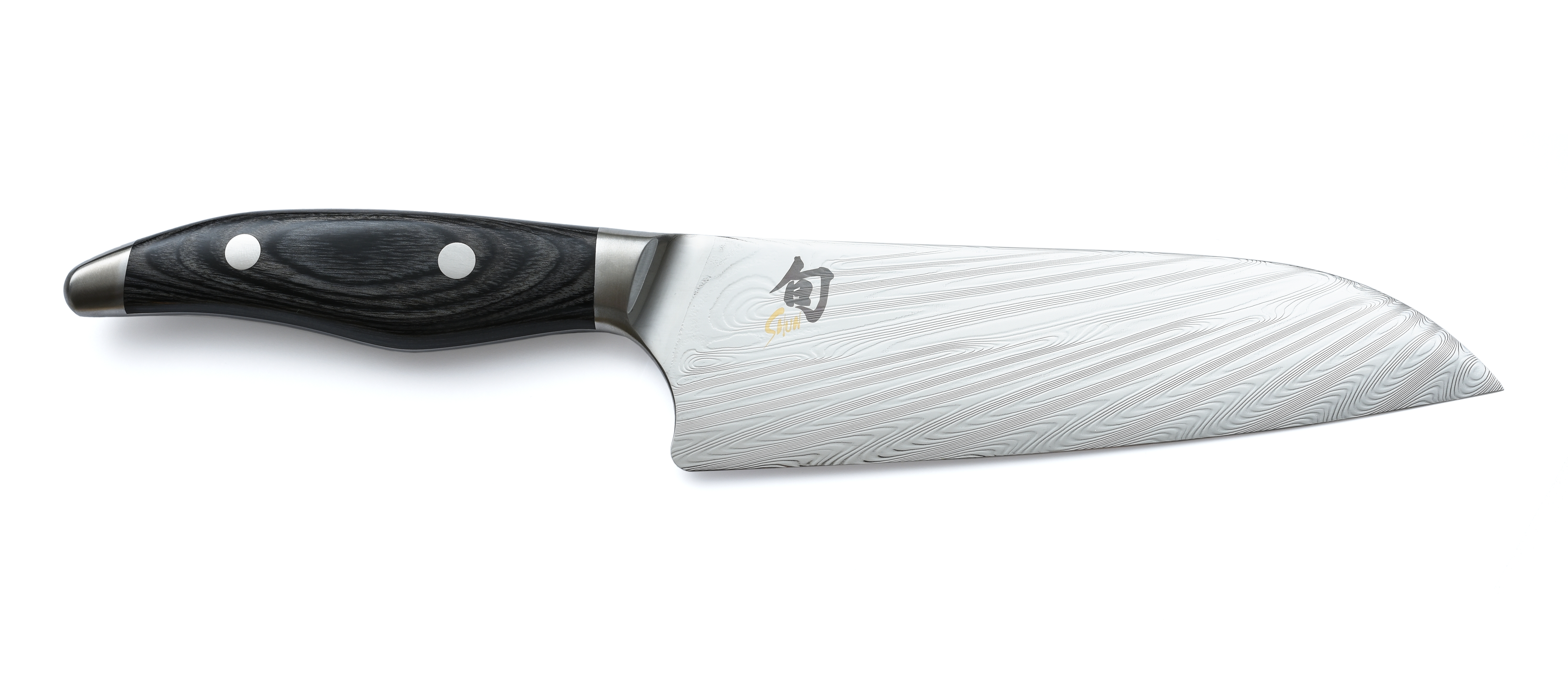
A modern merged Japanese santoku with a Damascus steel blade on a bolstered and rivetted European-style handle

Some of the knives employ san mai (or 'three layered') laminated steels, including the pattern known as suminagashi (墨流し, lit. 'flowing-ink'). The term refers to the similarity of the pattern formed by the blade's damascened and multi-layer steel alloys to the traditional Japanese art of suminagashi marbled paper. Forged laminated stainless steel cladding is employed on higher quality Japanese santoku knives to improve strength and rust resistance while maintaining a hard edge. Knives possessing these laminated blades are generally much more expensive to match the higher quality.

There are many copies of santoku-pattern knives made outside Japan that have substantially different edge designs, different balance, and different steels from the original Japanese santoku. One trend in santoku copies made of a single alloy is to include fluting or recesses, also known as a Granton edge, hollowed out of the side of the blade, similar to those found in meat-carving knives. This fluting creates small air pockets between the blade and the material being sliced in an attempt to reduce cutting friction, improve separation, and maintain a more uniform thickness from spine to blade edge, (an example is shown above).

With few exceptions, Japanese knives do not have a bolster, but santoku knives typically have a cross-over appeal with Western market for kitchen knives leading to variants with handles in the European style incorporating a full-length tang with a bolster between the handle and blade, as seen in these last two images.

== See also ==
- Japanese kitchen knives
  - Chef's knife — gyūtō bōchō
  - Deba bōchō
  - Nakiri bōchō
  - Sashimi bōchō
  - Usuba bōchō
- Cimeter
- Kitchen knife indentation
- List of Japanese cooking utensils
