= Fuller (surname) =

Fuller is a surname. It originally referred to someone who treats woolen cloth with the process called fulling (a process also known as walking—or waulking in Scotland—and tucking, hence the names Walker and Tucker). Notable people with the surname include:

== Acting ==
- Alfie Fuller, American actress
- Barbra Fuller (1922–2024), American actress
- Dolores Fuller (1923–2011), American actress and composer, Ed Wood's companion
- Drew Fuller (born 1980), American actor
- Frances Fuller (1907–1980), American actress
- Kurt Fuller (born 1953), American actor
- Mary Fuller (1888–1973), American actress
- Penny Fuller, American actress
- Robert Fuller (actor) (born 1933), American actor

== Architecture ==
- Buckminster Fuller (1895–1983), American architect
- George A. Fuller (1851–1900), American architect and general contractor, "inventor" of modern skyscrapers
- H. E. Fuller (1867–1962), South Australian architect, artist and art critic
- Thomas Fuller (architect) (1823–1898), Canadian architect
- Thomas W. Fuller (1865–1951), Canadian architect, son of Thomas Fuller

== Art ==
- George Fuller (painter) (1822–1884), American figure and portrait painter
- Isaac Fuller (1606?–1672), English painter
- Meta Vaux Warrick Fuller (1867–1968), American artist
- Ron Fuller (artist) (1936–2017), British artist
- Victoria Fuller (artist) (born 1953), American artist and sculptor
- Violet Fuller (1920–2006), British artist

== Business ==
- Alfred Fuller (1885–1973), Canadian businessman
- George F. Fuller (1869–1962), American industrialist
- Kathryn S. Fuller, American lawyer and business executive
- Samuel Augustus Fuller (1837–1891), American steel industry executive
- Samuel B. Fuller (1905–1988), American entrepreneur

== Film and television ==
- Ben Fuller (producer) (1875–1952), English theatre entrepreneur in Australia
- Brad Fuller (producer) (born 1965), American filmmaker
- Chris Fuller (born 1982), American filmmaker
- Courtis Fuller (born 1957), American broadcaster
- Samuel Fuller (1911–1997), American movie director
- Simon Fuller (born 1960), British record and television producer

== Medicine ==
- Samuel Fuller (Pilgrim) (c. 1580–1633), English doctor, a founder of the colony at Plymouth, Massachusetts
- Thomas Fuller (writer) (1654–1734), English physician and collector of adages in his Gnomologia

== Military ==
- Aaron Fuller (military) (1738–1816), American military officer
- Ben Hebard Fuller (1870–1937), American general and 15th Commandant of the Marine Corps
- Edward Fuller (U.S. Marine Corps officer) (1893–1918), American officer and son of Ben Hebard Fuller
- Horace H. Fuller (1886–1966), American soldier
- J. F. C. Fuller (1878–1966), British general and military historian
- John W. Fuller (1827–1891), American general
- Thomas G. Fuller (1908–1994), Canadian captain in the Royal Canadian Naval Volunteer Reserve; recipient of a Distinguished Service Cross and two bars in the Second World War, and whose company constructed several landmark buildings in Ottawa
- Wilfred Fuller (1893–1947), British soldier
- Stephen Fuller (1900–1984), Irish Fianna Fáil politician and former member of the Kilflynn IRA Flying column

== Music ==
- Aidan Fuller (born 2003), known as 347aidan, Canadian rapper
- Ben Fuller (singer) (born 1987), American contemporary Christian singer-songwriter
- Blind Boy Fuller (born Fulton Allen; 1904–1941), American blues guitarist and singer
- Bobby Fuller (1942–1966), American rock singer and guitarist
- Curtis Fuller (1932–2021), American jazz trombonist
- Jesse Fuller (1896–1976), American one-man-band musician
- Jim Fuller (musician) (1947–2017), American guitarist with The Surfaris
- Johnny Fuller (musician) (1929–1985), American blues singer and guitarist
- Joni Fuller (born 1991), British musician
- Nathan Fuller (born 2004), known as 1nonly, Korean-American rapper
- Rachel Fuller (born 1973), British musician

== Politics and law ==
- Allen C. Fuller (1822–1901), Attorney General of Illinois during the American Civil War
- Alvan T. Fuller (1878–1958), American politician from Massachusetts, father of Peter D. Fuller
- Beth Fuller, American politician
- Charles Eugene Fuller (1849–1926), American congressman for Illinois
- Claude A. Fuller (1876–1968), American congressman for Arkansas
- Clay Fuller (born 1981), American congressman for Georgia
- David Fuller (politician) (1941–2022), American politician, Montana state senator
- DuFay A. Fuller (1852–1924), American businessman and politician in Illinois, brother of Charles Eugene Fuller
- George Fuller (Australian politician) (1861–1940), twice Premier of New South Wales, Australia
- George Fuller (British politician) (1833–1927), British Liberal politician
- George Fuller (congressman) (1802–1888), American congressman for Pennsylvania
- Lon L. Fuller (1902–1978), American legal philosopher
- Mad Jack Fuller (1757–1834), English politician, philanthropist and patron of the arts
- Melville Fuller (1833–1910), eighth Chief Justice of the United States
- Oramel B. Fuller (1858–1935), American politician in Michigan
- Richard Fuller (Bedford MP) (born 1962), British politician

== Religion ==
- Andrew Fuller (1754–1815), British Baptist minister
- Charles E. Fuller (Baptist minister) (1887–1968), American preacher and founder of Fuller Theological Seminary
- George C. Fuller (1932–2021), American theologian and seminary president
- John Fuller (college head) (died 1558), Master of Jesus College, Cambridge (1557–1558)
- Peter the Fuller, Patriarch of Antioch
- Reginald C. Fuller (1908–2011), British priest and biblical scholar
- Thomas Fuller (1608–1661), English cleric and historian, author of Worthies of England

== Science and technology ==
- Alison Fuller, British educational researcher
- A. W. F. Fuller (1882–1951), British anthropologist
- Calvin Fuller (1902–1994), American physical chemist, inventor of the solar cell
- Claude Fuller (entomologist) (1872–1928), Australian-born entomologist in South Africa
- Edgar Fuller, American mathematician
- George M. Fuller (born 1953), American physicist
- George W. Fuller (1868–1934), sanitary engineer
- Gerald Fuller (born 1953), American chemical engineer

== Sports ==
=== Baseball ===
- Dave Fuller (1915–2009), American college baseball coach
- Ed Fuller (1869–1935), American baseball pitcher
- Frank Fuller (baseball) (1893–1965), American baseball player
- Harry Fuller (baseball) (1862–1895), American baseball player, brother of Shorty Fuller
- Jim Fuller (outfielder) (born 1950), American baseball player
- Jimmy Fuller (1892–1987), American baseball player in the Negro leagues
- John Fuller (born 1950), American baseball player
- Nig Fuller (born Charles F. Furrer; 1878–1937), American baseball player
- Ryan Fuller (born 1990), American baseball coach
- Shorty Fuller (1867–1904), American baseball player, brother of Harry Fuller
- Vern Fuller (born 1944), American baseball player

=== Cricket ===
- Dickie Fuller (1913–1987), Jamaican cricketer
- Donald Fuller (1869–1936), New Zealand cricketer
- Eddie Fuller (1931–2008), South African cricketer
- Edwin Fuller (1850–1917), New Zealand cricketer
- Graham Fuller (born 1931), South African cricketer

=== Football (gridiron) ===
- Aaron Fuller (American football) (born 1997), American football player
- Andre Fuller (born 2002), American football player
- Devin Fuller (born 1994), American football player
- Jeff Fuller (safety) (born 1962), American football player
- Jordan Fuller (born 1998), American football player
- Steve Fuller (American football) (born 1957), American football quarterback

=== Football (soccer) ===
- Barry Fuller (born 1984), English footballer
- Keysher Fuller (born 1994), Costa Rican footballer
- Ricardo Fuller (born 1979), Jamaican footballer
- Sarah Fuller (athlete) (born 1999), American soccer goalkeeper

=== Other ===
- Aaron Fuller (basketball) (born 1989), American basketball player
- Abigail Fuller (born 1959/1960), American Thoroughbred horse jockey
- Danny Fuller (surfer) (born 1982), American surfer, photographer, artist and model
- Debbie Fuller (born 1966), Canadian diver
- Freddy Stephen Fuller, Canadian boxer
- Jeff Fuller (racing driver) (born 1957), American racing driver
- Nikki Fuller (born 1968), American bodybuilder and actress
- Peter D. Fuller (1923–2012), American Thoroughbred owner and businessman, father of Abigail Fuller
- Rick Fuller (born 1967), American wrestler
- Wendy Fuller (born 1965), Canadian diver

== Writing ==
- Alexandra Fuller (born 1969), British writer
- Bryan Fuller (born 1969), American screenwriter
- Charles Fuller (1939–2022), American playwright
- Errol Fuller (born 1947), English author of several books on extinction
- Graham E. Fuller (1936–2026), American political analyst and author
- Henry B. Fuller (1857–1929), writer
- J. Fuller, publisher in 18th century England
- Jean Overton Fuller (1915–2009), British biographer
- John Fuller (poet) (born 1937), English poet
- John G. Fuller (1913–1990), American author
- Margaret Fuller (1810–1850), American journalist and women's rights activist
- Peter Fuller (1948–1990), British art critic and writer
- Roy Fuller (1912–1991), English poet, father of poet John Fuller
- Uriah Fuller, pen name used by American mathematician Martin Gardner

== Other ==
- Aaron Fuller (disambiguation), multiple people
- David Fuller (born 1954), British murderer and necrophile
- Doris Fuller (died 1962), American bridge player
- Edward Fuller (disambiguation), multiple people
- Elizabeth Fuller (school founder) (1644–1709), British benefactress
- Ida Fuller (1854–1930), American co-founder of Sigma Kappa sorority
- Ida May Fuller (1874–1975), centenarian and first American recipient of social security
- Kyle Fuller (disambiguation), multiple people
- Loie Fuller (1862–1928), American modern dance pioneer
- Maud A. B. Fuller (1868–1972), American educator and missionary
- Maxwell Fuller (1945–2013), Australian chess player
- Michael Fuller (born 1959), British chief constable
- Millard Fuller (1935–2009), American humanitarian
- Minnie Rutherford Fuller (1868–1946), American farmer, broker, temperance leader, suffragist
- Robert Fuller (disambiguation), multiple people
- Sarah E. Fuller (1838–1913), national president, Woman's Relief Corps
- Steve Fuller (sociologist) (born 1959), American philosopher
- Victoria Fuller (model) (born 1970), American model
- William Fuller (disambiguation), multiple people

== See also ==
- Chris Fuller, fictional character in the American fantasy sitcom Out of This World
- Fuller (disambiguation)
- Fullmer
- Fullerton (disambiguation)
