= Fuller =

Fuller or Fuller's may refer to:

== People ==
- Fuller (surname)
- A fuller, a worker who cleanses wool through the process of fulling
- Fuller (artist), a British artist known for making map art and intricate drawings

== Places ==
- Fuller, Kansas, an unincorporated community in Crawford County, United States
- Fuller, Michigan, a former community in Michigan
- Fuller, Pennsylvania, an unincorporated community, United States
- Fuller Lake, a body of water in Pennsylvania, United States

== Companies ==
- Fuller's Brewery in London, England, United Kingdom
- Fuller Brush Company
- Fuller's Coffee Shop, a coffee shop in Oregon, United States
- H.B. Fuller, an adhesives manufacturing company in St. Paul, Minnesota
- Fuller Manufacturing, a transmission manufacturing company acquired by the Eaton Corporation in 1958
- Fuller Theological Seminary, in Pasadena, California, United States

== Other uses ==
- Fuller calculator, an advanced cylindrical slide rule with a helical scale
- Fuller's earth, clay used for filtering and purifying
- Fuller (metalworking), a tool used to form metal when hot
- Fuller (weapon), a groove in a knife or sword blade to lighten and stiffen the blade
- USS Fuller, the name of two ships of the U.S. Navy
