= Senator Fuller =

Senator Fuller may refer to:

- Allen C. Fuller (1822–1901), Illinois State Senate
- Benoni S. Fuller (1825–1903), Indiana State Senate
- Charles Eugene Fuller (1849–1926), Illinois State Senate
- Charles H. Fuller (1859–1938), New York State Senate
- David Fuller (politician) (1941–2022), Montana State Senate
- DuFay A. Fuller (1852–1924), Illinois State Senate
- Jean Fuller (born 1950), California State Senate
- Jerome Fuller (1808–1880), New York State Senate
- John Fuller (Montana politician) (fl. 2010s–2020s), Montana State Senate
- Ken Fuller (born 1943), Georgia State Senate
- Levi K. Fuller (1841–1896), Vermont State Senate
- Oramel B. Fuller (1858–1935), Michigan State Senate
- Philo C. Fuller (1787–1855), New York State Senate
- Scott Fuller (fl. 2020s), West Virginia State Senate
- Timothy Fuller (1778–1835), Massachusetts State Senate
