= Fullers =

Fullers may refer to:

- Fuller's Brewery, a British regional brewing company
- Fuller, Smith & Turner, a British pub chain and former brewer
- Fullers Bridge, a bridge in Sydney
- Fullers360, a ferry company in New Zealand

== See also ==
- Fuller (disambiguation)
