= William Fuller =

William Fuller may refer to:

== Politics ==
- William K. Fuller (1792–1883), U.S. Representative from New York
- William E. Fuller (1846–1918), U.S. Representative from Iowa
- William H. Fuller (1876–1943), state legislator in Pennsylvania

== Sports ==
- William Fuller (athlete) (1904–?), Canadian Olympic sprinter
- Bill Fuller (footballer) (born 1944), defender for Crystal Palace F.C.
- William Fuller (American football) (born 1962), American football defensive end
- William Fuller (baseball) (1889–?), American baseball player
- William Fuller (rugby union) (1883–1957), New Zealand rugby union player
- Will Fuller (born 1994), American football wide receiver
- William "Homer" Fuller (1920–2007), American professional basketball player

== Other ==
- Willie H. Fuller (1919–1995), Tuskegee Airman
- William Fuller (priest) (c. 1580–1659), dean of Ely
- William Fuller (bishop) (1608–1675), bishop of Lincoln
- Captain William Fuller (16??–1695), English-born leader of the Puritan forces in the Battle of the Severn and Puritan governor of Maryland
- William Fuller (imposter) (1670–1733), English impostor
- William Fuller (banker) (1705–1800), English benefactor of nonconformist causes
- William Allen Fuller (1836–1905), conductor on the Western & Atlantic Railroad during the American Civil War era
- Chief William Fuller (1873–1958), Miwok Indian Chief, see Tuolumne County, California
- William Charles Fuller (1884–1974), VC recipient
- William Fuller (poet) (born 1953), U.S. poet

== See also ==
- Will Furrer (born 1968), American football quarterback
