= Margaret Fuller (disambiguation) =

Margaret Fuller (1810–1850) was an American journalist, critic, and women's rights advocate.

Margaret Fuller may also refer to:

- Margaret T. Fuller, American developmental biologist
- Margaret Fuller (curler), curler in the British Columbia Scotties Tournament of Hearts

== See also ==
- Fuller (surname)
- Margaret Fuller House, birthplace and childhood home of the women's rights advocate
