= Edward Fuller =

Edward Fuller may refer to:

- Edward Fuller (U.S. Marine Corps officer) (1893–1918)
- Edward Fuller (Mayflower passenger) (1575–1621), passenger on the 1620 voyage of the ship Mayflower
- Edward Newman Fuller (1888–1969), English rugby union player
- Eddie Fuller (1931–2008), South African cricketer
- Edward Laton Fuller, 1800s crime syndicate boss
- Eddie Fuller (English footballer) (1900–?)
- Ed Fuller (1868–1935), baseball player
- Edward M. Fuller & Company, bankrupt New York stock brokerage
