= Robert Fuller =

Robert, Bobby, Robbie, Rob or Bob Fuller may refer to:

== Academics ==
- Robert W. Fuller (1936–2025), American president of Oberlin College
- Robert C. Fuller (born 1952), American professor of religious studies

== Performers ==
- Robert Fuller (actor) (born 1933), American TV Western star
- Bob Fuller (1898–after 1935), American blues and jazz saxophonist and clarinetist
- Bobby Fuller (1942–1966), American rock and roll singer and guitarist

== Sportsmen ==
- Robert Fuller (footballer) (born 1964), Australian rules footballer
- Robbie Fuller, British speedway racer in 1984 through 1988 British League season
- Rob Fuller (racing driver) (born 1973), American stock car racing driver

== Wrestlers ==
- Robert Fuller (wrestler) (born 1949), American wrestler and manager, birth name Robert Welch
- Robert Fuller Jr. (born 1958), American wrestler, birth name Robert Gibson

== Others ==
- Robert Oliver Fuller (1829–1903), American politician
- Robert Fuller (FBI agent), American counter-terrorism agent since 1990s
- Robert E. Fuller (born 1972), English wildlife artist
- Robert L. Fuller (1996–2020), African American found hanged in California

== See also ==
- Robert Fuller House, American historic house in Massachusetts
