= USS Fuller (DD-297) =

Clemson-class destroyer

Coordinates: 34°36′11″N 120°38′43″W

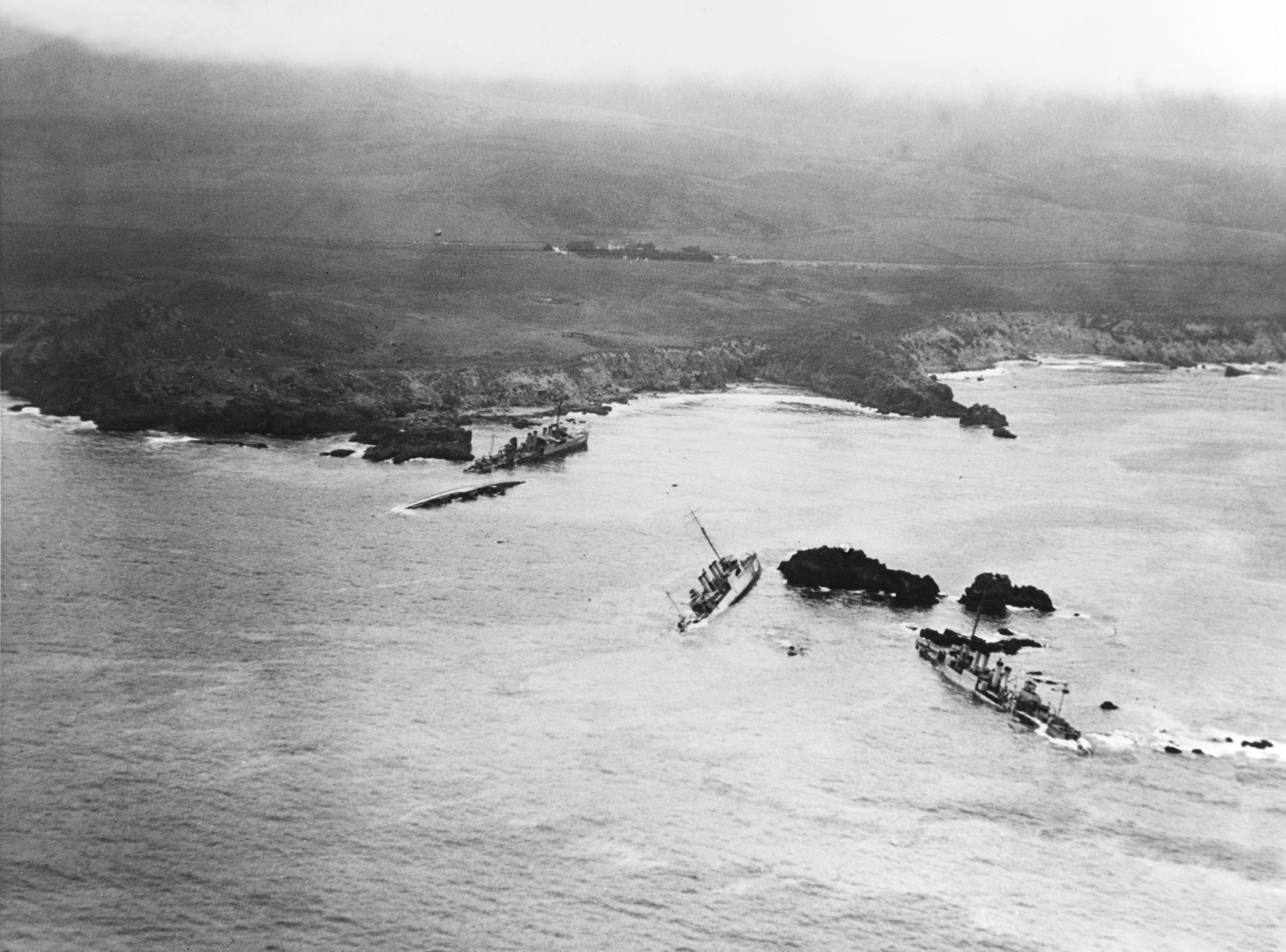
- Five destroyers on the rocks at Honda Point, 1923. Fuller (right) on the rocks at Honda Point in September 1923. The photo also shows the wrecks of Woodbury (right center), Delphy (capsized in the small cove at left), Young (capsized in left center), and Chauncey (upright ahead of Young).

History

United States
- Namesake: Edward Fuller
- Builder: Bethlehem Shipbuilding Corporation, Union Iron Works, San Francisco
- Laid down: 4 July 1918
- Launched: 5 December 1918
- Commissioned: 28 February 1920
- Decommissioned: 26 October 1923
- Fate: Wrecked in the Honda Point Disaster, 8 September 1923

General characteristics
- Class & type: Clemson-class destroyer
- Displacement: 1,290 long tons (1,311 t) (standard); 1,389 long tons (1,411 t) (deep load)
- Length: 314 ft 4 in (95.8 m)
- Beam: 30 ft 11 in (9.42 m)
- Draught: 10 ft 3 in (3.1 m)
- Installed power: 27,000 shp (20,000 kW); 4 water-tube boilers
- Propulsion: 2 shafts, 2 steam turbines
- Speed: 35 knots (65 km/h; 40 mph) (design)
- Range: 2,500 nautical miles (4,600 km; 2,900 mi) at 20 knots (37 km/h; 23 mph) (design)
- Complement: 6 officers, 108 enlisted men
- Armament: 4 × single 4-inch (102 mm) guns; 2 × single 1-pounder AA guns or; 2 × single 3-inch (76 mm) guns; 4 × triple 21 inch (533 mm) torpedo tubes; 2 × depth charge rails

USS Fuller (DD-297) was a Clemson-class destroyer built for the United States Navy during World War I.

== Description ==
The Clemson class was a repeat of the preceding Wickes class although more fuel capacity was added. The ships displaced 1,290 long tons (1,311 t) at standard load and 1,389 long tons (1,411 t) at deep load. They had an overall length of 314 feet 4 inches (95.8 m), a beam of 30 feet 11 inches (9.4 m) and a draught of 10 feet 3 inches (3.1 m). They had a crew of 6 officers and 108 enlisted men.

Performance differed radically between the ships of the class, often due to poor workmanship. The Clemson class was powered by two steam turbines, each driving one propeller shaft, using steam provided by four water-tube boilers. The turbines were designed to produce a total of 27,000 shaft horsepower (20,000 kW) intended to reach a speed of 35 knots (65 km/h; 40 mph). The ships carried a maximum of 371 long tons (377 t) of fuel oil which was intended gave them a range of 2,500 nautical miles (4,600 km; 2,900 mi) at 20 knots (37 km/h; 23 mph).

The ships were armed with four 4-inch (102 mm) guns in single mounts and were fitted with two 1-pounder guns for anti-aircraft defense. In many ships a shortage of 1-pounders caused them to be replaced by 3-inch (76 mm) guns. Their primary weapon, though, was their torpedo battery of a dozen 21 inch (533 mm) torpedo tubes in four triple mounts. They also carried a pair of depth charge rails. A "Y-gun" depth charge thrower was added to many ships.

== Construction and career ==
Fuller, the first Navy ship named for Marine Captain Edward Fuller, who was killed in the Battle of Belleau Wood, was launched 5 December 1918 by Bethlehem Shipbuilding Corporation, San Francisco, California; sponsored by Miss Gladys Sullivan; and commissioned on 28 February 1920. After a brief cruise to the Hawaiian Islands, Fuller arrived at her home port, San Diego, California, on 28 April 1920, and at once took up the schedule of training which took the Pacific destroyers along the west coast from California to Oregon. In February and March 1923, she joined in Battle Fleet maneuvers in the Panama Canal Zone, and returned to experimental torpedo firing and antiaircraft firing practice off San Diego.

In July 1923, with her division, she sailed north for maneuvers and repairs at Navy Yard Puget Sound. While making their homeward-bound passage from San Francisco, California to San Diego on the night of 8 September, the division went on the rocks at Point Honda when mistakes were made in positional calculations, causing the Honda Point Disaster in the foggy darkness. Fuller was abandoned, with all of her crew reaching safety. The ship later broke in two and sank. She was decommissioned 26 October 1923.
