= Fullmer =

Fullmer is a surname. Notable people with the surname include:

- Baldwin W. Fullmer (1834–1910), American farmer, politician, newspaper editor and Methodist minister
- Brad Fullmer (born 1975), American baseball player
- David Fullmer (1803–1879), American politician, church leader and farmer
- Don Fullmer (1939–2012), American boxer
- Gene Fullmer (1931–2015), American boxer
- John S. Fullmer (1807–1883), American politician and farmer
- June Zimmerman Fullmer (1920–2000), American historian
- Randy Fullmer (1950–2023), American businessman
- Steve Fullmer (born 1946), American-born New Zealand potter

== See also ==
- Meanings of minor planet names: 20001–21000#373
