= William H. Hinebaugh =

American politician (1867–1943)

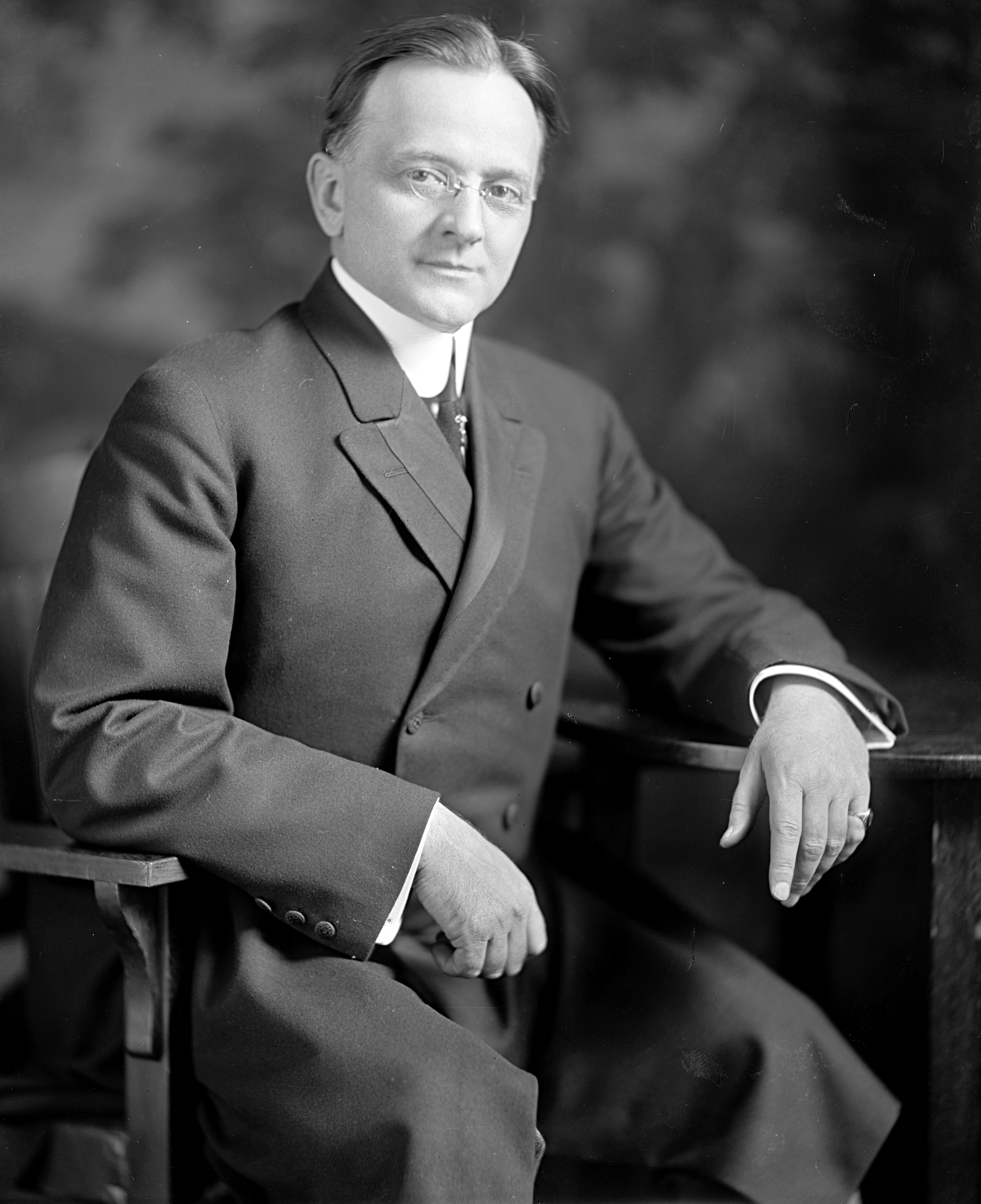
- Hinebaugh, 1905–1943

Member of the U.S. House of Representatives from Illinois's 12th district
- In office March 4, 1913 – March 3, 1915
- Preceded by: Charles E. Fuller
- Succeeded by: Charles E. Fuller

Personal details
- Born: December 16, 1867 Marshall, Michigan
- Died: September 22, 1943 (aged 75) Albion, Michigan
- Party: Progressive

William Henry Hinebaugh (December 16, 1867 – September 22, 1943) was a U.S. Representative from Illinois.

Born near Marshall, Michigan, Hinebaugh attended the common schools, Litchfield High School, the Michigan State Normal School (now Eastern Michigan University at Ypsilanti, Michigan, and the University of Michigan at Ann Arbor. He moved to Illinois and settled in Ottawa in 1891. He studied law. He was admitted to the bar in 1893 and commenced practice in Ottawa. He was appointed assistant prosecuting attorney of LaSalle County, Illinois in December 1900. He served as judge of the La Salle County Court 1902-1912. He served as president of the State Association of County Judges of Illinois 1908-1910.

Hinebaugh was elected and reelected chairman of the Republican county central committee, but resigned in July 1912 to join the Progressive Party.

Hinebaugh was elected as a Progressive to the Sixty-third Congress (March 4, 1913 – March 3, 1915). He was an unsuccessful candidate for re-election in 1914 to the Sixty-fourth Congress. He resumed the practice of law in Ottawa, Illinois. He served as assistant attorney general of Illinois 1916-1922. He served as president and general counsel of the Central Life Insurance Co., of Illinois, and resided in Chicago. He moved to Albion, Michigan, in 1933 and continued the practice of law until his death there September 22, 1943. He was interred in Mount Hope Cemetery, Litchfield, Michigan.

U.S. House of Representatives
| Preceded by Charles E. Fuller | Member of the U.S. House of Representatives from Illinois's 12th congressional district March 4, 1913 - March 3, 1915 | Succeeded by Charles E. Fuller |
