= A. W. F. Fuller =

British anthropologist and ethnographic collector

Alfred Fuller examining his collection.

Alfred Walter Francis Fuller FRAI (29 March 1882 – 13 December 1961) was a British anthropologist and ethnographic collector, best known for his collection of over 6,800 items from the Pacific that is now held in the Field Museum in Chicago.

== Early life ==
Fuller was born in 1882 in Sussex to Rev. Alfred Fuller. He was educated at Dulwich College.

== Career ==
Fuller qualified as a solicitor but on the outbreak of World War I he joined the Oxfordshire and Buckinghamshire Light Infantry and rose to the rank of captain while serving on the Salonika front. He saw action in Bulgaria, but by 1918 had retired on a disability pension due to ill-health.

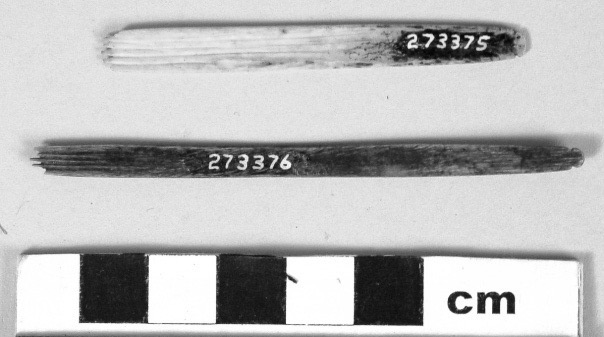
Iuhi tattooing needles from Easter Island, donated to the Field Museum by Fuller.

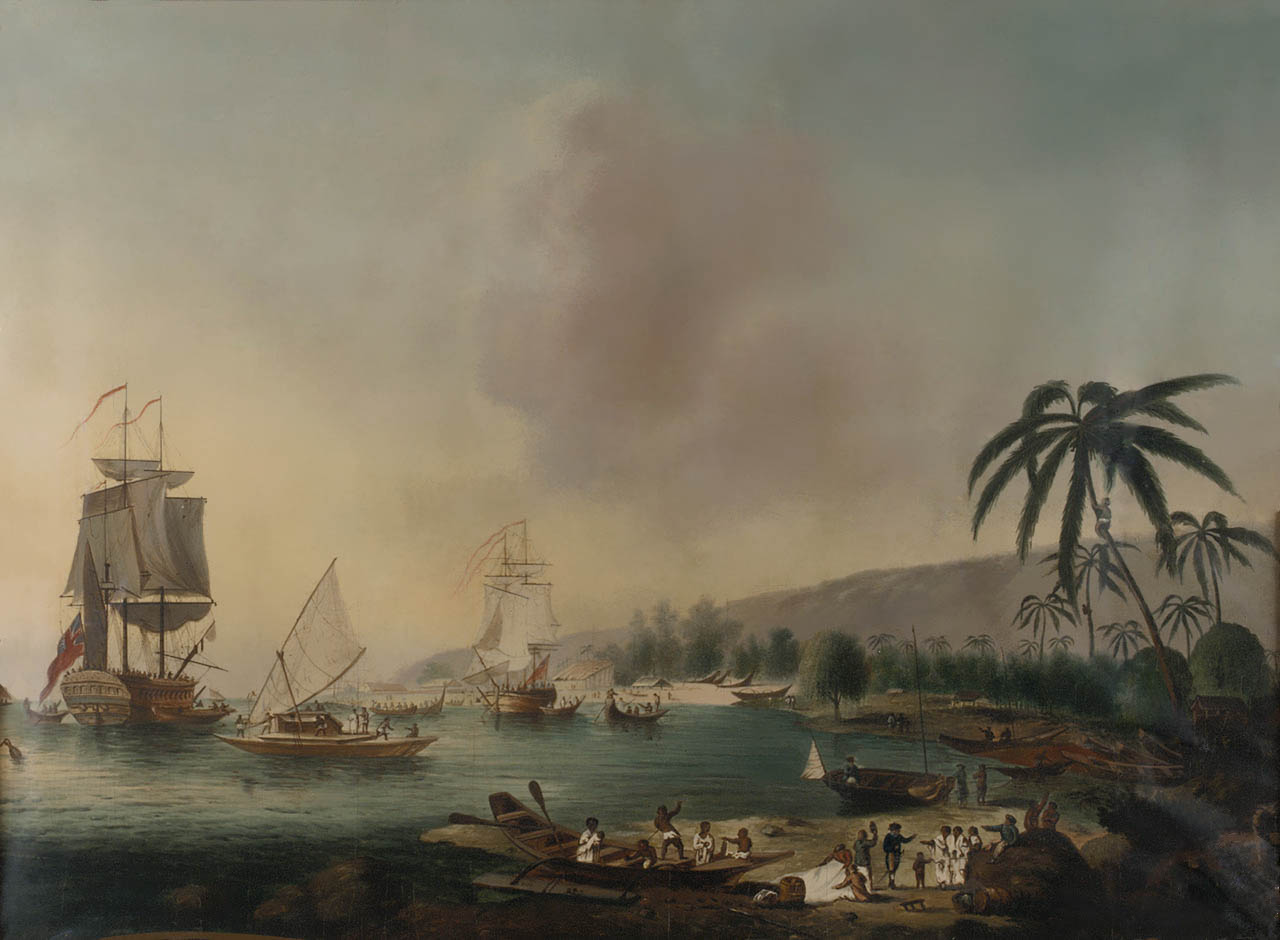
HMS Resolution and Discovery in Tahiti, John Cleveley the Younger, c.1770-90. Oil on canvas, National Maritime Museum, Greenwich. Donated by Fuller.

== Collecting ==
Always a keen anthropologist, Fuller began collecting on a large scale after the war, principally at auctions and from closing local museums. He married Estelle Cleverly in 1924 and with her continued to develop the collection and to build up a library of more than 20,000 volumes. He volunteered at the British Museum for a time and was a Fellow of the Royal Anthropological Institute. He refused throughout his life to deal in objects, and the only sale he made was in 1958, shortly before his death, when he sold more than 6,800 items from the Pacific to the Field Museum in Chicago for £40,000 (the equivalent of £814,500 as of 2025). After his death in 1961 the rest of his collection was dispersed by his wife: the library was eventually purchased by the Bishop Museum in Hawaii.

=== A. W. F. Fuller Collection at the Field Museum ===
Throughout his life, Fuller acquired an extensive collection of Polynesian artifacts. Along with about 6,885 artifacts were purchased by the Field Museum from the Fullers. Additionally, about 300 more items would be donated to the museum by Fuller's wife at a later time. This collection was formed over 62 years of Fullers lifetime when he was constantly purchasing and trading items in Britain. His collection was created during an era when Great Britain and Polynesia had a relationship that allowed the import of many Polynesian artifacts. Although Fuller never visited Polynesia, he acquired his items through purchase and gifts. For instance, sale in private homes, sale of museum inventories, auctions, and the shops of dealers are all places where he was able to purchase Polynesian objects. Sometimes he would trade an item that did not fit into his collection as well as the object that he was trading for. Additionally, events such as the missionary movements of London missionary and Melanesian missionary societies brought in many artifacts from the Polynesian world. Other items were acquired from the private collections of other military officials. He could also find amazing items in antique shops and he would be very excited if he found something that was worth a lot, but he paid a little for it because the shop owner did not understand the value of the object. From the adventures of missionaries and the army, various objects were brought back to Britain. The items he acquired included numerous variations of the same object that exemplified technological advancement. He compared and studied each object and he wanted as complete of a picture of the item as possible. Fuller was dedicated to collecting these items, but he never visited Polynesia. He was what one would call an armchair anthropologist because he never actually visited the sites, but acquired items that were so useful to the knowledge of Polynesian culture. In his older years he announced that he was looking for a museum or similar institution to house the collection. He was put into contact with the Field Museum officials through a friend, and in the 1950s he sold the collection. He was initially against selling the items, but eventually agreed upon a price, 40,000 pounds (today that would be about 834,600 pounds), that he felt would do well for his daughter after he died. In addition to acquisition of the collection the museum agreed to not split up the collection. Fuller wanted scientists to have as complete of a picture as possible for study and the acquisition of knowledge of old Polynesian societies. When the negotiations of price were being made, Fuller talked with Roland W. Force, a museum representative, and told the stories of how he acquired each item, the date, and any story that went along with the item. He also told what he could on its origins and how it was acquired. The archived recordings of their conversations are available through the museum.

== See also ==
- Object history of the Iuhi
