= Ben Hebard Fuller =

United States Marine Corps general

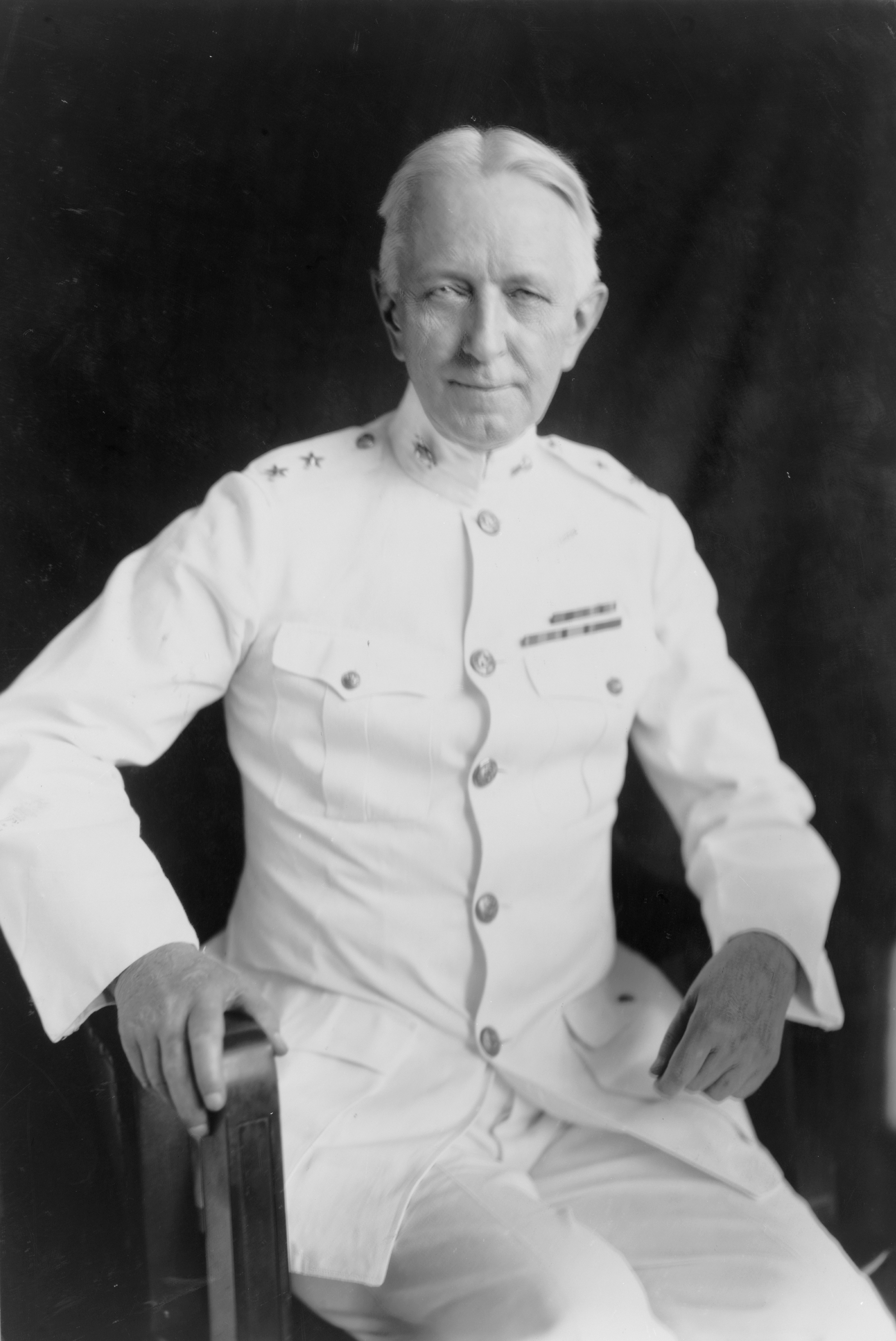
- 15th Commandant of the Marine Corps (1930–1934)
- Born: February 27, 1870; Big Rapids, Michigan, U.S.
- Died: June 8, 1937 (aged 67) Washington, D.C., U.S.
- Buried: Naval Academy Cemetery
- Allegiance: United States of America
- Branch: Navy; Marine Corps
- Service years: 1889–1891 (Navy); 1891–1934 (Marines)
- Rank: Major General
- Commands: Commandant of the Marine Corps
- Conflicts: Philippine–American War; Boxer Rebellion: Battle of Tientsin; Banana Wars: Occupation of the Dominican Republic; Occupation of Haiti

Ben Hebard Fuller (February 27, 1870 – June 8, 1937) was a major general in the United States Marine Corps and served as the 15th Commandant of the Marine Corps between 1930 and 1934.

== Biography ==
Born in Big Rapids, Michigan, Fuller was a member of the United States Naval Academy class of 1889. After serving two years of service as a naval cadet, a requirement at the time before commissioning, he was appointed a second lieutenant in the Marine Corps on July 1, 1891. He, with six other members of his class, attended the first course for new Marine officers at the School of Application, which was the prototype for today's Basic School.

On 26 October 1892, he married Katherine Heaton Offley. Together, they had two children.

Captain Fuller participated in the Second Battle of Noveleta, Philippine Islands on October 8, 1899, and was commended for gallant, meritorious, and courageous conduct in the Battle of Tientsin, China on July 13, 1900.

From 1904 to 1906, he served at the Naval Station, Honolulu, Territory of Hawaii. In June and July 1908, he was on detached duty with an expeditionary force organized for service in Panama, and from August of that year until January 1910, commanded a Marine Battalion at Camp Elliott, Panama Canal Zone. From March to June 1911, he commanded the 3rd Regiment of Marines at Camp Meyer, Guantanamo Bay, Cuba.

From 1911 to 1915, he commanded various posts and stations in the United States, and during this period also, he completed the Field Officers’ Course at the Army Service Schools, Fort Leavenworth, Kansas, and the course at the Army War College, Washington, D.C. Following a tour of duty as Fleet Marine Officer of the U.S. Atlantic Fleet, from January 1915 to June 1916, LtCol Fuller was assigned to the Naval War College, Newport, Rhode Island, where he successfully completed the course.

In August 1918, he was assigned to command the 2nd Brigade of Marines in the Dominican Republic, remaining there until October 1920. He also served on the Staff of the Military Governor of Santo Domingo as Secretary of State, Interior, Police, War and Navy, from December 1919, until his detachment departed from Santo Domingo.

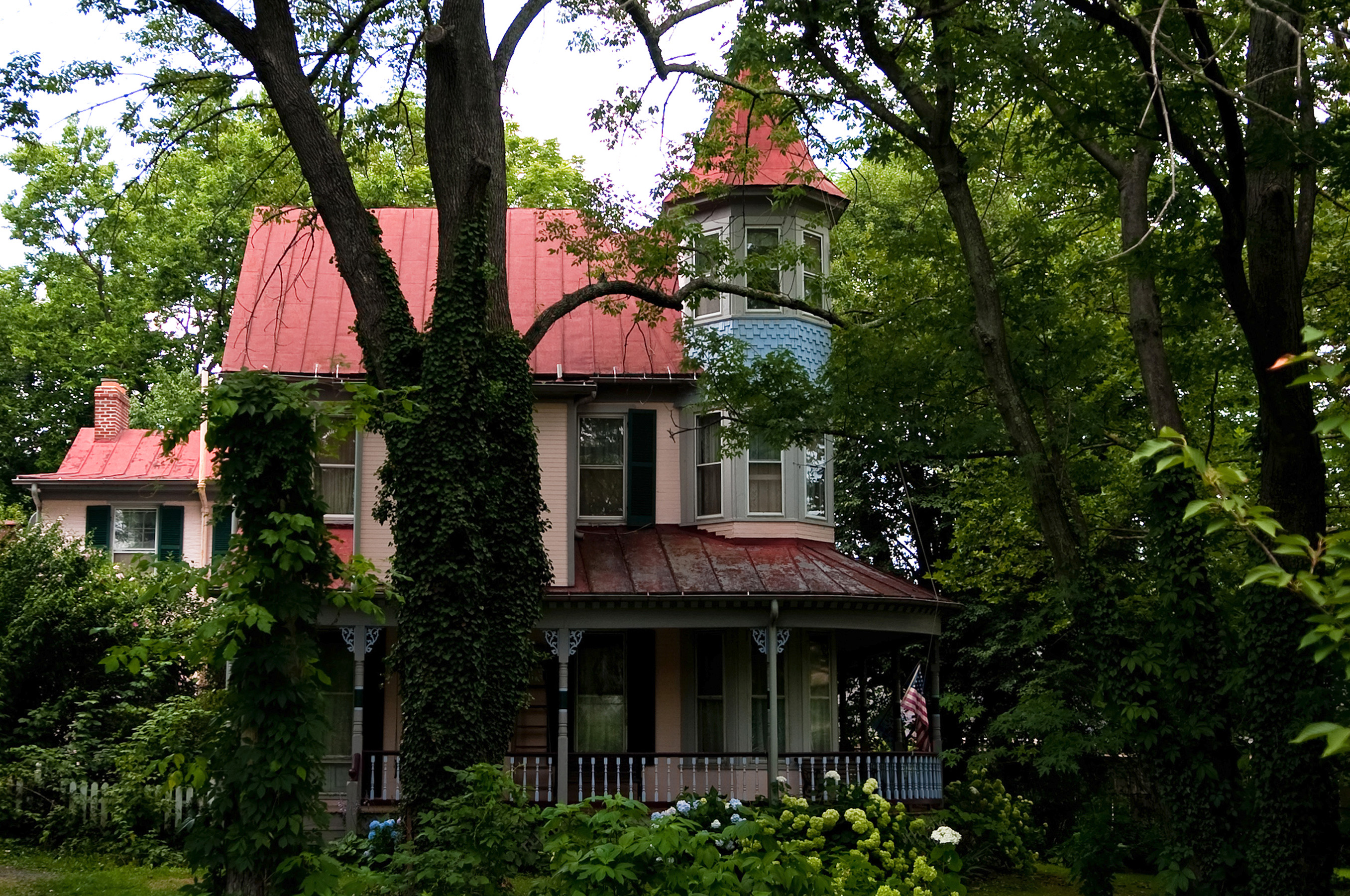
Intermittent home of Maj. Gen. Ben H. Fuller, in Hamilton, Virginia, 46 miles west of Washington, D.C.

From November 1920 to July 1922, he served on the staff of the Naval War College, Newport, and from July 1922 to January 1923, commanded the Marine Corps Schools, Quantico, Virginia. In January 1924, he assumed command of the 1st Brigade of Marines in the Republic of Haiti, with headquarters at Port-au-Prince, and served in this capacity until December 8, 1925.

Following his return to the United States from Haiti, Brigadier General Fuller was assigned to Headquarters Marine Corps as President of the Marine Examining and Retiring Board, serving in that capacity until July 1928, when he was appointed Assistant to the Commandant of the Marine Corps. In September 1928 he was designated as the first Officer in Charge, United States Marine Corps Reserve, when a separate reserve section was created to administer that organization in the Office of the Commandant. During November and December of that year he was on the Reserve Board that was formed to set policy. Fuller was the head of the Reserve until May 1929.

Following the death of the Commandant, Major General Wendell C. Neville on July 9, 1930, Brigadier General Fuller was promoted to major general and appointed Commandant of the Marine Corps. He served in that capacity until March 1, 1934, when he was retired from active service, having attained the statutory retirement age of sixty-four years.

Major General Fuller's tenure was a period of general retrenchment and withdrawal of Marines from foreign countries. Beginning in 1933, these Marines composed the newly designated Fleet Marine Force, the principal operating force of the Marine Corps.

Major General Fuller died on June 8, 1937, aged 67, at the U.S. Naval Hospital, Washington, D.C., and was buried on June 11, 1937, in the U.S. Naval Academy Cemetery at Annapolis, Maryland, beside the grave of his son, Captain Edward C. Fuller of the 6th Marine Regiment, who was killed in action in the Battle of Belleau Wood during World War I.

=== Promotion history ===
- Second Lieutenant, July 1, 1891
- First Lieutenant, March 16, 1893
- Captain, March 3, 1899
- Major, December 27, 1903
- Lieutenant colonel, February 3, 1911
- Colonel, August 29, 1916
- Brigadier General (temporary), July 1, 1918
- Brigadier General, February 8, 1924
- Major General August 7, 1930
- Commandant of the Marine Corps, August 7, 1930

=== Medals and decoration ===
Fuller held the following medals and decorations:

China Relief Expedition Medal		Marine Corps Expeditionary Medal w/ 2 stars
Spanish Campaign Medal	Philippine Campaign Medal	Second Nicaraguan Campaign Medal
World War I Victory Medal	Medal of Military Merit of Santo Domingo	Presidential Medal of Merit of Nicaragua

== Namesake ==
The United States Navy transport ship USS Fuller was named in his honor.

The road running from the main gate of Marine Corps Base Quantico to the town of Quantico, Virginia is named Fuller Road.

An enlisted housing facility at the Naval Support Activity Annapolis is named Fuller Hall.

== See also ==
Military offices
Preceded by Maj. Gen. Wendell Cushing Neville	Commandant of the United States Marine Corps; 1930–1935	Succeeded by Maj. Gen. John H. Russell Jr.
Preceded by Position established	Officer in Charge of the United States Marine Corps Reserve; 1928–1929	Succeeded by Col. Julius S. Turrill
Preceded by Brig. Gen. Dion Williams	Assistant to the Commandant of the Marine Corps; 1928–1930	Succeeded by Brig. Gen. John Twiggs Myers
