= William Fuller (imposter) =

William Fuller, English impostor, was born at Milton in Kent. His paternity is doubtful, but he was related to the family of Herbert.

After 1688, Fuller served Mary of Modena, Queen consort of James II of England, and the Jacobites while seeking at the same time to gain favor with William III of England. After associating with Titus Oates, being imprisoned for debt and pretending to reveal Jacobite plots, the House of Commons in 1692 declared he was an imposter, cheat and false accuser.

Having stood in the pillory, he was again imprisoned until 1695, when he was released; at this time he took the opportunity to revive the old and familiar story that Mary of Modena was not the mother of James Francis Edward Stuart, Prince of Wales. In 1701, he published his autobiographical Life of William Fuller and some Original Letters of the late King James. Unable to prove the assertions made in his writings he was put in the pillory, whipped and fined. He was still in Newgate Prison in 1730, when he wrote to William Wake, archbishop of Canterbury, disavowing (not for the first time) his earlier inventions. He was almost certainly the William Fuller, prisoner, whose burial is recorded in the register of Christ Church Newgate on 24 March 1733.

Fuller's other writings are Mr. William Fuller's trip to Bridewell, with a full account of his barbarous usage in the pillory; The sincere and hearty confession of Mr. William Fuller (1704); and An humble appeal to the impartial judgment of all parties in Great Britain (1716).
