= June Zimmerman Fullmer =

American historian of chemistry

June Fullmer (née Zimmerman; December 12, 1920 – January 31, 2000) was an American historian of chemistry.

== Biography ==
June Zimmerman was born in Illinois on December 12, 1920. She was educated at the Illinois Institute of Technology, and gained her PhD in physical chemistry in 1948 from Bryn Mawr College. She did postdoctoral work at Oxford University (1949–50) under Sir Cyril Hinshelwood, then became an Assistant Professor of Chemistry at Chatham College in Pittsburgh (1950–53), served as a research associate at Carnegie Institute of Technology (1954–55), and Associate Professor and Head of the Chemistry Department (1955–64) at Newcomb College, the women's college of Tulane University, New Orleans, Louisiana. After a short stint at Ohio Wesleyan University, in 1966, she joined the Department of History at The Ohio State University, where she taught history of science as an associate and then full professor, retiring in 1984. In 1953, she married Paul Fullmer, who died on January 6, 2000, predeceasing her by only several weeks.

Professor Fullmer held grants from the National Science Foundation and fellowships from the American Association of University Women, the American Council of Learned Societies, and the Guggenheim Foundation. She was active in various history of science organizations and became Chairman of the American Chemical Society's Division of History of Chemistry in 1971.

Her publications, ranging from technical articles in chemistry journals, to biography, to essays on science and poetry, were polymathic in scope. Fullmer was the author of Sir Humphry Davy's Published Works, published in 1969-70 by Harvard University Press and Oxford University Press. At the time of her death, which occurred on January 31, 2000, she was completing her multi-volume biography of Sir Humphry Davy, being published by the American Philosophical Society. Page proofs for the first volume, Young Humphry Davy: The Making of an Experimental Chemist, arrived just after she died.
