= Aaron Fuller =

Aaron Fuller may refer to:

- Aaron Fuller (American football) (born 1997), American football player
- Aaron Fuller (basketball) (born 1989), American basketball player
- Aaron Fuller (military) (1738–1816), American military officer
