= Fuller (metalworking) =

Tool

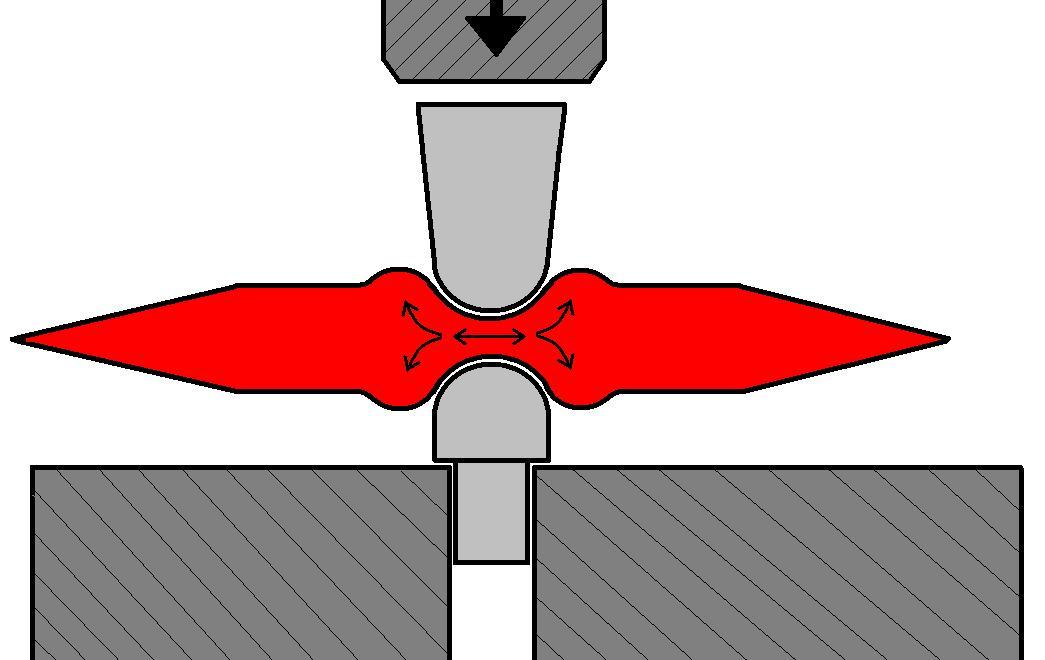
Fullers (light gray) used to displace material (red)

In metalworking, a fuller is a tool used to shape hot metal. The fuller has a rounded nose, which may be either cylindrical or parabolic. It may have a handle (an "upper fuller") or a shank (a "lower fuller"). The shank of the lower fuller allows insertion into the hardy hole of the anvil. Upper fullers come in "straight" or "cross" varieties, depending on the handle's orientation relative to the face.

The fuller is a forging tool used to spread metal. The fuller is placed against the metal stock. Either the fuller (for an upper fuller) or the stock (for a lower fuller) is then struck with a hammer. The fuller's rounded nose spreads the metal more efficiently than the flat face of a hammer. The process leaves ridges in the stock, which can later be flattened with a hammer or other tools. "Fullering," more generally, refers to any forging process that creates a sharp transition in the cross-section of the material. With care, some types of fullering can be achieved using only a hammer and the edge of the anvil (which acts as the fuller).

== See also ==
- Fuller (groove), a groove on a blade, often created by fullering
- Swaging
