= Fuller, Pennsylvania =

Unincorporated community in Pennsylvania, U.S.

Coordinates: 41°05′53″N 78°59′04″W

Fuller is an unincorporated community in Jefferson County, in the U.S. state of Pennsylvania.

== History ==
A post office was established at Fuller in 1875, and remained in operation until 1915. Abel Fuller was the first postmaster.
