= Eddie Fuller (English footballer) =

English footballer

Personal information
- Full name: Edward William Fuller
- Date of birth: 25 June 1900
- Place of birth: Staines, Middlesex, England
- Date of death: 9 June 1966 (aged 65)
- Place of death: Worthing, Sussex, England
- Height: 5 ft 8 in (1.73 m)
- Positions: Wing half; centre forward

Senior career*
Years	Team	Apps	(Gls)
- London Caledonians
1921–1927	Brighton & Hove Albion	72	(20)
1927–1929	Watford	55	(0)
1929–1931	Brighton & Hove Albion	2	(0)
1932–1933	Brighton & Hove Albion	0	(0)
1933–1935	Worthing		
- * Club domestic league appearances and goals

Edward William Fuller (25 June 1900 – 9 June 1966) was a professional footballer who scored 20 goals from 129 appearances in the Football League playing for Brighton & Hove Albion and Watford.

Fuller was born in Staines, Middlesex, the eldest child of dairyman Robert Ernest Fuller and Rose Charlotte Mason. He joined Brighton & Hove Albion in 1921 as a wing half but was converted to play at centre forward, and finished the 1922–23 season as the club's top scorer, with 13 goals. After Tommy Cook's introduction to the first team, Fuller reverted to wing half, and in 1927 he joined Watford on a free transfer. He spent two years at Watford before returning to Brighton where he played mainly for the reserve team. After a year out of the game, he spent another season with Brighton's reserves, then dropped out of the Football League to join Worthing, with whom he won the Sussex County League and Sussex Senior Cup during the next two seasons.

He served with the Royal Air Force toward the end of First World War. He later became a dairyman like his father and lived in Worthing, Sussex, where he died in 1966.
