= Robert E. Fuller =

British wildlife artist (born 1972)

- Born: 1 July 1972 (age 53)
- Known for: Paintings
- Style: Wildlife
- Website: robertefuller.com

Robert E. Fuller (born 1 July 1972) is a British wildlife artist and filmmaker. He travels the world to study birds and animals in their natural habitats. He is known for his renditions of British fauna in oils, acrylic and bronze. He favours a detailed, realistic style and has sold work to the Royal Society for the Prevention of Cruelty to Animals and the National Trust.

== Life and work ==
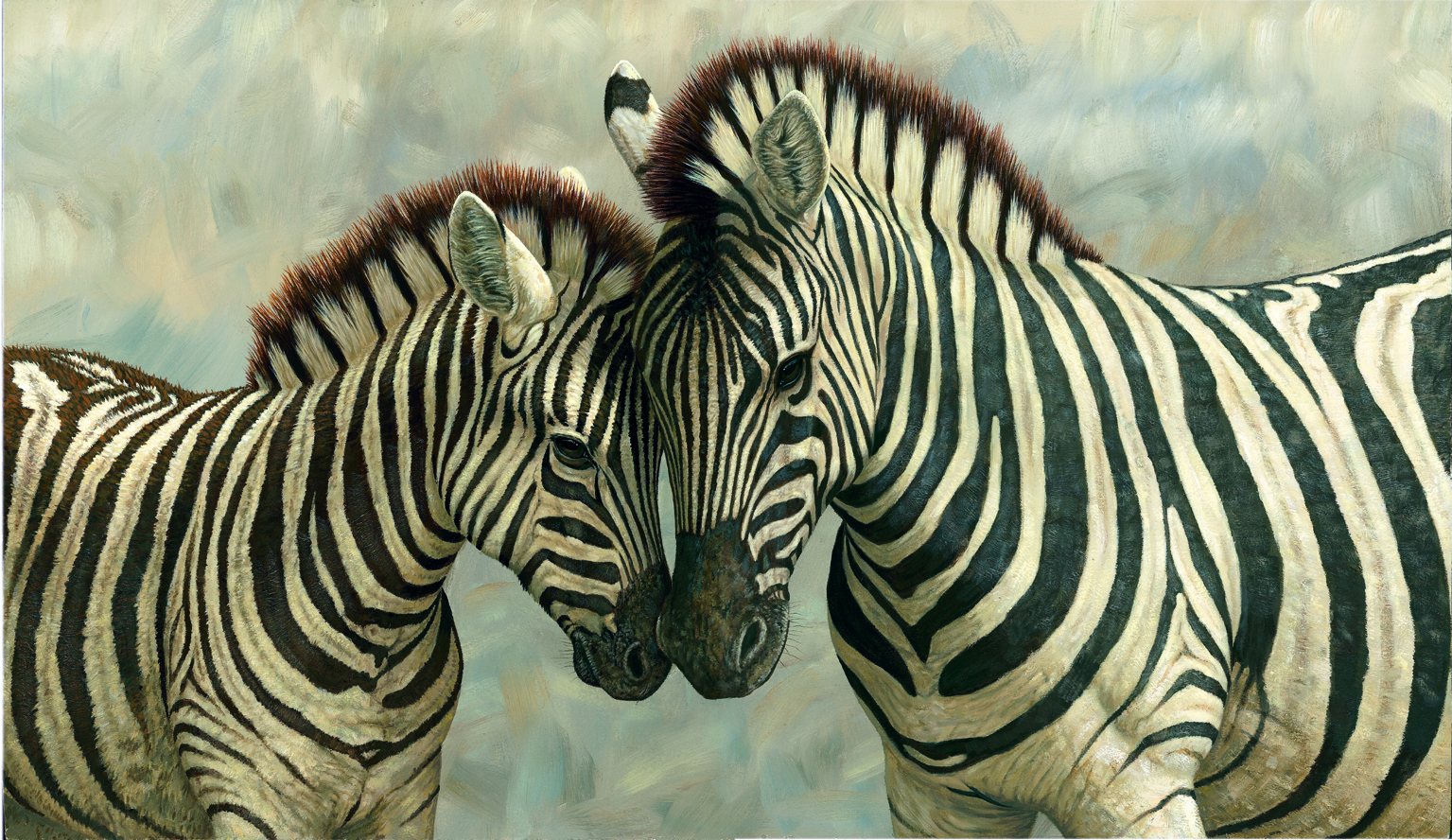
Zebra with young by Robert E. Fuller.

Fuller moved to Great Givendale as a child, where his father, Richard Fuller, an author and wildlife enthusiast, won the Silver Lapwing award for farm conservation.

Fuller writes a blog about his wildlife watching experiences and is a freelance journalist. His articles include a feature on his intensive five-year research project into the secret lives of the stoats living in his garden for BBC Wildlife Magazine published in April 2019 and a piece on stoats & weasels for BBC Countryfile Magazine in May 2018.

A conservationist, Fuller combines his art with work to preserve the animals and birds to which he owes his livelihood. He uses his paintings to raise funds for conservation and works with conservationists to foster owls in the wild. He also helps to rehabilitate stoats and weasels for Mustelid Rescue UK.

His appearances on British television championing wild creatures near his home and gallery on the Yorkshire Wolds have earned him a reputation as an ambassador for the region's wildlife. As such he appeared on ITV's Calendar, Countryfile on 12 April 2011, BBC Look North and BBC The One Show on 16 January 2013.

In 2011 Fuller was given an award for bravery by the RSPCA after his quick action when he stumbled upon an armed gang of badger baiters and helped secure a successful conviction.

In 2014, Fuller visited the Galápagos Islands and subsequently painted a series of Galapagos wildlife pieces. These were the focus of the summer exhibition at his gallery and then went on display at The Deep (aquarium) in Hull. He also did a series of school visits in Yorkshire with staff from the Galapagos Conservation Trust.
