= Kyle Fuller (disambiguation) =

Kyle Fuller is an American football cornerback.

Kyle Fuller may also refer to:

- Kyle Fuller (basketball), a Peruvian-American basketball player
- Kyle Fuller (offensive lineman), an American football offensive lineman
