= Grind =

Cross sectional shape of a blade in a plane normal to its edge

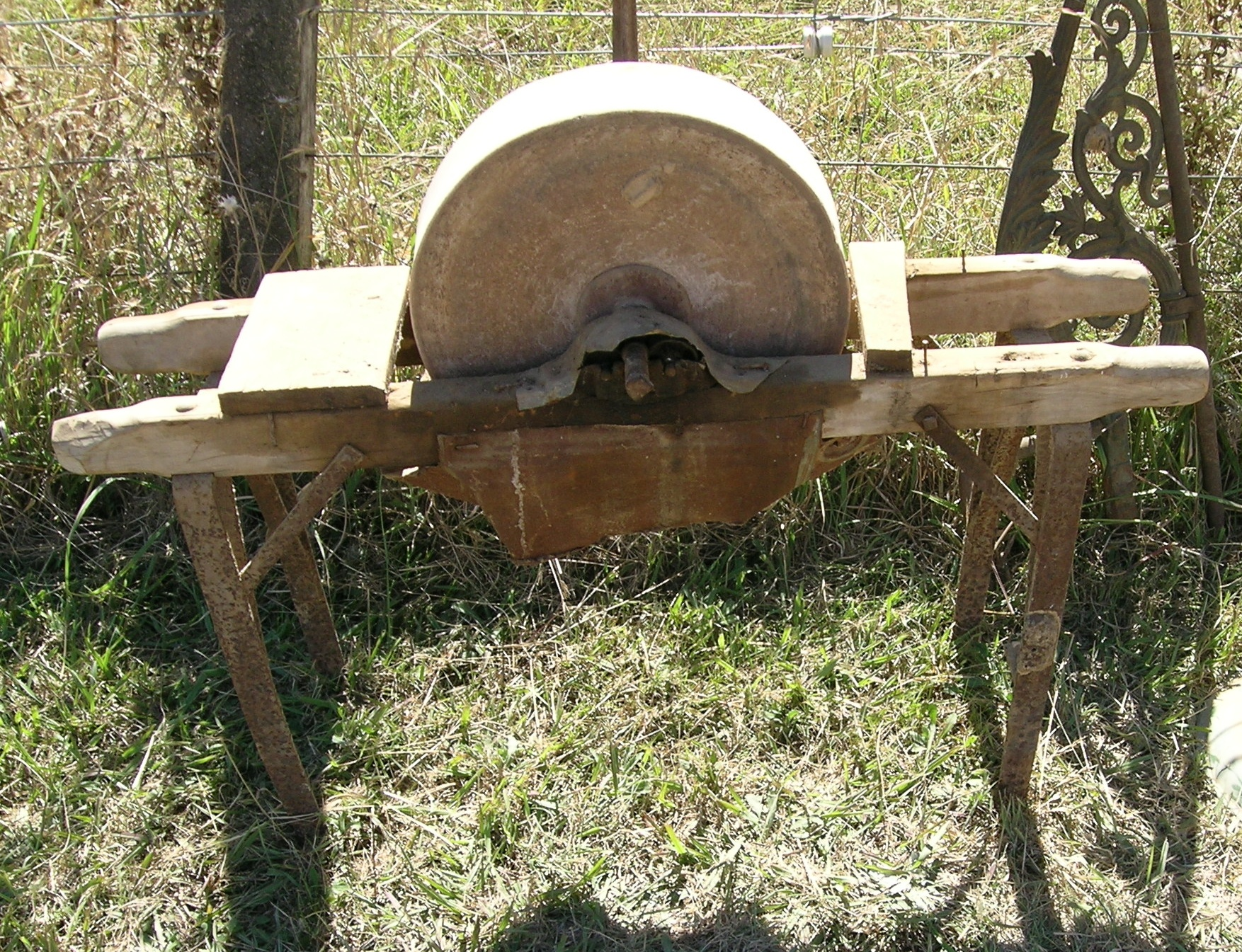
A wetgrinder is a hand-operated grinding stone where the swarf is gathered below the stone in water

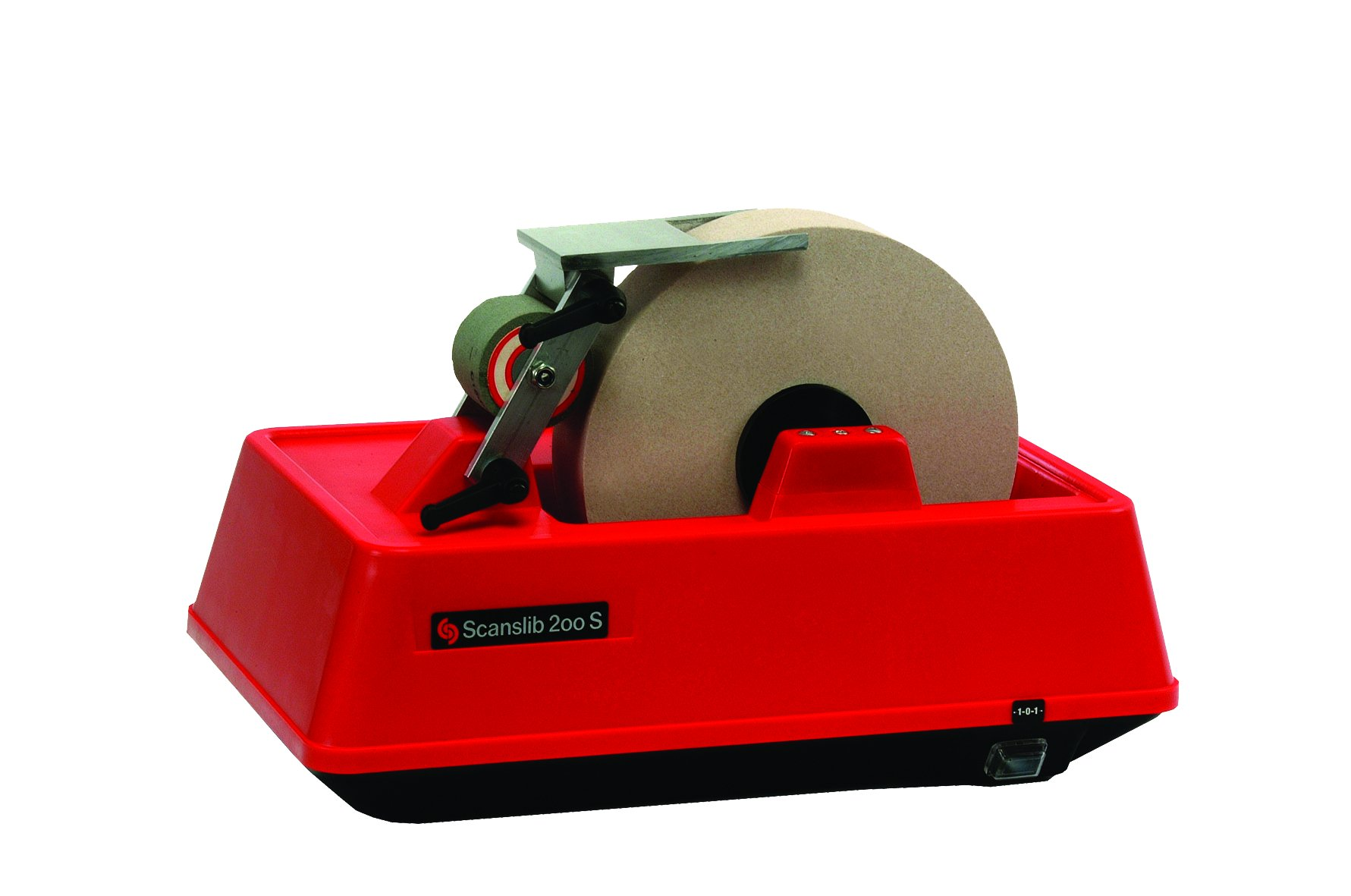
A modern wetgrinder

A blade's grind is its cross-sectional shape in a plane normal to the edge. Grind differs from blade profile, which is the blade's cross-sectional shape in the plane containing the blade's edge and the centre contour of the blade's back (meaning the shape of the blade when viewed from the side, i.e. clip point, spear point, etc.). The grind of a blade should not be confused with the bevel forming the sharpened edge; it more usually describes the overall cross-section of the blade, not inclusive of the beveled cutting edge which is typically of a different, less acute angle as the bevel ground onto the blade to give it a cross-sectional shape. For example, the famous Buck 110 hunting knife has a "hollow ground" blade, with concave blade faces (which aid in slicing through materials), but the cutting edge itself is a simple, flat-ground bevel of lesser angle. It would be difficult, if not impossible, to put a "hollow grind" onto the actual cutting edge of the blade itself, which is a very narrow and small bevel.

== Grinding ==
Grinding is the process of creating grinds. It involves removing significant portions of material from a blade, which distinguishes it from honing and polishing. Blades are ground during their initial sharpening or after having been sufficiently damaged, such as by breaking a tip, chipping, or extensive corrosion. Well-maintained blades need grinding less frequently than neglected or maltreated ones do.

Edge angle and included angle typically characterize a blade's grind. An edge angle is measured between a line lying in the plane of one of the edge's faces and a second line intersecting the back's centre contour, both lines lying in the same plane normal to the edge. The included angle is the sum of the edge angles. Ceteris paribus, the smaller the included angle, the sharper the blade and the more easily damaged its edge.

An appropriate grind depends upon a blade's intended use and the material composing it. Knife manufacturers may offer the same blade with different grinds and blade owners may choose to regrind their blades to obtain different properties. A trade-off exists between a blade's ability to take an edge and its ability to keep one. Some grinds are easier to maintain than others, better retaining their integrity as repeated sharpening wears away the blade. Harder steels take sharper edges, but are more brittle and hence chip more easily, whereas softer steels are tougher. The latter are used for knives such as cleavers, which must be tough but do not require a sharp edge. In the range of blade materials' hardnesses, the relationship between hardness and toughness is fairly complex and great hardness and great toughness are often possible simultaneously.

As a rough guide, Western kitchen knives are generally double-bevelled (about 15° on the first bevel and 20°–22° on the second), whereas East Asian kitchen knives, made of harder steel and being either wedge- (double-ground) to 15°–18° or chisel-shaped (single-ground) to 20°–30°.

Care should be taken to avoid confusing the grind of the blade as describing its cross-section and the angle that is ground onto the edge to form a cutting edge. It is very rare to have a knife with a single ground angle forming both the profile and the cutting edge (the exception being perhaps straight razors). For example, the famous Buck 110 folding hunting knife is described as having a "hollow grind" - meaning the faces of the blade are ground into a concave – but the blade also contains a second, less acute, conventional bevel that makes up the cutting edge. A classic Opinel folding knife has a "flat grind" blade, meaning that the faces of the blade are flat, without convexity or concavity, tapering towards the cutting edge: but the actual cutting edge is again formed of another, less acute bevel ground on the narrow edge. A classic Morakniv has a saber or "Scandi" grind, with flat, perpendicular sides on the body, with a secondary bevel formed below to create a tapered edge, but again, the actual cutting edge comprises a third, less-acute bevel. Thus the "grind" of the blade most often refers to the overall cross-section of the blade and should not be confused with the actual style of cutting edge put in the blade, even though this cutting edge is created by grinding as well. If the cutting edge was included in the description of the "grind", the vast majority of blades would have to be described as "compound angle grind". And of course one can purchase an unsharped blade in any style grind you desire, and there is rarely need to grind the entire surface of the blade to create a cutting edge.

== Process ==
A sharp object works by concentrating forces which creates a high pressure due to the very small area of the edge, but high pressures can nick a thin blade or even cause it to roll over into a rounded tube when it is used against hard materials. An irregular material or angled cut is also likely to apply much more torque to hollow-ground blades due to the "lip" formed on either side of the edge. More blade material can be included directly behind the cutting edge to reinforce it, but during sharpening some proportion of this material must be removed to reshape the edge, making the process more time-consuming. Also, any object being cut must be moved aside to make way for this wider blade section, and any force distributed to the grind surface reduces the pressure applied at the edge.

One way around this dilemma is to use the blade at an angle, which can make a blade's grind seem less steep, much as a switchback makes a trail easier to climb. Using the edge in this way is made easier by introducing a curve in the blade, as seen in sabers, tulwars, shamshirs, and katanas, among many others. Some old European swords (most memorably Hrunting) and the Indonesian style of kris have a wavelike shape, with much the same effect in drawing or thrusting cuts.

If it is required to measure the angles of cutting edges, it is achieved by using a goniometer, or blade edge protractor.

== Typical grinds ==
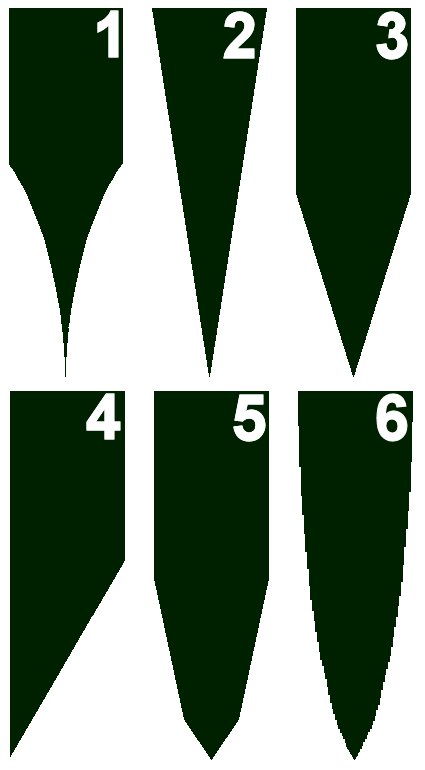
Blade cross-sections for typical grinds

Typical grinds include:

1. Hollow grind: A knife blade ground to create a characteristic concave, beveled cutting edge. This is characteristic of straight razors, used for shaving, and yields a very sharp but weak edge, which requires stropping for maintenance.
2. Flat grind: The blade tapers all the way from the spine to the edge from both sides. A lot of metal is removed from the blade, so it is thus more difficult to grind, which is one factor that limits its commercial use. It sacrifices edge durability in favor of more sharpness. A true flat-ground knife having only a single bevel is somewhat of a rarity (meaning that usually "flat grind" just describes the general shape of the blade, while there is a second, more conventional bevel ground creating the actual cutting edge, although this is generally true of most blade shapes; few knives are ground with one bevel angle comprising both the blade shape and the cutting edge).
3. Sabre grind: Similar to a flat grind blade, except that the bevel starts at about the middle of the blade, not the spine. Also sometimes referred to as a "V grind", made with strength in mind and found on tactical and military knives. A Sabre grind without a secondary bevel is called a "Scandinavian (Scandi) grind", which is easier to sharpen due to the large surface. The Finnish puukko is an example of a Scandinavian-ground knife.
4. Chisel grind: As on a chisel, a single bevel-ground is only on one side, (ground often at an edge angle of about 20°–30°); the other remains flat. As many Japanese culinary knives tend to be chisel-ground, they are often sharper than a typical double-bevelled Western culinary knife; a chisel grind has only a single edge angle; if a sabre-ground blade has the same edge angle as a chisel grind, it still has angles on both sides of the blade centreline, and so has twice the included angle. Knives that are chisel-ground come in left- and right-handed varieties, depending upon which side is ground. The flat side should be on the inside of the cut. Japanese knives feature subtle variations on the chisel grind. Firstly, the back side of the blade is often concave, to reduce drag and adhesion, so the food separates more cleanly; this feature is known as urasuki. Secondly, the kanisaki deba, used for cutting crab and other shellfish, has the grind on the opposite side (left side angled for right-handed use), so that the meat is not cut when chopping the shell. Chisel grinds excel in knives, where the top priority is getting the deepest cut and penetration with the least effort, but do wander when cutting rigid materials like cardboard and rubber.
5. Double bevel or compound bevel: A back bevel, similar to a sabre or flat grind, is put on the blade behind the edge bevel (the bevel which is the foremost cutting surface). This back bevel keeps the section of blade behind the edge thinner, which improves cutting ability. Being less acute at the edge than a single-bevel grind, it sacrifices sharpness for resilience: such a grind is much less prone to chipping or rolling than a single-bevel blade. This profile is commonly found in Japanese swords, such as the familiar katana. The shape of the bevel is much more efficient in reducing drag than the sabre grind typically found on Western sword blades. In practice, double bevels are common in a variety of edge angles and back bevel angles, and Western kitchen knives generally have a double bevel, with an edge angle of 14–16° (included angle of 28–32°) and a maximum of 40° as specified by International standard ISO 8442.1 (knives for the preparation of food).
6. Convex grind: Rather than tapering with straight lines to the edge, the taper is curved, though in the opposite manner to a hollow grind. Such a shape keeps a lot of metal behind the edge, making for a stronger edge while still allowing a good degree of sharpness. This grind can be used on axes and is sometimes called an axe grind. As the angle of the taper is constantly changing, this type of grind requires some degree of skill to reproduce on a flat stone. Convex blades usually need to be made from thicker stock than other blades. This is also known as hamaguriba in Japanese kitchen knives, both single- and double-beveled. Hamaguriba means "clam-shaped edge".

It is possible to combine grinds or produce other variations. For example, some blades may be flat-ground for much of the blade but be convex ground towards the edge.

== See also ==
- Blade geometry
