= Bill Fuller (footballer) =

English footballer

Personal information
- Date of birth: 6 April 1944 (age 82)
- Place of birth: Brixton, Greater London
- Position: Defender

Youth career
- Crystal Palace

Senior career*
Years	Team	Apps	(Gls)
1963–1965	Crystal Palace	3	(0)
1965–1966	Wellington Town		
1966–1967	Margate	8	(0)
1967–1968	Bexley United		
- * Club domestic league appearances and goals

Bill Fuller (born 6 April 1944) is an English former footballer who played in the Football League for Crystal Palace as a defender. He also played non-league football for Wellington Town, Margate and Bexley United.

== Career ==
Fuller was born in Brixton and began his youth career at Crystal Palace signing professional terms in January 1963. He made his senior debut in the last game of the 1962–63 season; a 4–0 away win against Barnsley. He made one league appearance in the 1963–64 season, when Palace achieved promotion from the old Third Division, plus one in the League Cup. He made one appearance the following season in the Second Division and at the end of the season, moved into non-league football with Wellington Town.

In 1966, Fuller signed for Margate then playing in the Southern Football League, where he made eight appearances without scoring. He joined Bexley United the following season, but was released by the club in 1968.

== Personal life ==
Fuller also worked as an engineer alongside his non-league football career.
