= Fuller (artist) =

British artist (born 1980)

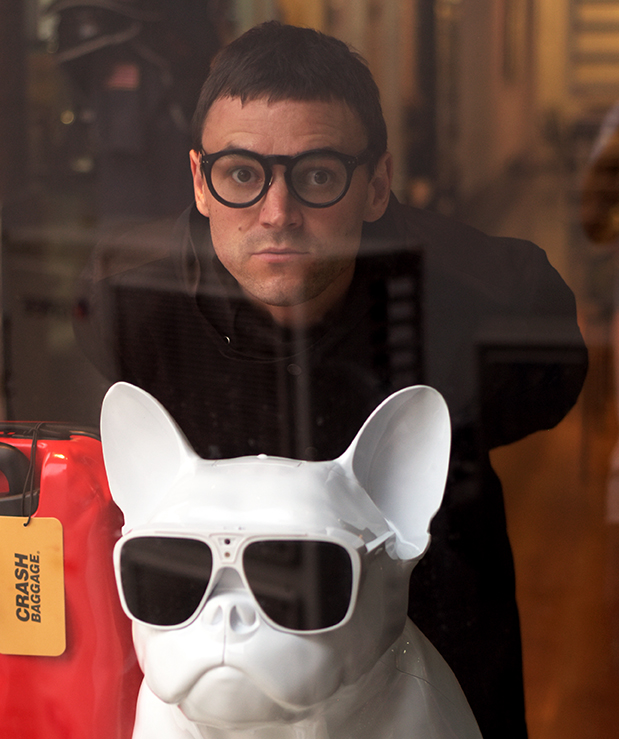
- Born: Gareth Fuller; 1980 (age 45–46); London, England
- Known for: Pictorial maps, drawing, cartography, psychogeography

Fuller (born 1980) is a British artist known for his intricate drawings and map art of cities and places that he explores. He drafts impressionistic "mind maps" of places where he has lived. Fuller is the pen name of Gareth Fuller of London, England, who was previously known as Gareth Wood. Fuller, who says he has always enjoyed exploring and getting lost, observes contemporary culture and investigates urban existence through his art, while telling stories, provoking conversation and "celebrating the identity of places in all their glory". Fuller became an Irish Citizen in 2018.

== Maps ==
=== London Town ===
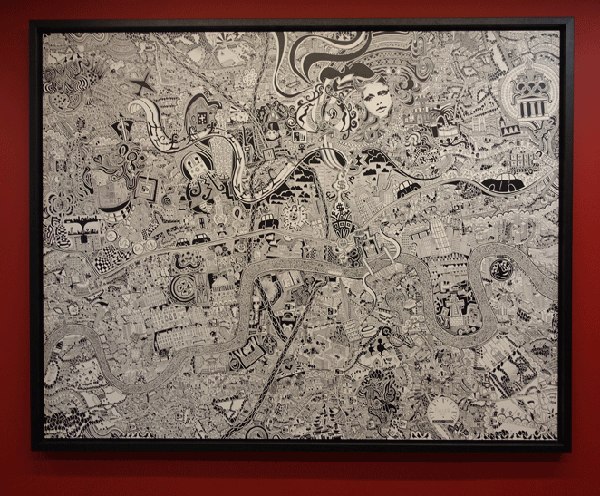
London Town by Fuller (2015)

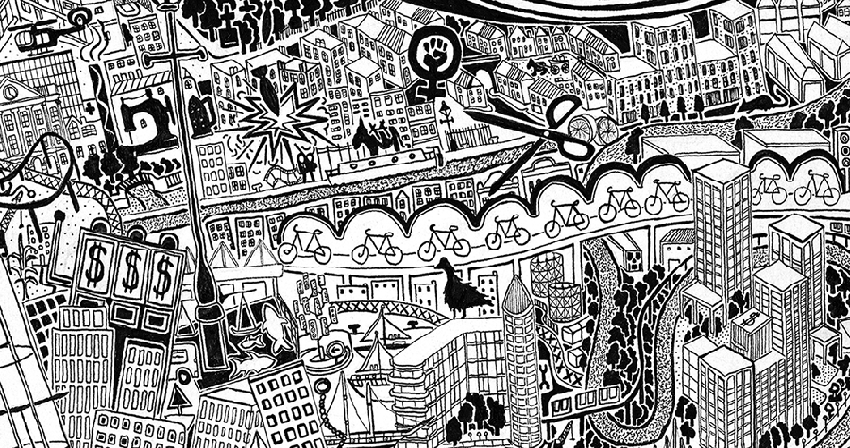
Detail taken from around the Limehouse Cut area in London Town by Fuller (2015)

Fuller's map of London, titled London Town, was drawn over a period of 10 years from 2005 to 2015. It was drawn with black ink on archival board. While drawing, he explored the city by cycling and walking, documented his research with photographs, made extensive notes and studied existing maps. London Town was unveiled in St Pancras railway station clock tower in London in 2015 and has been exhibited at the Royal College of Art, London. London Town has been acquired by the British Library for the national map collection.

=== Bristol ===
Fuller moved to Bristol in 2010 and completed his map of the city in 2014. The artist left one of the several hot air balloons on the artwork blank and publicly solicited opinions from residents of the city as to what they thought should be depicted on it. After many suggestions, Fuller chose to include the Children of the 90s project (ALSPAC). He said it was a "tough decision" but he had chosen Bristol University's "unique" medical research project because "like many other curiosities on the map it contains a story which people share." Lynn Molloy, from Children of the 90s, said: "The Children of the 90s balloon has been an iconic symbol in Bristol for over 20 years, so it's great to see it so firmly 'on the map'." , It is currently on permanent display in Bristol's M Shed Museum.

=== Beijing ===
Fuller's map of Beijing was unveiled in April 2018 at the Rosewood Hotel in Beijing's central business district. The artwork then went on public display at ART Beijing, an annual contemporary art fair that takes place at the city's Agricultural Exhibition Center. The artwork, which is simply titled Beijing, measures 1.2m x 1.5m and was drawn with black pigment ink on a cotton museum board.

Fuller first visited Beijing in 2014 for a cycle tour around the Great Wall of China and returned in 2017. He was based in Tongzhou district, researching and drawing the city. Over the course of several months he walked 1,385 kilometres, working his way into the heart of the city from its outermost ring road. This exploration of the city started in May 2017, when he spent 7 days walking approximately 220 km around Beijing's 6th Ring Road. Asked about his preparation for that journey, the artist responded: “The day I left I told a friend I had my flip flops and a bunch of bananas. That was close to the truth! My phone was my navigation tool." The artist created a WeChat group, called #WalkInProgress whose members followed his expedition and shared tips.

=== Quarantine ===
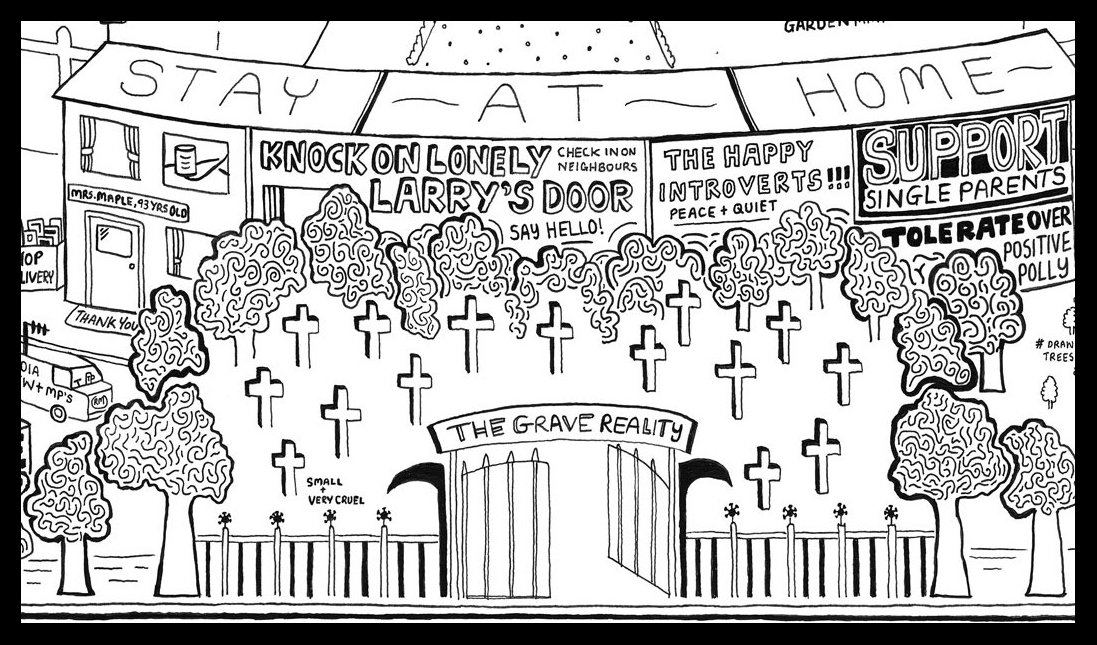
Detail taken from Quarantine + Survival Map by Fuller (2020)

Fuller was living in Beijing during the early stages of the COVID-19 pandemic. On March 3, 2020, he returned to the city from Kuala Lumpur to find that he was subject to 14 days of mandatory self-isolation under new government rules. Unable to do the walking-based exploration on which his artwork normally depends, Fuller decided to document the experiences and thoughts of each day spent inside his 590-square-foot apartment instead. The result is a series of 14 drawings entitled The Quarantine Maps.

In addition, the artist summarised his experience in a piece called Quarantine + Pandemic Survival Map. In an interview with The Guardian, he said he created this work because “I had this overwhelming feeling of helplessness after I came out of quarantine, and I felt so far from home. I started the tongue-in-cheek Quarantine + Pandemic Survival Map immediately after – I wanted to offer back all the things I’d been thinking about in a visual form.”

=== Washington D.C. ===
In July 2025, Fuller released an artwork of the Washington, D.C. and the Washington metropolitan area, known colloquially as the DMV. He spent three months embarking on walks, sometimes covering up to 35 miles per day, to carry out his research. The district's boundary stones, which marked the original borders of the city, served as his guide. He chose the city as his next project because “It was something I had to do, rather than going anywhere else. It’s the seat of power, which I think in the last five years has felt more relevant [to] somebody who’s not from the U.S.”.

== Collections ==
Editioned archival prints of Fuller's works have been added to numerous public and prestigious institutional collections. London Town has been acquired by the British Library for the national map collection and by the Museum of London for their permanent collection. Tom Harper, curator of antiquarian maps at the British library called London Town “one of the most personal pieces of cartography I’ve ever seen”.

Fuller's Bristol map has been acquired by Bristol Museum and Art Gallery for their historical map collection. The aim of this collection is to have a complete series of maps of the city. At present, the earliest map is Hoefnagle's 1581 map of Brightstowe and the latest is Fuller's 2014 map of Bristol.

== Other works ==
Duty Paid is a large scale collage work of flattened cigarette boxes. Fuller describes his piece as a “memento-mori”, saying “It’s actually an homage to the tobacco brands because there’s an element of nostalgia there”.

== Publications ==
- Mind the Map - Gestalten
