= Blade geometry =

Physical properties of a sword blade

The term blade geometry refers to the physical properties of a sword blade: cross-section (or grind) and taper.

== Blade geometry ==
Blade geometry is a crucial aspect of knife and sword design, influencing both the performance and usability of cutting tools.

== Cross-section ==
The cross-section of a blade is the primary way of determining its function and place in history.

=== Early Middle Ages ===
Early Viking and medieval European blades tended to have a lenticular cross-section. This type of design lacks a strong central ridge in the middle of the blade. The flexibility these blades have illustrates the purpose that they served as primarily cutting weapons that could also be used for thrusting.

=== Late Middle Ages ===
With the improvement in the defensive capabilities of armor in the High and Late Middle Ages, the cross-section of the sword blade adapted to suit the needs of warriors. Swords began to favour rigidity over flexibility as more rigid blades allowed for the stronger thrusts that were used to pierce armour. These blades were made with a diamond cross-section, which could be more or less acute, depending on the purpose of the blade. Weapons such as the estoc, for example, would have little to no cutting edge, but they would be very rigid and strong on the thrust. This is opposed by the longsword which was usually a multi-purpose weapon used for both thrusting and cutting.

The diamond cross-section could also be hollow ground for greater edge sharpness and thrust efficiency, while retaining strong central ridges.

== Taper ==
There are two types of physical blade taper: distal and profile.

Distal tapering refers to a blade's cross-section thinning from its base to its tip. This is used to create the handling characteristics of individual blades and the amount of distal taper varies depending upon the intended purpose of the blade. Many modern replica blades are not made with any distal taper, resulting in a blade that, when wielded, will feel unresponsive and heavy.

Profile taper refers to narrowing upon the edges of the flat of the blade. Blades with a more gradual taper are meant for cutting, whereas blades with an acute taper are usually meant for thrusting.
