= Charles Eugene Fuller =

American politician (1849-1926)

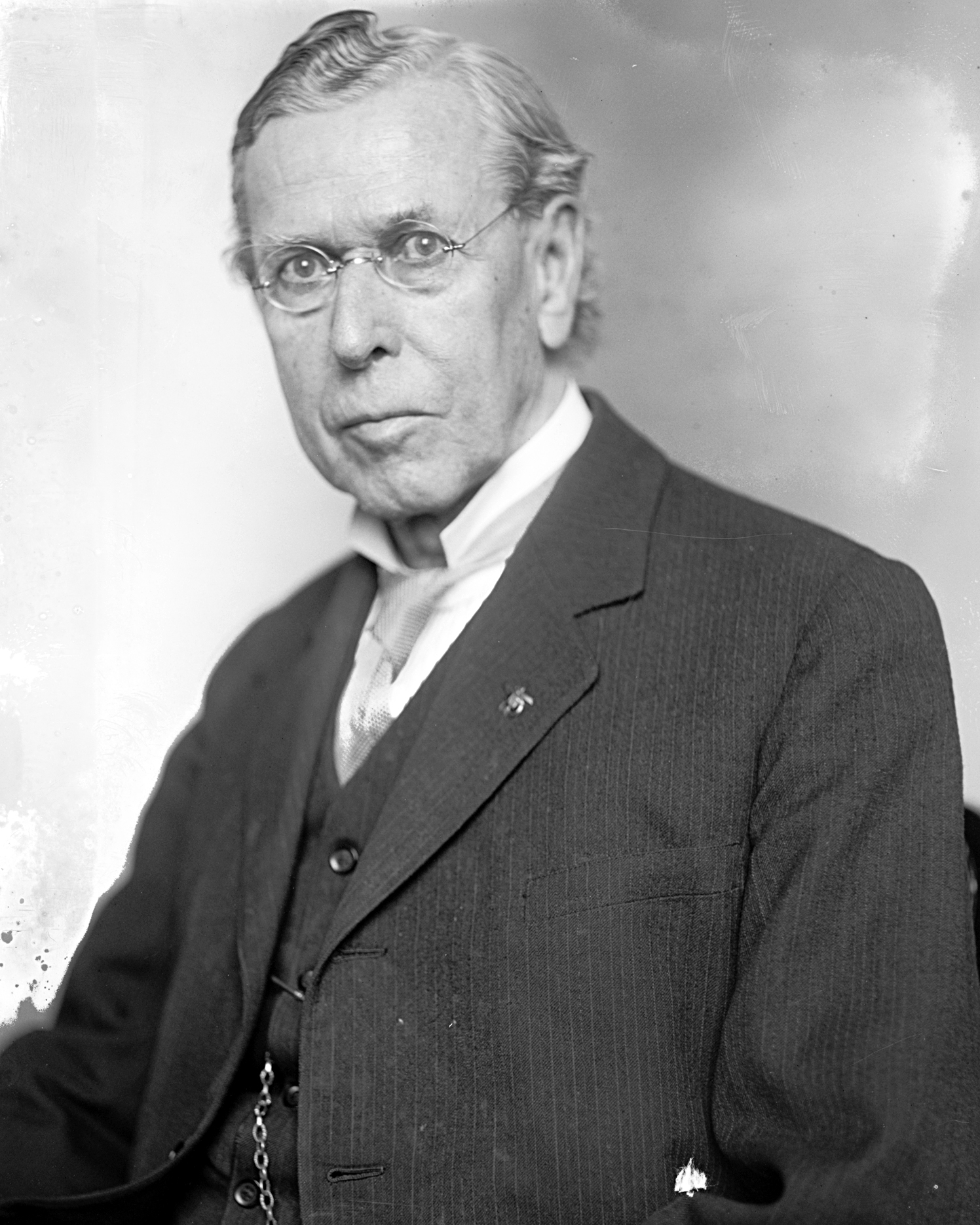

Member of the U.S. House of Representatives from Illinois's 12th district
- In office March 4, 1903 – March 4, 1913
- Preceded by: Joseph G. Cannon
- Succeeded by: William H. Hinebaugh
- In office March 4, 1915 – June 25, 1926
- Preceded by: William H. Hinebaugh
- Succeeded by: John T. Buckbee

Member of the Illinois House of Representatives
- In office 1882-1888

Member of the Illinois Senate
- In office 1878-1882; 1888-1892

Personal details
- Born: March 31, 1849 Belvidere, Illinois U.S.
- Died: June 25, 1926 (aged 77) Rochester, Minnesota U.S.
- Party: Republican

Charles Eugene Fuller (March 31, 1849 – June 25, 1926) was a U.S. representative from Illinois.

Born near Belvidere, Illinois, Fuller attended the common schools. He studied law. He was admitted to the bar in 1870 and commenced practice in Belvidere, Illinois. He was city attorney of Belvidere in 1875 and 1876 and served as prosecuting attorney for Boone County, Illinois 1876-1878. He served in the State senate 1878-1882; a member of the State house of representatives 1882-1888 and again a member of the State senate 1888-1892.

Fuller raised a provisional regiment for the war with Spain and was commissioned colonel of the Thirteenth Illinois Infantry by Governor John Riley Tanner. He served as judge of the seventeenth judicial circuit 1897-1903. He served as vice president of the People's Bank of Belvidere for many years.

Fuller was involved in the prosecution of serial killer Thomas Neill Cream in 1881 and in his pardon and release by Governor Joseph W. Fifer in 1891.

Fuller was elected as a Republican to the Fifty-eighth and to the four succeeding Congresses (March 4, 1903 – March 3, 1913). He was an unsuccessful candidate for reelection in 1912 to the Sixty-third Congress.

Fuller was elected to the Sixty-fourth and to the five succeeding Congresses and served from March 4, 1915, until his death at a hospital in Rochester, Minnesota, June 25, 1926. On April 5, 1917, he voted against declaring war on Germany. He served as chairman of the House Committee on Invalid Pensions (Sixty-sixth through Sixty-ninth Congresses). He was interred in Belvidere Cemetery, Belvidere, Illinois.

His brother DuFay A. Fuller also served in the Illinois General Assembly.

== See also ==
- List of members of the United States Congress who died in office (1900–1949)

U.S. House of Representatives
Preceded by Joseph G. Cannon	Member of the U.S. House of Representatives from Illinois's 12th congressional district March 4, 1903 – March 3, 1913	Succeeded by William H. Hinebaugh
Preceded by William H. Hinebaugh	Member of the U.S. House of Representatives from Illinois's 12th congressional district March 4, 1915 – June 25, 1926	Succeeded by John T. Buckbee
