= Edward Fuller (U.S. Marine Corps officer) =

- Born: September 4, 1893; Hamilton, Virginia
- Died: June 12, 1918 (aged 24); Belleau Wood near Marne River, France
- Burial place: United States Naval Academy Cemetery, Annapolis, Maryland
- Military career
- Allegiance: United States of America
- Branch: United States Marine Corps
- Rank: Captain
- Nickname: "Ted"
- Units: 1st Battalion, 6th Marine Regiment, 4th Marine Brigade, 2nd Infantry Division, American Expeditionary Forces
- Conflicts: World War I: Battle of Belleau Wood †
- Awards: Navy Cross; Distinguished Service Cross; Silver Star; Purple Heart

Edward Canfield Fuller (September 4, 1893 – June 12, 1918) was an officer in the United States Marine Corps and the son of General Ben Hebard Fuller.

== Biography ==
Born in Hamilton, Virginia, Fuller was a member of the Naval Academy class of 1916, and was commissioned in the Marine Corps upon graduation.

Captain Fuller was killed in action in the Battle of Belleau Wood in France June 12, 1918 during World War I.

According to his citation he died while fearlessly exposing himself in an artillery barrage in order to get his men into a safer position. He was posthumously awarded the Distinguished Service Cross by the Army for his selfless sacrifice for his men.

== Awards and decorations ==
=== Navy Cross ===

Edward Canfield Fuller
Rank and organization: Captain, U.S. Marine Corps, 75th Company, 1st Battalion, 6th Marine Regiment, 4th Marine Brigade, 2nd Infantry Division, American Expeditionary Forces.
Place and date: Bois-de-Belleau, France, 12 June 1918.
Born: September 4, 1893, Hamilton, Virginia

CITATION:

The President of the United States of America takes pride in presenting the Navy Cross (Posthumously) to Captain Edward Canfield Fuller (MCSN: 0-2395), United States Marine Corps, for extraordinary heroism while serving with the 6th Regiment (Marines), 2d Division, A.E.F. in action in the attack on Bois-de-Belleau, France, 12 June 1918. While fearlessly exposing himself in an artillery barrage for the purpose of getting his men into a position of security in the attack on Bois-de-Belleau, Captain Fuller was killed and thereby gave his life in an effort to protect his men.

=== Distinguished Service Cross ===
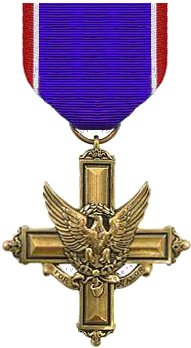

Edward Canfield Fuller
Rank and organization: Captain, U.S. Marine Corps, 75th Company, 1st Battalion, 6th Marine Regiment, 4th Marine Brigade, 2nd Infantry Division, American Expeditionary Forces.
Place and date: Bois-de-Belleau, France, 12 June 1918.
General Orders: War Department, General Orders No. 99 (1919)
Born: September 4, 1893, Hamilton, Virginia

CITATION:

The President of the United States of America, authorized by Act of Congress, July 9, 1918, takes pride in presenting the Distinguished Service Cross (Posthumously) to Captain Edward Canfield Fuller (MCSN: 0-2395), United States Marine Corps, for extraordinary heroism while serving with the Sixth Regiment (Marines), 2d Division, A.E.F., in action in the attack on Bois-de-Belleau, France, 12 June 1918. While fearlessly exposing himself in an artillery barrage for the purpose of getting his men into a position of security in the attack on Bois-de-Belleau, Captain Fuller was killed and thereby gave his life in an effort to protect his men.

=== Silver Star ===
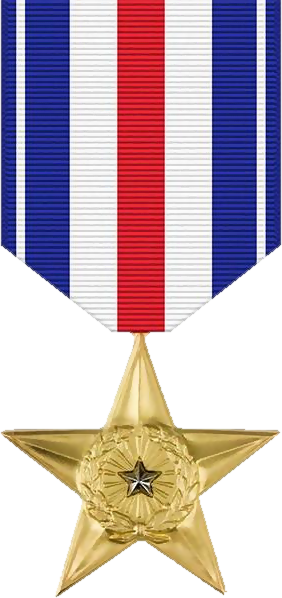

Edward Canfield Fuller
Rank and organization: Captain, U.S. Marine Corps, 75th Company, 1st Battalion, 6th Marine Regiment, 4th Marine Brigade, 2nd Infantry Division, American Expeditionary Forces.
Place and date: Chateau-Thierry, France, 6 June to 10 July 1918.
General Orders: Citation Orders, 2d Division, American Expeditionary Forces
Born: September 4, 1893, Hamilton, Virginia

CITATION:

By direction of the President, under the provisions of the act of Congress approved July 9, 1918 (Bul. No. 43, W.D., 1918), Captain Edward Canfield Fuller (MCSN: 0-2395), United States Marine Corps, is cited (Posthumously) by the Commanding General, American Expeditionary Forces, for gallantry in action and a silver star may be placed upon the ribbon of the Victory Medals awarded him. Captain Fuller distinguished himself while serving with the Sixth Regiment (Marines), 2d Division, American Expeditionary Forces at Chateau-Thierry, France, 6 June to 10 July 1918.

=== Commendations ===
Fuller has been awarded the following:

1st row	Navy Cross		Distinguished Service Cross
2nd row	Silver Star	Purple Heart	World War I Victory Medal with 1 silver and 1 bronze Service stars
Badges	Marine Corps Rifle Expert Marksmanship Badge (2nd award)		Marine Corps Pistol Expert Marksmanship Badge (2nd award)

== Honors ==
The destroyer USS Fuller (DD-297) was named for him.

In July 1918, a Marine Corps training camp in Paoli, Pennsylvania, located on the grounds where the American Revolutionary War Battle of Paoli was fought, was named for him.
