= DuFay A. Fuller =

American businessman and politician

Member of the Illinois Senate
- In office 1901–1905
- Constituency: 8th district

Member of the Illinois House of Representatives
- In office 1897–1901
- Constituency: 8th district

Personal details
- Born: February 21, 1852 Boone County, Illinois, U.S.
- Died: March 3, 1924 (aged 72) Belvidere, Illinois, U.S.
- Party: Republican
- Relations: Charles Eugene Fuller (brother)
- Occupation: Insurance agent

DuFay A. Fuller (February 21, 1852 – March 3, 1924) was an American businessman and politician who served in both chambers of the Illinois General Assembly.

== Early life ==
Fuller was born on February 21, 1852, in Boone County, Illinois, and attended public schools. His brother Charles Eugene Fuller later became a U.S. Congressman.

== Career ==
Fuller worked in the life insurance business and resided in Belvidere, Illinois, with his wife and family. He served on the local school board.

A member of the Republican Party, Fuller was elected to the Illinois House of Representatives from the 8th district, serving from 1897 to 1901 during the 40th and 41st General Assemblies. He was subsequently elected to the Illinois Senate, serving from 1901 to 1905 during the 42nd and 43rd General Assemblies. The 8th district at that time comprised Lake, McHenry, and Boone counties.

Following his legislative service, Fuller was appointed as an Illinois state parole officer.

== Death ==
Fuller died suddenly from a heart attack at his home in Belvidere, Illinois, on March 3, 1924.
