= The Butcher (TV series) =

American television series

- Genre: Reality
- Presented by: Colby Donaldson
- Judges: David Budworth; Roxanne Spruance; Michael Sullivan
- Composers: Erik Blicker, Glenn Schloss
- Country of origin: United States
- Original language: English
- No. of seasons: 1
- No. of episodes: 6

Production
- Running time: 42 minutes

Original release
- Network: History
- Release: May 22 – June 26, 2019

The Butcher is an American competition reality series that airs on the History Channel. In each episode, four butchers compete in a three-round elimination contest to test their butchering skills, with the overall winner receiving $10,000 and the day's championship title. The series is hosted by Colby Donaldson, with a three-judge panel consisting of David Budworth AKA Dave the Butcher, Roxanne Spruance, and Michael Sullivan, experts in the practice of butchering. The series premiered on May 22, 2019, with a six-episode first season. The series shares a similar format to its sister-show Forged in Fire.

== Set ==
The set, referred to as "The Shop," consists of a large workroom equipped with a range of hand and power tools for preparing meat, including saws, slicers, grinders, sausage stuffers, and one bandsaw that must be shared among the contestants. A large refrigerated walk-in meat locker adjoins the Shop. Each butcher is provided with his/her own workstation and a presentation table for laying out finished cuts, and must bring his/her own knives and scabbards.

== Format ==
In the first round of a typical episode, the four butchers are each presented with a whole animal carcass, suspended from overhead hooks in the meat locker. They have a set amount of time to accomplish two tasks. First, they must break the carcass down into large primal cuts without removing it from the hooks. Once each primal cut is removed, they must bring it out of the locker (or have stagehands bring it out if it is too heavy or unwieldy to move alone) and prepare as many retail-quality cuts as possible using their own knives and/or any other equipment in the Shop. In certain episodes, the butchers must follow additional restrictions on tools to be used during one or both portions of the round. Once time runs out, the judges inspect each butcher's cuts and reject any that are of inferior quality. The one who has produced the fewest acceptable cuts is eliminated. The series does not reference whether the contestants are given a list of retail cuts that are acceptable, but in each episode, one particular cut is highlighted, and any cuts that do not qualify as that cut are rejected even if they might be acceptable as a different type. (Note: For example, in one episode, a "tomahawk" rib steak was sought. Any steaks that did not include a long-enough rib bone were rejected entirely even though they might have still qualified as regular retail rib steaks.)

For the second round, the three remaining butchers are each given a supply of meat and must prepare a set number of items that meet a specific weight/size/thickness target. They must estimate the desired measurement of their items by eye and feel without the use of any measuring instruments. One judge measures each item but does not tell the exact result to the butcher, only stating whether it is over, under, or on target. Off-target items are rejected and/or returned to the butcher for further trimming, depending on the rules of the particular episode, (Note: Most commonly, under-sized items are rejected while over-sized items are returned and can be trimmed.) while on-target items must pass a quality inspection. The first two butchers to produce the required number of on-target, acceptable-quality items will advance.

In the third round, the two remaining butchers are each presented with the carcass of an exotic animal. They are given a set length of time to skin the carcass (if presented with skin still on) and prepare as many salable meat products/cuts as possible, including sausages and ground meat if they choose. As in the first round, the judges inspect the butchers' cuts and reject any that are of poor quality; in addition, they may choose to cook and taste selected cuts as a further criterion. Dollar values are assigned to the acceptable cuts based on weight, quality, and creativity; the butcher who generates the higher total value from his/her carcass wins the day's championship and the $10,000 prize.

=== Variations ===
In the first round of one episode, each butcher was presented with five birds: a squab, pheasant, chicken, duck, and turkey. They were required to debone and eviscerate the birds, remove the duck liver in as intact a condition as possible, and then stuff one bird into the next in order by size. The result was described as a modern version of a rôti sans pareil ("roast without equal") or a more intricate version of a turducken. The butchers were judged on the quality of their final product and the condition of the duck liver.

For the third round of a different episode, the butchers were each given three small carcasses instead of a single large one - a python, iguana, and nutria - and had to skin and prepare cuts from all of them within the time limit.

== Cast, judges, and producers ==
Colby Donaldson became a household name as the popular runner-up on the second season of Survivor in 2001. He has since hosted History show competition shows Top Shot and the spinoff Top Guns.

David Budworth and Michael Sullivan are professional butchers and are presented as experts in the butchering industry. Sullivan has worked at various chef positions for many years before starting his own company producing meat products. David Budworth,known professionally as Dave the Butcher, has been butchering for over 30 years and currently runs a shop in San Francisco. He also teaches butchering classes.

Roxanne Spruance is a professional chef in New York City, having received a number of critical accolades. She has a Bachelor of Science in environmental biology/zoology and another in fisheries and wildlife. Her expertise in butchery is not as a professional butcher, but as an avid outdoorswoman; specifically hunting, and butchering/preparing the animals she hunts, as well as her experience preparing meat as a chef. Her education also contributes to her knowledge of animal biology.

== Production ==
The series shoots in California. Each round of competition is shot on a separate day. According to one contestant, the series provides top-of-the-line and safe equipment for the contestants.

An on-screen announcement at the start of each episode states that all meat used in the competition is donated to animal rescue shelters afterward.

== Episodes ==
=== Season 1 (2019) ===
Episode	Airdate	Title	Challenges			Results			
Episode	Airdate	Title	1st round	2nd round	3rd round	1st place	2nd place	3rd place	4th place
1	May 22, 2019	"Meat the Monster"	Pig using hogsplitter	Steaks by weight	Alligator	Dan	Brianna	Brandon	Joey
2	May 29, 2019	"The Invader"	Beef without power saws	Bacon by weight, slicing one order by machine and the others by hand	Python, nutria & iguana	Matt	Tyler	Chris	Tiffany
3	Jun 5, 2019	"A Poultry Sum"	Bison with tomahawks	Sausages by length	Ostrich	Sean Kelly	Johnny Escobedo	Randy Radley	Penny Barend
4	Jun 12, 2019	"Opah"	Roast without equal	Hamburger patties by weight	Opah	James	Alan	McCullough Kelly-Willis	Chris
5	Jun 19, 2019	"Raising the Steaks"	Axis deer with flint knife	Steaks by thickness	Wild boar	Chris	Seth	Cindy	Armand
6	Jun 26, 2019	"The Beast"	Lamb with kopis	Beef stew meat, pork chops, chuck roast (all by weight)	Elk	Tim	Eagle	Jules	Lothar

== See also ==
- World Butchers Challenge
