= Jess Pryles =

Australian chef, television show host

- Born: Jess Pryles; Melbourne, Australia
- Culinary career
- Cooking style: Barbecue, Grilling
- Television shows
- Aussie Barbecue Heroes *Hardcore Carnivore *Beat Bobby Flay
- Website: jesspryles.com

Jess Pryles is a US-based Australian chef, television show host, meat expert and a live fire cook. She co-founded the Australasian Barbecue Alliance. She is also the author of the books Hardcore Carnivore and Prime Cuts. She was born in Melbourne, Australia and now lives in Austin, Texas.

== Career ==
=== Early career ===
Pryles earned a degree in Communications before starting a blog called Burger Mary. The blog led to a website which focused on her own recipes. Pryles then toured Texas visiting butchers and ranchers, before co-founding the Australasian Barbecue Alliance. She moved to Texas in 2015.

=== American career ===
Pryles is the founder of Hardcore Carnivore, and has a cookbook of the same name. Her second book, Prime Cuts, published in 2026. She has served as a spokesperson for Gerber Knives, Lone Star Beer and Kingsford Charcoal and she is the opening presenter at the famed A&M Camp Brisket. In addition to slow cooked barbecue, and smoked meats, Pryles is considered an expert in live fire cooking. She also teaches workshops in how to cook meat with live fire.

In 2022, she completed a graduate course in Meat Science from Iowa State University.

=== Television ===
Pryles is a judge on the 2026 Food Network series, Pitmasters, where contestants compete in live fire challenges around the clock in a wilderness setting.

Her 10 episode TV show, titled Hardcore Carnivore, premiered on the Outdoor Channel in 2024. In the same year it was announced that they had begun filming for season two which aired in 2025. In 2026, she premiered a new show on Outdoor Channel, Feast by Fire, visiting prominent Texas BBQ joints.

Pryles was one of the hosts and judges of the television show Aussie Barbecue Heroes which is an Australian reality competition television series on the Seven Network. The series features nine teams competing in a series of barbecue cooking challenges for A$100,000 worth of prizes. Other hosts on the show include chef Ben O'Donoghue, and former My Kitchen Rules contestant Robert Murphy.

She has also been featured on "Beat Bobby Flay" as a judge, and "The Today Show", "SEC Nation" and SBS's "The Cookup" as a special guest.

Beginning in 2018, Pryles appeared in the pilot episode of Hulu's "BBQuest" series. Then in 2022 she went on to co-host Season 3 of the popular Texas-based barbecue show, alongside Kelsey Pribilski. Season three took a "beyond the pit" focus, shining a spotlight on ranches, cattle raisers and feed yards.

In 2023 she appeared as a special series judge on season 2 of TVNZ's series "Cooks on Fire", airing in New Zealand.

=== Appearances ===
2018: She was invited to barbecue on the front lawn of the Parliament of Australia by Red Meat Advisory Council for sitting members of parliament.

2021: moderated the Texas A&M barbecue panel at SXSW.

2022: host, World Butchers Challenge in Sacramento, CA.

2023: Pryles was the first chef invited to cook and host the inaugural Vivid festival Fire Kitchen at the famous Sydney Festival.

== Books ==
- Hardcore Carnivore
- Prime Cuts

== See also ==
- Barbecue
- Smoked meat
