= Cleaver =

Large, often squared off knife

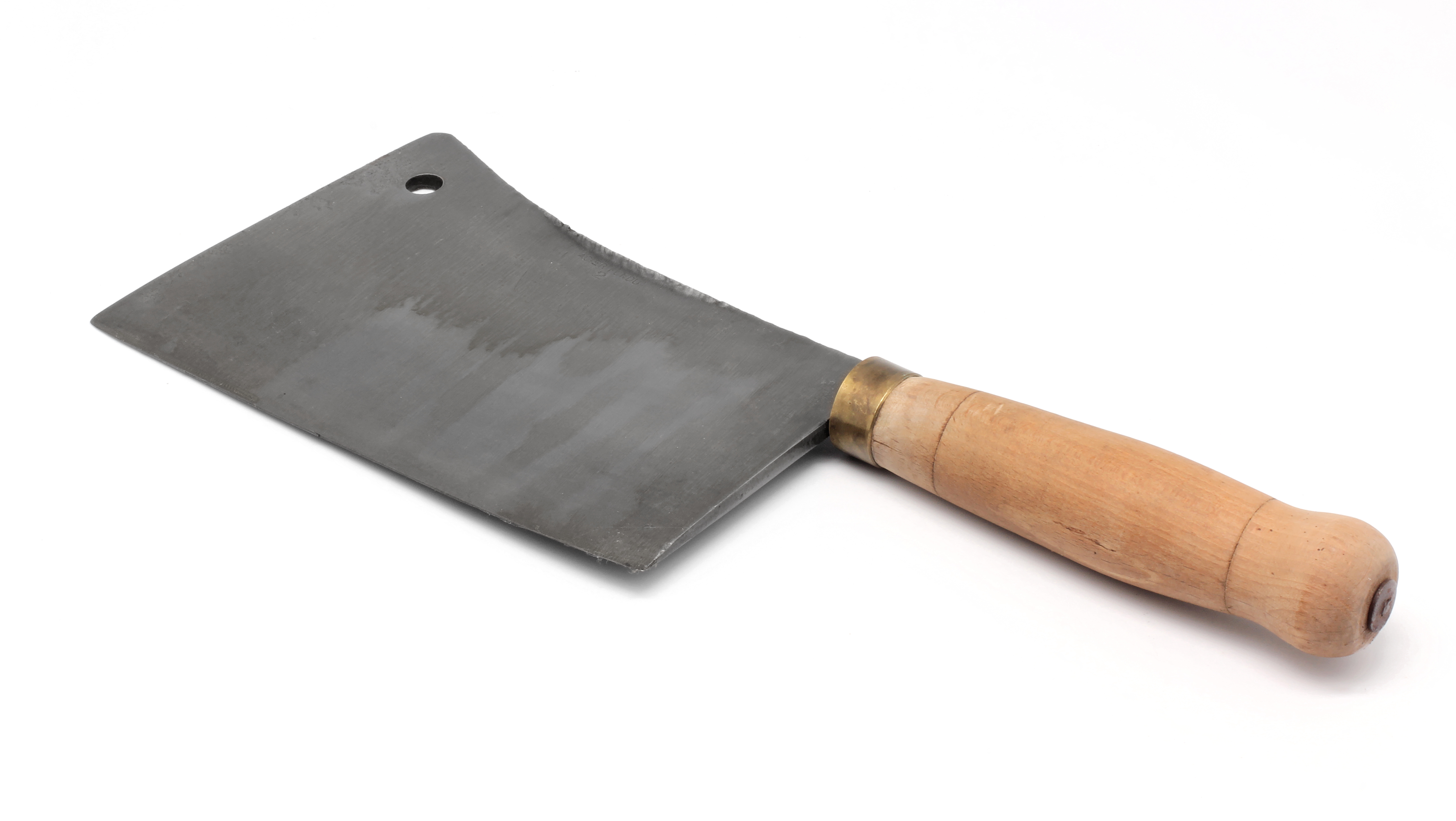
A modern wood-handled cleaver

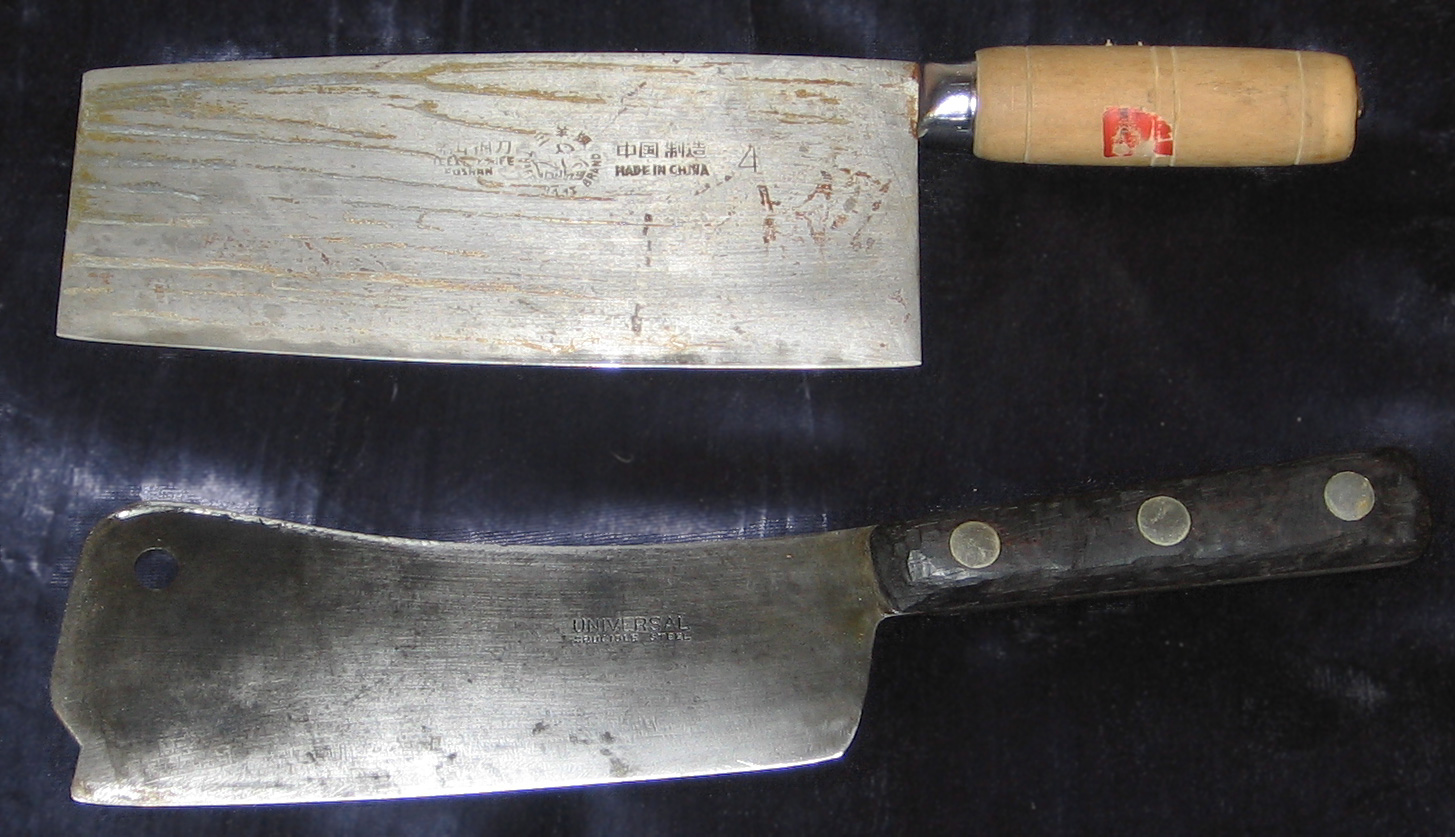
Chinese chef's knife (top) and old North American cleaver (bottom)

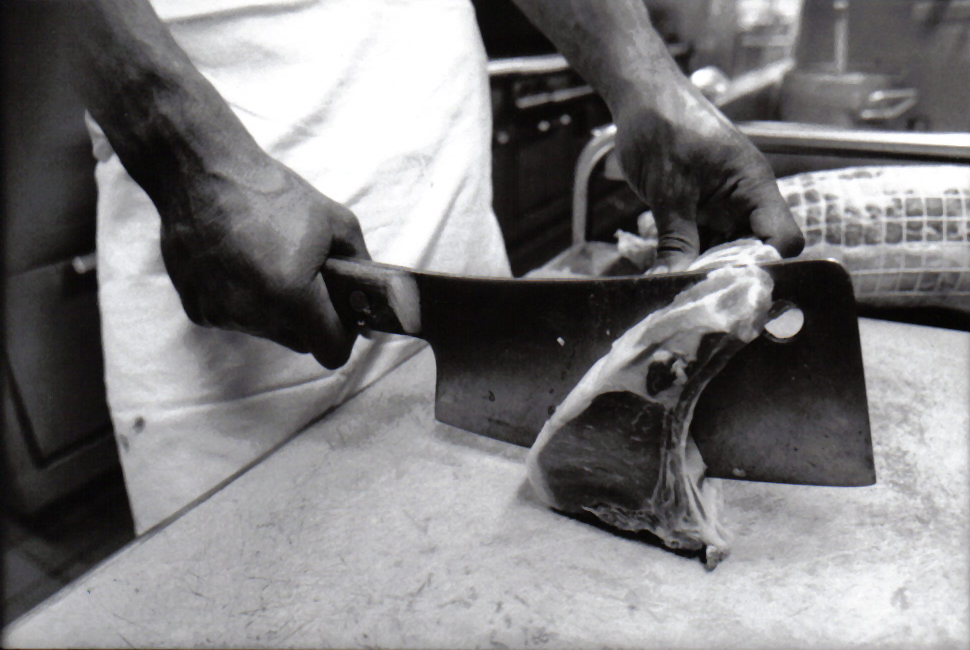
A cleaver in use, being used to cut pork chops from a loin of pork

A cleaver is a large knife that varies in its shape but usually resembles a rectangular-bladed tomahawk. It is largely used as a kitchen or butcher knife and is mostly intended for splitting up large pieces of soft bones and slashing through thick pieces of meat. The knife's broad side can also be used for crushing in food preparation (such as garlic) and can also be used to scoop up chopped items.

Tools described as cleavers have been in use since the Acheulean period. "Cleaver" was commonly spelled clever in the late 17th century.

== Design ==
In contrast to other kitchen knives, the cleaver has an especially tough edge meant to withstand repeated blows directly into thick meat, dense cartilage, bone, and the cutting board below. This resilience is accomplished by using a softer, tougher steel and a thicker blade, because a harder steel or thinner blade might fracture or buckle under hard use.

In use, it is swung like a meat tenderizer or hammer – the knife's design relies on sheer momentum to cut efficiently; to chop straight through rather than slicing in a sawing motion. Part of the momentum derives from how hard the user swings the cleaver, and the other part from how heavy the cleaver is. Because of this, the edge of a meat cleaver does not need to be particularly sharp – in fact, a knife-sharp edge on a cleaver is undesirable. The grind for a meat cleaver, at approximately 25°, is much blunter than for other kitchen knives.

The tough metal and thick blade of a cleaver also make it a suitable tool for crushing with the side of the blade, whereas some hard, thin slicing knives could crack under such repeated stress.

Some cleavers have a small hole, at the top front corner, for hanging them on a wall. A butcher does not typically lay them flat, as the blade may dull or get damaged.

== Use ==
Cleavers are primarily used for cutting through thin or soft bones and sinew. With a chicken, for example, it can be used to chop through the bird's thin bones or to separate ribs. Cleavers can also be used for preparation of hard vegetables and other foods, such as squash, where a thin slicing blade runs the risk of shattering.

Cleavers are not used for cutting through solid, thick and hard bones – instead a bone saw, either manual or powered, is used.

=== Cultural references ===
Cleavers occur with some frequency in traditional Chinese thought.

A story from the Zhuangzi on the proper use of a cleaver tells of a butcher who effortlessly cut ox carcasses apart, without ever needing to sharpen his cleaver. When asked how he did so, he replied that he did not cut through the bones, but rather in the space between the bones.

In explaining his ideal of junzi, Confucius remarked "Why use an ox-cleaver to carve a chicken?" on the futility of the common people seeking to emulate noblemen.

== East Asia ==
=== Chinese "cleaver" ===
The Chinese chef's knife is frequently incorrectly referred to as a "cleaver", due its similar rectangular shape. However, Chinese chef’s knives are much thinner in cross-section and are intended more as general-purpose kitchen knives, and mostly used to slice boneless meats, chop, slice, dice, or mince vegetables, and to flatten garlic bulbs or ginger; while also serving as a scraper to carry prepared ingredients to the bowls or the wok.

For butchering tasks and to prepare boned meats, there is a heavier Chinese "cleaver", used in similar fashion to the Western one.

=== Japan ===
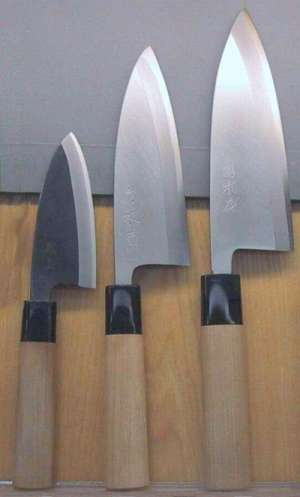
Deba bōchō of different sizes

In Japanese cutlery, the main knife to fill a similar role, is the light-duty deba bōchō, primarily for cutting the head off fish.
