= Aussie Barbecue Heroes =

- Title card of Aussie Barbecue Heroes
- Starring: Ben O'Donoghue; Robert Murphy; Jess Pryles
- Country of origin: Australia
- Original language: English
- No. of series: 1
- No. of episodes: 6

Production
- Production company: Seven Productions

Original release
- Network: Seven Network
- Release: 18 November – 22 December 2015

Aussie Barbecue Heroes (also known as Aussie BBQ Heroes) is an Australian reality competition television series on the Seven Network. The series features nine teams competing in a series of barbecue cooking challenges for A$100,000 worth of prizes. The series is hosted by television chef Ben O'Donoghue, who also acts as a judge alongside former My Kitchen Rules contestant Robert Murphy and Australasian Barbecue Alliance co-founder Jess Pryles.

== Broadcast ==
The series premiered on 18 November 2015 and continued to air through the summer non-ratings period on the Seven Network. From the fourth episode, the series moved from Wednesday nights to Tuesdays.

== Teams ==
Nine teams of two people with a pre-existing relationship will compete in the series.

| Team | Members | Relationship | Status |
|---|---|---|---|
| Shank Brothers | Mikey and Ralphy | Friends | Winners |
| Love Meat Tender | Becky and Ricky | Engaged | Runners up |
| Natural Born Grillers | Andrew and Pam | Couple | Eliminated (episode 5) |
| All about that Baste | Suzanne and Joanne | Neighbours | Eliminated (episode 5) |
| Flamin' Mongrels | Brett and Adrian | Friends | Eliminated (episode 4) |
| Running Hot | Greta and Dean | Friends | Eliminated (episode 4) |
| The Shanes | Shane and Shayne | Friends | Eliminated (episode 3) |
| Nice and Spicy | Priyanka and Rima | Friends | Eliminated (episode 2) |
| Country Champs | Annie and Veronica | Friends | Eliminated (episode 1) |

== Episodes ==
| No. | Title | Original release date | Australian viewers |
|---|---|---|---|
| 1 | Episode One | 18 November 2015 | 682,000 |
The Country Champs (Annie and Veronica), Running Hot (Greta and Dean) and the Shank Brothers (Mikey and Ralphy) go head-to-head in the first knockout round, where one team will be eliminated.
| 2 | Episode Two | 25 November 2015 | 465,000 |
The Natural Born Grillers (Andrew and Pam), Flamin' Mongrels (Brett and Adrian) and Nice and Spicy (Priyanka and Rima) compete in the second knockout round, where one team will be eliminated.
| 3 | Episode Three | 2 December 2015 | 479,000 |
The Shanes (Shane and Shayne), All about that Baste (Suzanne and Joanne) and Love Meat Tender (Becky and Ricky) compete in the final elimination heat, in a challenge to cook the perfect steak.
| 4 | Semi Final 1 | 8 December 2015 | N/A |
Flamin' Mongrels (Brett and Adrian), Running Hot (Greta and Dean) and Love Meat Tender (Becky and Ricky) compete in the first semi final, in a beachside challenge where only one team will progress to the grand final.
| 5 | Semi Final 2 | 15 December 2015 | 428,000 |
The remaining teams Shank Brothers (Mikey and Ralphy), The Natural Born Grillers (Andrew and Pam) and All about that Baste (Suzanne and Joanne) compete in the second and last semi final, where the winner will progress to the grand final to meet Love Meat Tender (Becky and Ricky).
| 6 | Grand Final | 22 December 2015 | 397,000 |
The Shank Brothers (Mikey and Ralphy) and Love Meat Tender (Becky and Ricky) fire up the barbecue for the Christmas grand final, where we will find out whose barbeque will reign supreme.

== See also ==
- List of Australian television series
- List of cooking shows
- Barbecue in Australia
