= Meat cutter =

Food service occupation

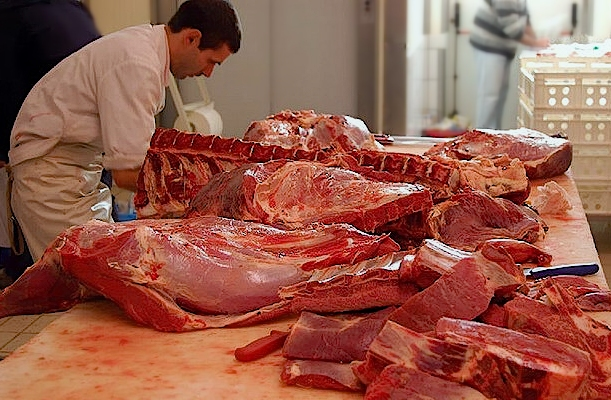
A meat cutter at work

A meat cutter is a person who prepares primal cuts into a variety of smaller cuts intended for sale in a retail environment. The duties of a meat cutter largely overlap those of the butcher, but butchers tend to specialize in pre-sale processing (i.e., reducing carcasses to primal cuts), whereas meat cutters further cut and process the primal cuts per individual customer request.

In the U.S., the job title of "butcher" has been mostly replaced in corporate storefronts in the last two decades after customer trends showed that modern, particularly urban, customers increasingly associated the term with animal slaughter and unsanitary conditions (regardless of the condition of the store). With the advent of off-premises, pre-packaged, supermarket meat, many supermarkets now avoid mention of either cutting or butchering and simply call their meat cutters "Meat Department Associates", or similar. In the U.K., the term butcher is still used to describe a person who offers for retail sale meat ready for cooking by the customer. They will also prepare cuts, joints, etc., for the customer. Most U.K. corporate retailers still use the term butcher for their meat department operatives.

== Overview ==
A meat cutter is responsible to prepare standard cuts of meat (including poultry and fish) to be sold in either a self-serve or specialty counter. In the UK the term used for retail meat cutter, is still butcher. Retail meat cutters are found in a customer-oriented, retail environment. This can be anything from a small family-owned meat shop to a large international supermarket chain. Meat cutters are a registered trade. Industrial meat cutters are found in production-oriented facilities, and generally perform fewer tasks, but repeatedly.

The term "meat cutters" typically deal with "primal" cuts - segments of the carcass broken down into smaller (but still unfinished) pieces to make them easier to handle.

== Working conditions ==
Retail meat cutters traditionally work indoors, in large, refrigerated rooms, with temperatures ranging between 2 and –4 degrees Celsius. These environments are kept sanitary, and are washed every day with powerful antibacterial cleaners. In larger retail outlets or plant-facilities, working environments are generally equipped with power tools such as band saws and circular slicers. Meat cutters are also generally required to be in good physical shape; the duties of a meat cutter include standing for long periods of time, regularly lifting over 50 lbs, and working in cold conditions. Retail meat cutters also often have to deal with customers.

== Duties ==
The duties of a retail meat cutter often include the trimming of primal cuts, making ground meat out of trimmings from the primal cuts, ensuring meat cuts are displayed in an eye-catching manner and are of sufficient quality, and serving customized orders to customers. Retail meat cutters are also responsible to keep their working areas clean, and ensure that proper sanitization procedures are followed.

== See also ==
- Butcher
- Slaughterhouse
