= Caidao =

Type of knife similar to a cleaver

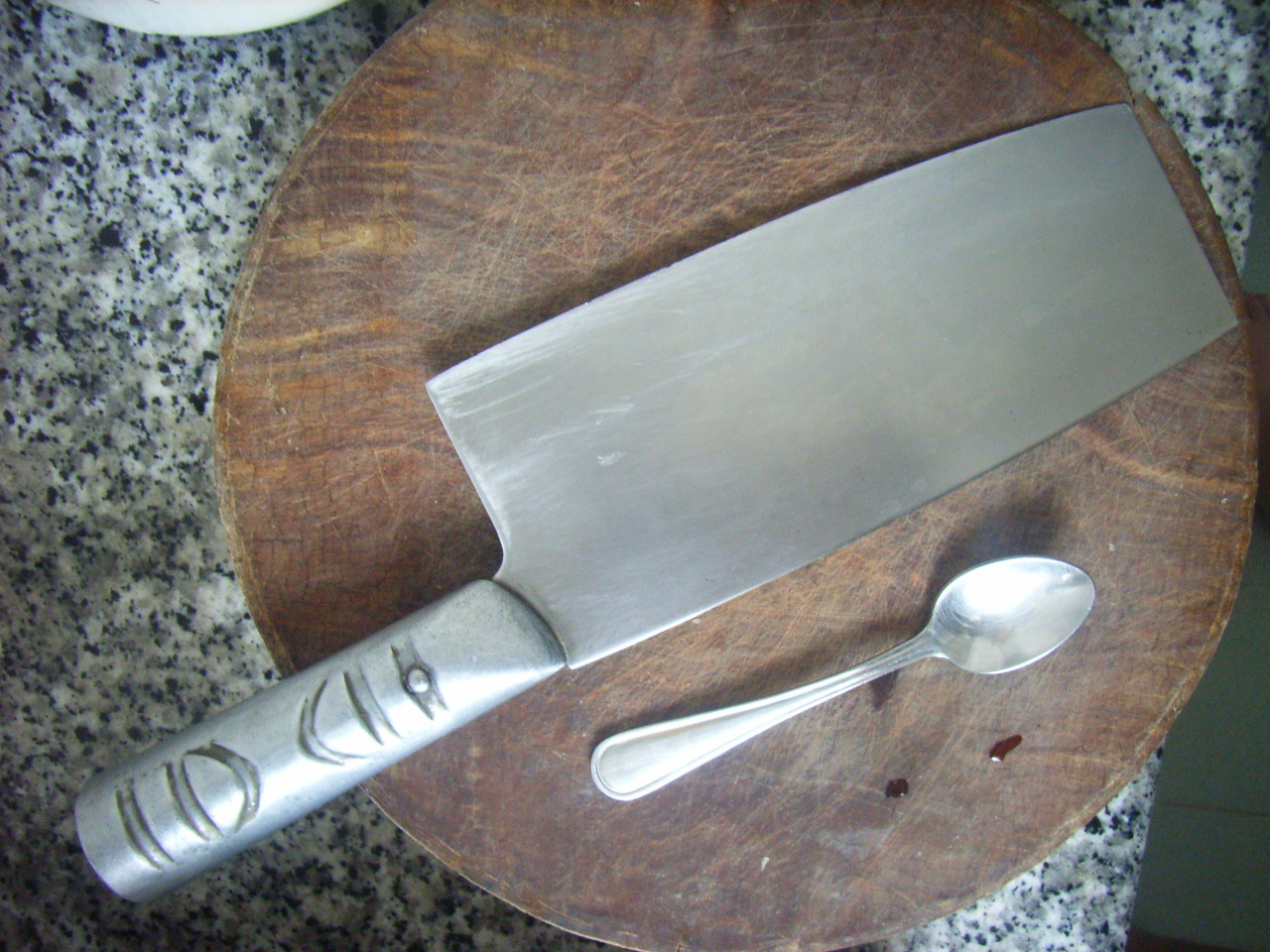
A Caidao next to a spoon

A Chinese chef's knife, sometimes referred to as a Càidāo (Chinese: 菜刀, lit. "vegetable knife"), is a Chinese, rectangular-bladed, all-purpose chef's knife used to prepare a variety of meats, fish and vegetables. The popularity of this style of knife has spread with the associated cuisines. They resemble Western cleavers in appearance, but most Chinese chef's knives are relatively thin-bladed and designed for slicing, finely chopping and mincing vegetables, fish and boneless meats; while also being used to flatten garlic bulbs or ginger and serving as a scraper to carry prepared ingredients to the bowls or the wok.

The Chinese chef's knife is frequently incorrectly referred to as a "cleaver", due its similar rectangular shape. The heavier gǔdāo (Chinese: 骨刀, lit. "bone knife") are produced and are used much like Western-type meat cleavers to prepare large sides of beef, pork and other boned meats. However, Chinese-style knives of this mass are not common in the West.

== Details ==
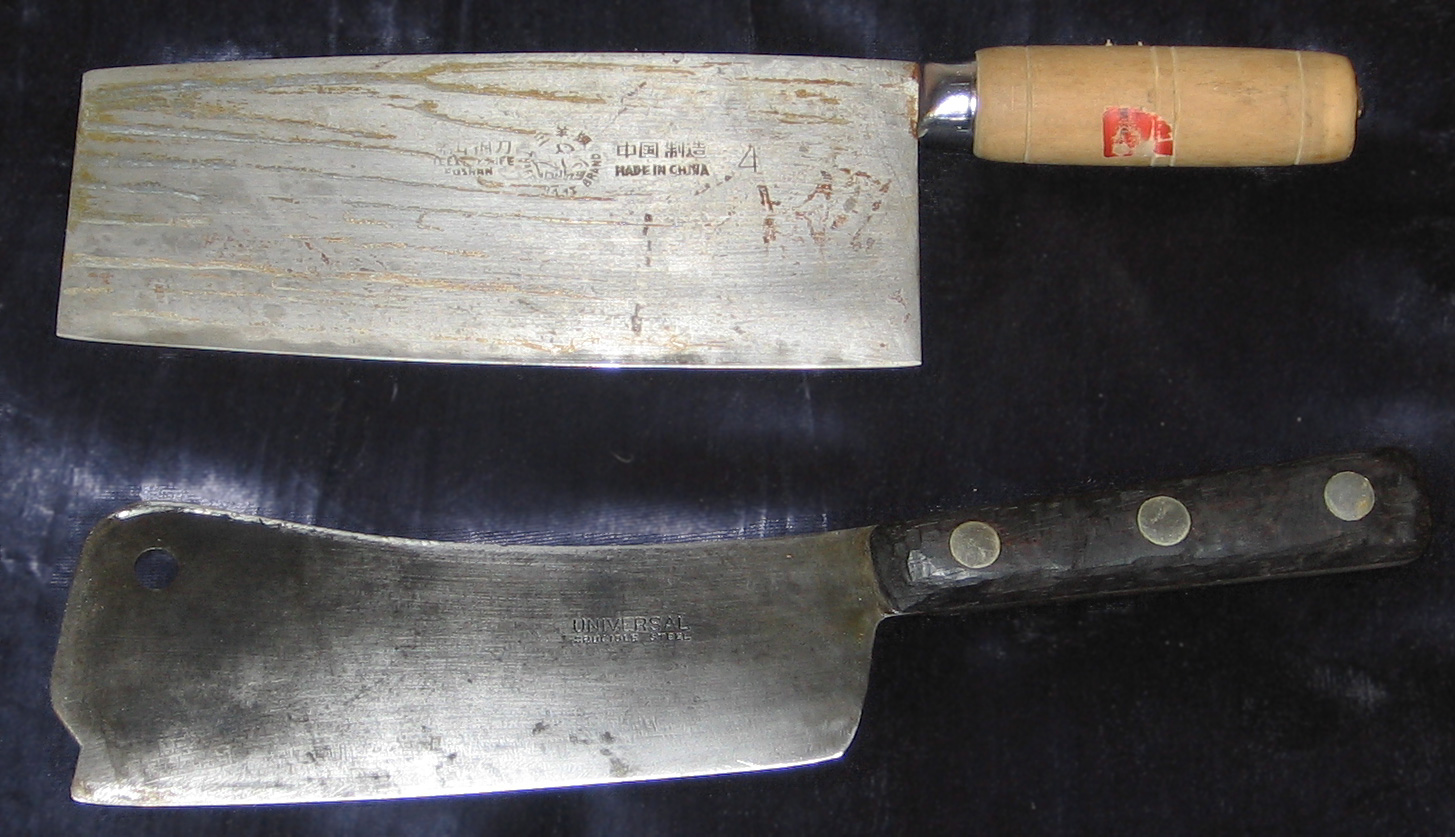
Chinese chef's knife (top) and old North American cleaver (bottom)

Caidao or so-called 'Chinese cleaver' is not a cleaver, and most manufacturers warn that it should not be used as a cleaver. It is more properly referred to as a Chinese chef's knife and is actually a general-purpose knife, analogous to the French chef's knife or the Japanese santoku. The confusion arises from the fact that Chinese chef's knives are rectangular and that some (particularly older, traditional knives made of carbon steel) have somewhat heavy blades. Also, the fact that the blade is heavier toward the tip encourages skilled Chinese chefs to use a swinging or "tapping" stroke as well as a "pushing" stroke. However, the edge has the gradual bevel of a chef's knife and will most probably be damaged if used for splitting bone. Actual cleavers in China have the same profile as chef's knives, but have much thicker blades with a sharp bevel and heavier handles.

Modern Chinese knives are sold under three general classifications throughout China: Caidao (slicers), choppers and Gudao (cleavers). The general distinction lies in the thickness of the blade. Choppers are the most common all-purpose Chinese knife. Choppers have thicker blades than slicers but are not as thick and heavy as cleavers. Choppers are used for slicing, chopping and mincing meat, vegetables and herbs. Choppers are suitable for chopping through thin soft bones such as fish and poultry. Slicers, referred to as Caidao (vegetable knives) by the Chinese have the thinnest and sharpest blades. Slicers may have the same shape as choppers or they may have less width and appear similar to Japanese Nakiri knives. Slicers are used for cutting vegetables, mincing herbs and slicing thin strips of meat for stir frying. The thin blade makes slicers unsuitable for chopping any bones. Cleavers, which are referred to as bone choppers by the Chinese have thick heavy blades. In Chinese homes, cleavers are typically used for chopping up pork ribs or for preparing hard-shelled seafood such as lobsters.

The average Chinese home uses some variation of the rectangular-bladed knife, usually around 18 to 28 cm (7 to 11 in) in length. Traditional knives had a simply-forged, carbon steel blade with a long, ground bevel, but the typical Chinese chef's knife is now a stamped blade. The traditional handle is a full-length tang that is only about 1 or 2 cm wide, which is passed through a metal cap, then through the center of a round, wood dowel, then bent over and hammered into the end of the handle to retain it. Newer models, particularly those made in Japan or Germany, have full-width tangs and riveted or injection-molded handles, but these handles generally retain something of the traditional, round cross-section. The wide blade of Caidao keeps the cook's fingers well off the cutting surface and the round handle gives a nice "pivot point" for the cutting stroke. The blade has a curvature or rocker along its edge that is generally uniform, improving the knife's ability to chop and mince meats and vegetables. The broad rectangular blade also serves to scoop up chopped food for transport to the wok or bowl. Although it may seem unwieldy, skilled practitioners worldwide may be observed using this style of knife for everything—even carving and fine work normally accomplished with a paring knife.

== See also ==
- Cleaver
- Kitchen knife
- Kinmen knife
