= World Butchers' Challenge =

International competition

The World Butchers' Challenge (WBC) is an annual international meat butchery competition where national teams of professional butchers compete in a timed challenges. The competition began around 2011 between Australia and New Zealand, where it was initially known as a Trans‑Tasman challenge.

== Champions ==
Winners
Year	1st	2nd	3rd
2025	Team France Boucherie	(Germany) The Butcher Wolfpack	(Australia) The Makani Australian Butcher Team
2022	(Germany) The Butcher Wolfpack	(Australia) The Makani Australian Butcher Team	(New Zealand) The Hellers Sharp Blacks
2018	(Republic of Ireland) Team Ireland		
2016	Team France Boucherie		
2015	(New Zealand) Pure South Sharp Blacks		
2014	(New Zealand) Pure South Sharp Blacks		
2013	(New Zealand) Pure South Sharp Blacks		
2012	(Australia) The Australian Steelers		
2011	(Australia) The Australian Steelers		

== See also ==
- World Barista Championship
