= Steak knife (disambiguation) =

A steak knife is a sharp table knife used for cutting steak or other meat. It may also refer to:

- Stakeknife, a spy
- Steakknife, a German punk rock band
