= Kitchen knife =

Knives intended for use in the process of preparing food

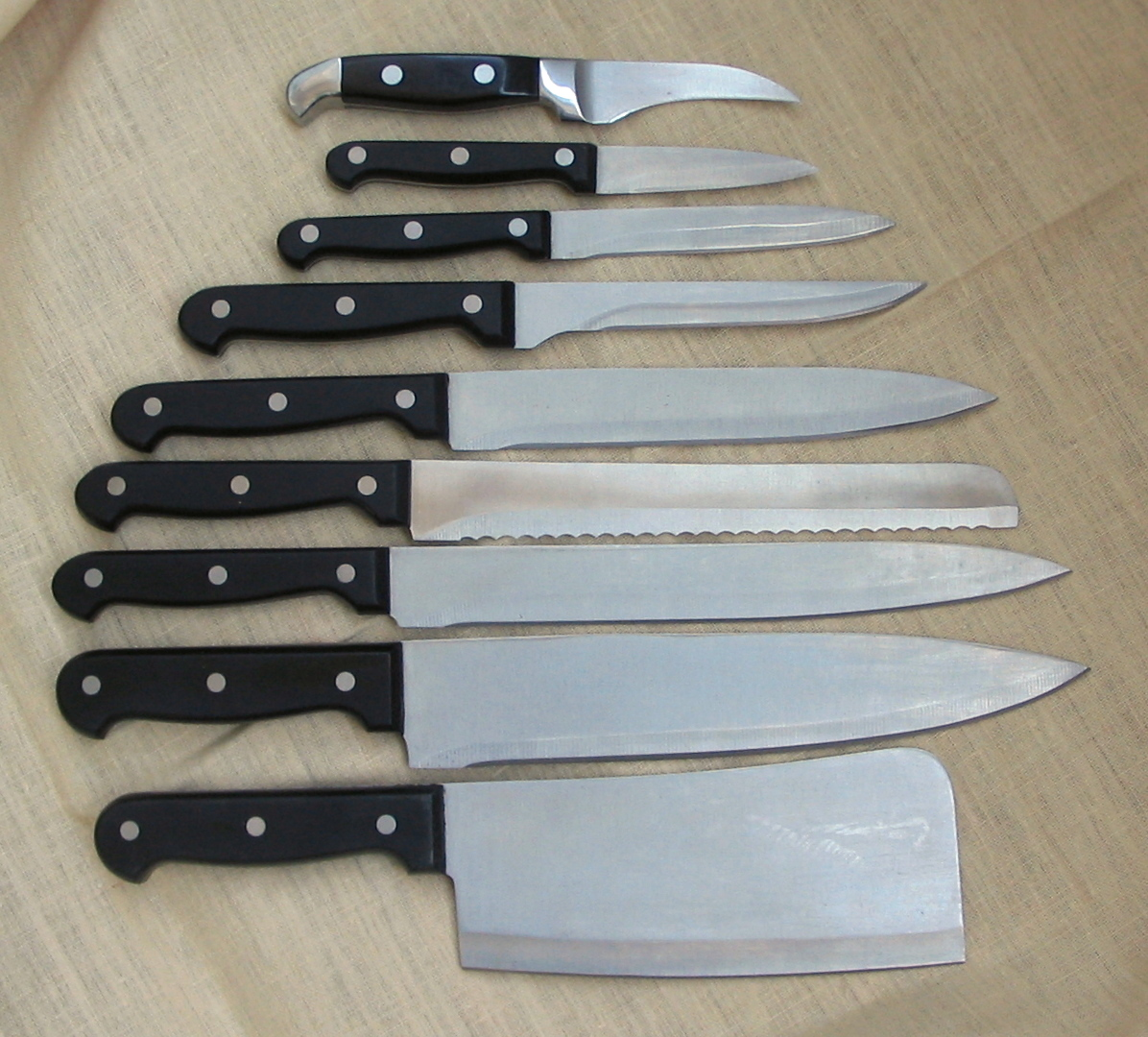
A selection of various typical Western knife types found in a domestic kitchen. From the top: tourné, paring, utility, boning, cook's, bread, carving, chef's knife, meat cleaver

A kitchen knife is any knife that is intended to be used in food preparation, as opposed to a table knife used when eating, as part of a set of cutlery. While much of this work can be accomplished with a few general-purpose knives − notably a large chef's knife and a smaller serrated blade utility knife − there are also many specialized knives that are designed for specific tasks such as a tough cleaver, a small paring knife, and a bread knife. Kitchen knives can be made from several different materials, though the most common is a hardened steel blade with a wooden handle.

Historically, knives were made in 'knife cities' that are noted for being the best at their production in that country with the pre-emininent, in Europe, being: Sheffield in Yorkshire, North of England; Thiers, Puy-de-Dôme in the Auvergne of France; Solingen in the Northern Rhineland of Germany; and Eskilstuna of Södermanland in Sweden. Each of these produced knives in a styles particular to the city, with Thiers especially being noted for the French point of Laguiole and steak knives. Whereas in Japan, there are many dispersed centres of kitchen knife production due to diversification that followed in wake of legislation restricting the production of sword-making. These are Tsubame-Sanjō in Niigata Prefecture, Seki in Gifu Prefecture, Sakai in Osaka Prefecture, Takefu-Echizen in Fukui Prefecture, and Tosa in Kōchi Prefecture amongst a number of others. Each area have their own style of knife, with Sakai in Osaka favouring the 'sheep's foot' or drop point, in contrast to the square-tipped style of Edo, modern-day Tokyo.

== Construction ==
=== Material ===
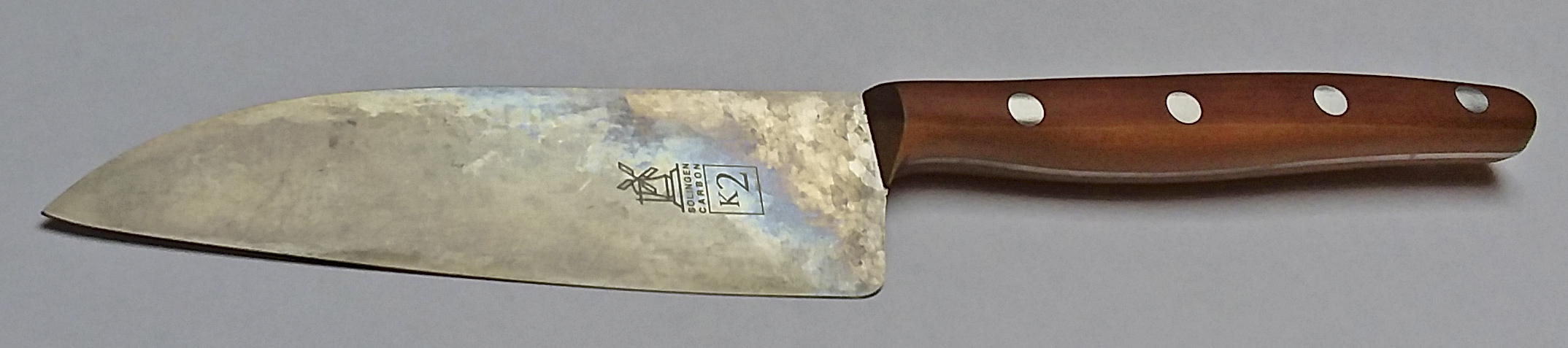
Kitchen knife made of carbon steel, HRC 61.5 with typical stains

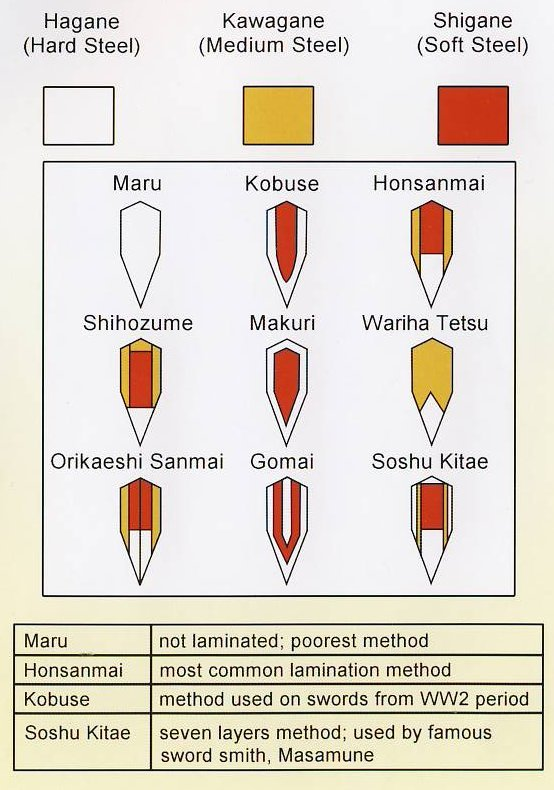
Laminated forms of various blade constructions including san mai (in upper-right and lower-left) versus basic mono-steel (upper-left) construction

- Steel is an alloy of iron and carbon is the most common among blade materials and comes in many forms:
  - Carbon steel is an alloy that often includes other elements such as vanadium and manganese. Carbon steel commonly used in knives has around 1% carbon (such as AISI 1095 − an American Iron and Steel Institute standard grade) that is inexpensive and holds its edge well. Good carbon steel will take a sharp edge, but is not so hard as to be difficult to sharpen, normally being easier to resharpen than many grades of stainless steels. The blades should be cleaned, dried, and lubricated after each use, but they are vulnerable to stains and rust, though over time, the steel will acquire a dark patina of oxidation which will prevent corrosion. New carbon-steel knives may impart a metallic or 'iron' taint to acidic foods.
  - Stainless steel is an alloy of iron, approximately 10→15% chromium, usually with nickel and molybdenum, with only a small amount of carbon. Typical stainless steel knives are made of 420 stainless, a high-chromium stainless steel alloy often used in flatware. Some stainless steels may be softer than carbon steel, but this makes it easier to sharpen. Stainless steel knives resist corrosion and rust far better than carbon steel knives.
  - High-carbon stainless steel is a stainless steel alloy with a relatively high amount of carbon compared to other stainless alloys. For example, AISI 420 grade stainless steel normally contains 0.15% by weight of carbon, but the 420HC variant used for cutlery has 0.4% to 0.5%. The increased carbon content is intended to provide the best attributes of carbon steel and ordinary stainless steel. High carbon stainless steel blades do not discolour or stain, and maintain a sharp edge for a reasonable time. Most 'high-carbon' stainless blades are made of more expensive alloys than less-expensive stainless knives, often including amounts of cobalt, molybdenum, vanadium, and other components intended to increase strength, edge-holding, and cutting ability.
  - Laminated steel blades combine the advantages of a hard, but brittle steel which will hold a good edge that can easily be damaged and chipped, with a tougher steel less susceptible to damage and chipping, but incapable of taking a good edge. The hard steel is sandwiched (laminated) and protected between layers of the tougher steel. The hard steel forms the edge of the blade; it will take a more acute grind than a softer steel, and will stay sharp longer. The core and the spine of the blade of soft steel − tough and resilient, but flexible − will normally make up most of the blade and the flats or sides will be either a medium or hard steel to give a good surface that can take finish, such as a hammered surface. All these blade sections are forge-welded together. In Japanese blades, this construction is known as san mai, (as seen in the upper right and lower left diagram examples on the table). Lamination can also be achieved through the time-consuming multiple folding of a two or more pieces of steel − at least one a high quality hard steel and another a tough and resilient soft steel − that is forge worked many times over, refolding until dozens of layers are made across the thickness of the blade and the surface is then acid-etched to bring out the pattern of marbling, as found in the high quality Damascus steel blades.

- Titanium is much lighter and highly corrosion-resistant, but not harder than steel. However, it is more flexible than steel, especially in alloy, when doped with elements like nickel. Titanium carbide and titanium nitride are both extremely hard and coatings or inclusions of these may be sintered in forging into the edge of the blade, but they are greatly prone to fracturing and chipping. Titanium does not impart any flavour to food. Typically, it is very expensive and not well suited to kitchen cutlery, so not widely available.

- Ceramic blades are made from sintered zirconium dioxide, and are extremely hard, but brittle, retaining their sharp edge for a long time. They are low in mass, do not impart any taste to food and do not corrode. They are suitable for slicing fruit, vegetables, and boneless meat. Ceramic knives are best used as a specialist kitchen utensil. Manufacturing improvements have reduced the brittleness, but because of their hardness and brittle edges, sharpening requires specialist equipment and techniques.

- Plastic blades are usually not very sharp and are mainly used to cut through vegetables, especially salads, without causing discolouration. They are often used for children's training knives as they are not sharp enough to cut deeply into flesh, but can scratch or even possibly cut skin.

=== Blade manufacturing ===
Steel blades can be manufactured either by being forged or stamped.

- Hand-forged blades are made in a multi-step process by skilled manual labor. A piece of steel alloy is heated to a high temperature, and pounded while hot to form it. The blade is then heated above critical temperature (which varies between alloys), quenched in an appropriate liquid, and tempered to the desired hardness. Commercially, 'forged' blades may receive as little as one blow from a hammer between dies, to form features such as the 'bolster' in a blank. After forging and heat-treating, the blade is polished and sharpened. Forged blades are typically thicker and heavier than stamped blades, which is sometimes advantageous.
- Stamped blades are cut to shape directly from cold-rolled steel, heat-treated for strength, then ground, polished, and sharpened. Stamped blades can often, but not always, be identified by the absence of a bolster.

=== Type of edge ===
The edge of the knife can be sharpened to a cutting surface in a number of different ways. There are three main features:

- the grind — what a cross-section looks like
- the profile — whether the edge is straight or serrated, and straight, curved or recurved
- away from edge — how the blade is constructed away from the edge

==== Profile ====
Five typical tip shape styles found on kitchen knives and the associated region to which they are associated: round tip square tip triangular tip sheep's foot tip French point

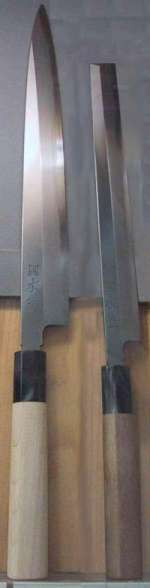
Japanese sashimi knives, displaying a pointed tip yanagi-ba bōchō and a Edo-style straight square-tip blade on a tako-hiki bōchō

Kitchen knives generally either feature a curve near the tip, as in a chef's knife, or are straight for their entire length. The edge itself may be generally smooth or 'straight' edge, or it may be serrated or scalloped with 'teeth'. Lastly, the point may differ in shape:

- the round point is usually found on long thin slicing knives, such ham and salmon slicers, as well as palette knives
- the square point is found on cleavers, along with knives of the Tokyo/Edo-style: usuba, nakiri, and takohiki sashimi bōchō
- the triangular point, most closely associated with German manufacture becoming the most common on Western knives as it is sharp, found on parers, utility, and chef's knives, as well as the Japanese knives deba bōchō and yanagiba sashimi bōchō
- the drop point − also called 'sheep's foot' − with the tip curving down to the blade edge being common in the Osaka-style of usuba, nakiri, and santoku knives
- the French point with the blade edge rising in an upwards curve and is characteristic of boning and steak knives from Thiers, Puy-de-Dôme and Laguiole, Aveyron in Occitania

==== Serrations ====
Serrated blade knives have a wavy, scalloped, or fine-toothed saw-like blade. Serrations help when cutting things that are firm on the outside and soft on the inside (such as bread or tomatoes); the saw-like action breaks the surface more easily than anything except the sharpest of smooth blades. They are also particularly good on fibrous foods such as celery or cabbage. Serrated knives cut much better than plain-edge blade knives when dull, so they do not require frequent sharpening, and are sometimes used to make steak knives which do not need frequent sharpening. However, they are not readily sharpened properly by a user, requiring specialized equipment, and may never be resharpened during their useful life. Serrations are often used to improve the cutting ability of a less-expensive blade not capable of taking and keeping a sharp edge, usually having a thin, polished blade designed to minimise friction. A serrated knife is more practical for a user who is not prepared to sharpen it frequently; a well-maintained and sharpened smooth edge is keener. Some companies have names for their own serration patterns and apply them to an entire line of knives. Examples are the Cutco Double-D edge and the Henckels Eversharp Pro series.

==== Indentations ====
Away from the edge, a knife most simply has either a rectangular or wedge-shaped cross-section (saber grind v. flat grind), but may also have indentations, whose purpose is to reduce adhesion of the food to the blade. This is widely found in Japanese knives, and in the West is particularly found in meat carving knives, though also in knives for soft cheese, and some use for vegetables.

These indentations take many forms:

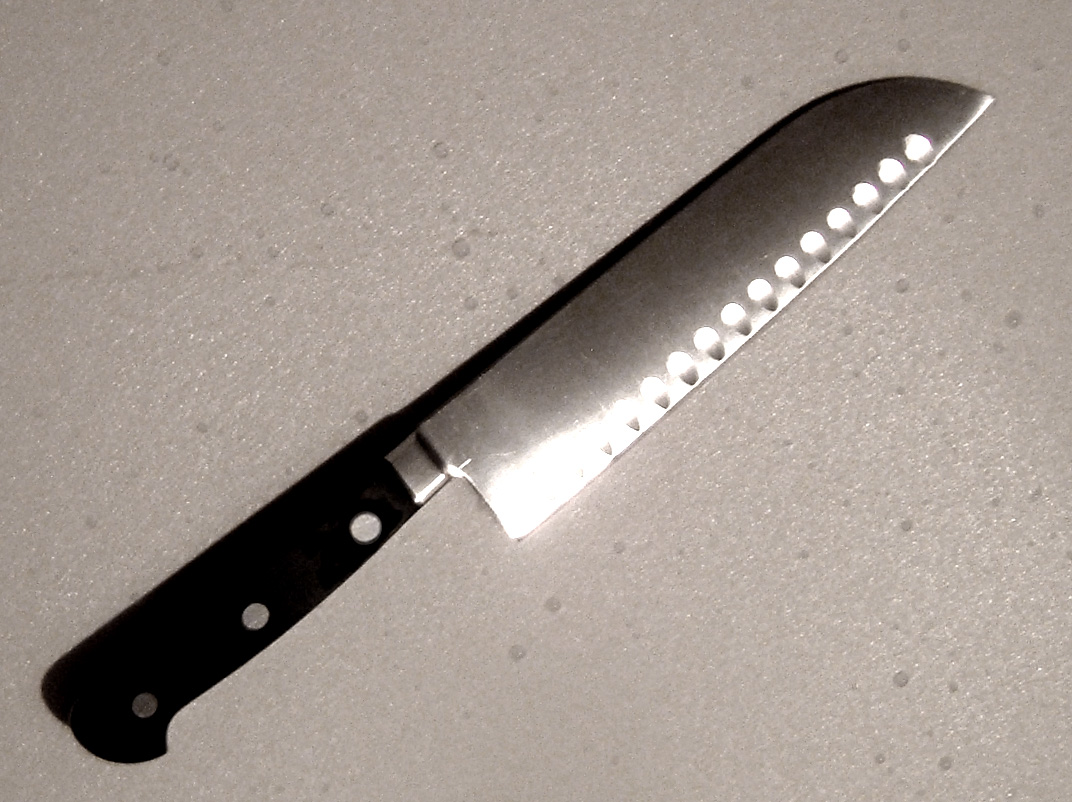
A Granton edge has air pockets along its side, as in this santoku-style knife.

- Granton knives have shallow curved fluted hollows or broad grooves ground into the edge that alternate on either side of the knife and extend from the edge towards the middle of the blade. This design was developed and patented in 1928 by William Grant & Sons Ltd. A similar design, kullenschliff (kulle is Swedish for hill; schliff meaning "cut" or grind in German), has oval fluting (kuhlen) hollowed-out of one or both sides of the blade above the edge. The Granton design is normally found on meat carving knives but have recently appeared on other types of knives, especially Western variations of the Japanese santoku. The indentations require a certain thickness, so they are more frequently used on thicker, softer blades, rather than on thin, hard ones. The design of flute-sided blades is an attempt to ease the cutting and separation of meats, cheese, and vegetables through reducing the adhesion, by allowing some air between the blade and the food.

- Urasuki is a common feature of Japanese kitchen knives. While Japanese kitchen knives initially appear as a simple chisel grind (flat on the side facing the food, angled on the other), the apparently flat side is subtly concave, to reduce adhesion, and, further, the apparent chisel cut of the edge is actually a small bevel, as otherwise the edge would be weakened by the concave area above.

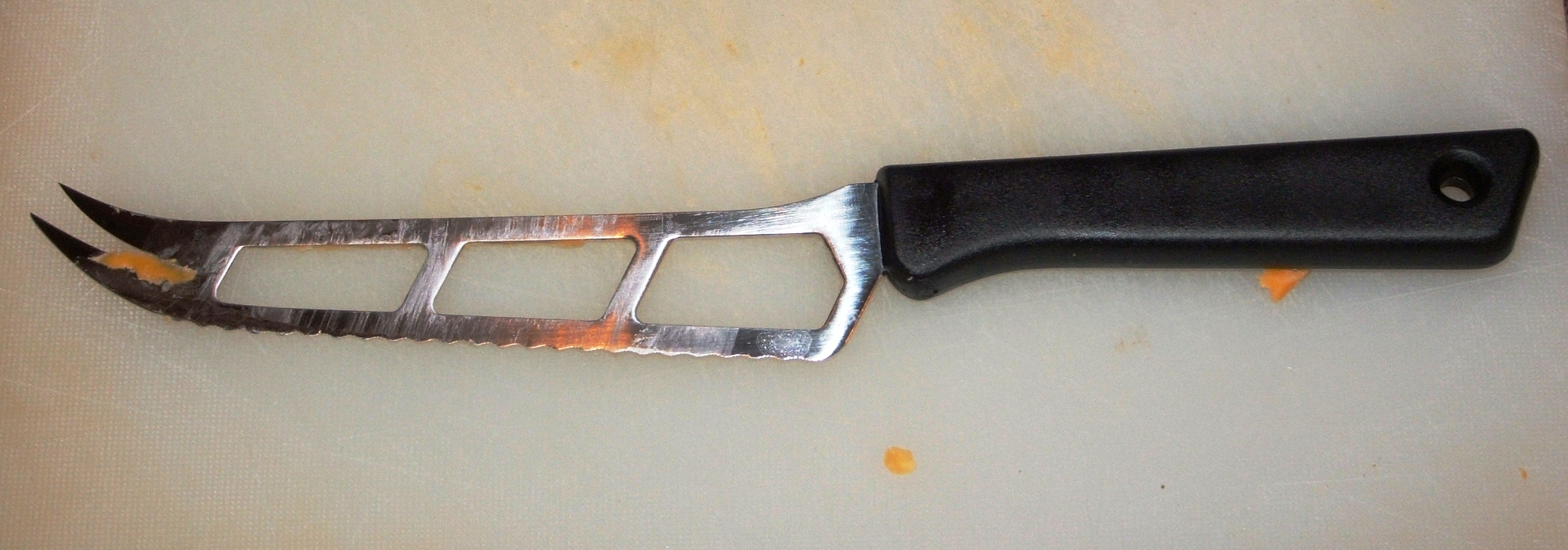
A knife for soft cheese, with holes to reduce adhesion.

- Holes may also be found in a blade, to reduce adhesion still further. These are most found in knives for soft cheese, which is particularly sticky.

==== Sharpening ====
The edge of a knife gradually loses its sharpness, which can be restored by sharpening. For many types of knives (e.g., butter knives) this is not relevant. Knives with smooth edges can be sharpened by the user; knives with any form of serrated edge should ideally be sharpened with specialist equipment, although the useful life of a serrated knife can be extended by simple sharpeners, even if they damage the edge.

=== Handle ===
The handles of kitchen knives can be made from a number of different materials, each of which has advantages and disadvantages.

- Wood handles provide good grip, and most people consider them to be the most attractive. They are, however, slightly more difficult to care for as they must be cleaned more thoroughly and occasionally treated with mineral oil. Most wood handles, especially those of ordinary varnished hardwood, do not resist water well, and will crack or warp with prolonged exposure to water. They should be hand-washed for that reason.
- Plastic handles are more easily cared for than wooden handles and do not hold microbes as well as wood. However, plastics may also be less resistant to ultraviolet damage and may become brittle over time, resulting in cracking. Some plastics are also slippery in the hand. The material is lighter than most other materials, which may result in a knife that is off-balance or too light for some tastes. With its high resistance to heat, silicone rubber-covered handles were introduced to reduce the problem of plastic handles accidentally burning or melting on hot surfaces and they also have the advantage of being not becoming slippery when wet.
- Composite, such as 'pakka wood', are made from laminated wood or other material composites impregnated with plastic resin. There is no need to oil as they are waterproof, so will not splinter or warp. Composite handles are considered by many chefs to be the best choice because they are as easy to care for and as sanitary as plastic, they have the appearance, weight, and grip of hardwood, and are more durable than either being both more resilient to heat and less slippery when wet. They often have a laminated, grained, polished appearance, and may have intense or varied hues.
- Stainless steel handles are the most durable of all handles, as well as the most sanitary. However, it can be considered slippery in the hand, especially when wet, so to counter this, manufacturers make handles with ridges, bumps, or indentations to provide extra grip. One disadvantage of some all-metal handles is that knife mass usually increases considerably, affecting the knife's balance and increasing hand and wrist fatigue. Knife manufacturers address this issue by producing hollow-handled knives.

The shapes of handles differ widely between Western and Oriental knives in their traditional forms, though with the merging of these styles, this has become less pronounced. Traditionally, Western knives are bilaterally flatted on the sides, to facilitate the riveting of the handle, and have a moulded form for comfort beneath. Often there is a lip at the butt of the handle, which gives the knife a better grip and prevents slipping. Whereas Oriental knives are circular, oval, or rounded octagonal, or even D-shaped in cross-section, usually with a slight taper towards the blade, but otherwise typically with little shaping or moulding to the blade.

== Nomenclature ==
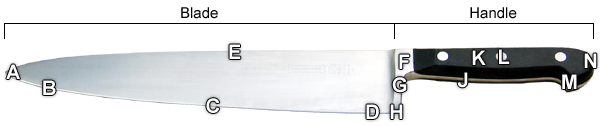

A	Point:	The very end of the knife, which is used for piercing
B	Tip:	The first third of the blade (approximately), which is used for small or delicate work. Also known as belly or curve when curved, as on a chef's knife.
C	Edge:	The entire cutting surface of the knife, which extends from the point to the heel. The edge may be beveled or symmetric.
D	Heel:	The rear part of the blade, used for cutting activities that require more force
E	Spine:	The top, thicker portion of the blade, which adds weight and strength
F	Bolster:	The thick metal portion joining the handle and the blade, which adds weight and balance
G	Finger guard:	The portion of the bolster that keeps the cook's hand from slipping onto the blade
H	Choil:	The point where the heel meets the bolster
J	Tang:	The portion of the metal blade that extends into the handle, giving the knife stability and extra weight
K	Scales:	The two portions of handle material (wood, plastic, composite, etc.) that are attached to either side of the tang
L	Rivets:	The metal pins (usually three) that hold the scales to the tang
M	Handle guard:	The lip below the butt of the handle, which gives the knife a better grip and prevents slipping
N	Butt:	The terminal end of the handle

== General kitchen knives ==
Different types of kitchen knives

=== Chef's knife ===
A chef's knife or cook's knife is also known as a French knife. Chef's knives are typically longer and wider bladed with a proper heel and choil, whereas shorter and narrower ones, sometimes without a proper heel and choil, tend to be known as cook's knives. It is an all-purpose medium to large-sized knife that is curved to allow the cook to rock the knife on the cutting board for a more precise cut. The broad and heavy blade also serves for chopping bone instead of the cleaver, making this knife an all-purpose heavy knife for food preparation. Chef's knives are most commonly available between 15 and 25 cm (6 and 10 in), with 20 cm (8 in) being the most common size.

=== Paring knife ===
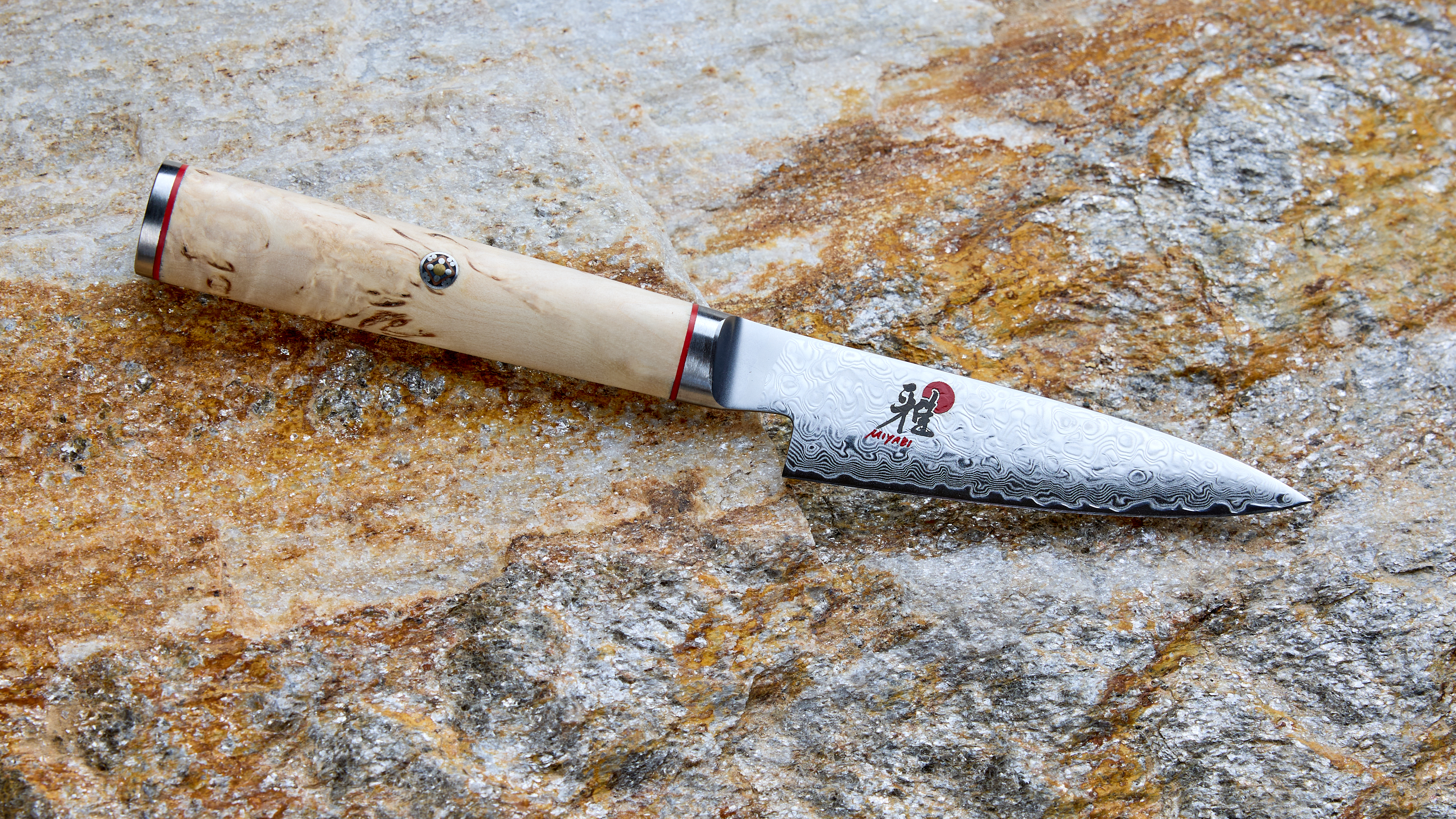
Japanese paring or petty knife with a 3.25-inch blade from the Miyabi Birchwood series

A parer, paring knife, or petty knife (Note: Petty being an English corruption of the French word petit meaning small.) is a small kitchen knife − usually with a plain edge, though sometimes serrated − that is ideal for peeling (or 'paring') fruit and vegetables, and other small or intricate work − such as removing the seeds from fruit and vegetables, like capsicums; 'skinning' or cutting small garnishes; and deveining shellfish, like prawns and lobsters. Paring knives have blades usually 6 to 10 cm (2 to 4 in) long and without a heel and choil, having the blade edge running straight to the handle. An alternative and safer way to peel vegetables and fruit is to use a peeler.

In book-binding, a paring knife − couteau à parer − is a tool used by 16th-century French book-binders to thin the edges of the leather binding being prepared to cover a book, in order to ensure it was neater and stuck better to the board. The knife was a large piece of steel, very thin at the cutting edge, with a wooden handle.

=== Utility kitchen knife ===
In kitchen usage, an all-purpose utility kitchen knife or universal kitchen knife, falls between a chef's/cook's knife and a paring knife in size, some 10 to 18 cm (4 to 7 in) in length and it is usually without a proper heel and choil, having the blade edge running straight to the handle.

Outside the kitchen, the term 'utility knife' refers to a different cutting tool − also called a craft knife − with a short blade which can be readily replaced, or with a strip of blades which can be snapped off when worn.

== Meat knives ==
=== Carving ===
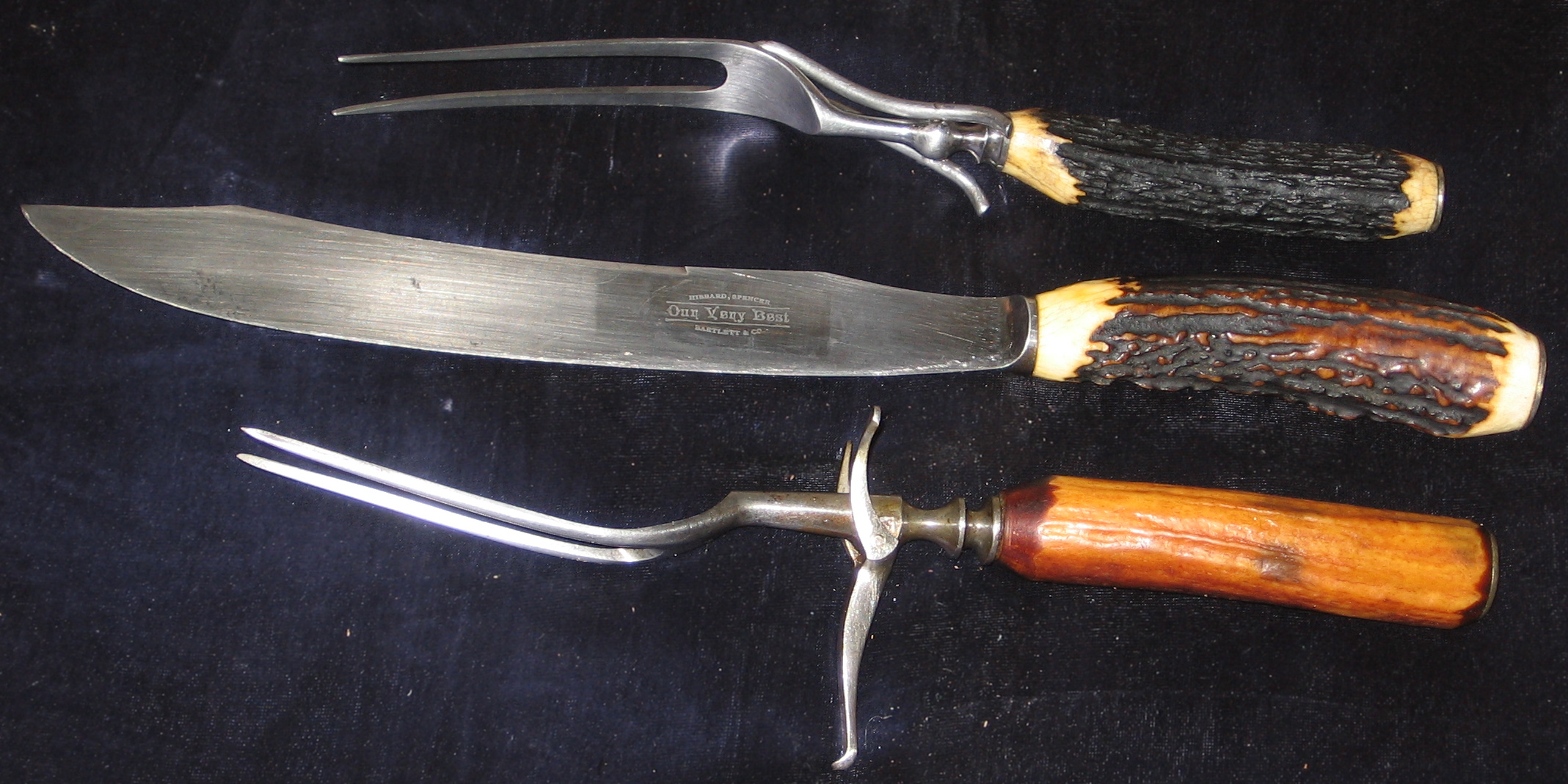
Old carving knife (middle) and carving forks, non-stainless steel. Stag handles. Note folding fork guards.

A carving knife is a large knife, between 20 cm (8 in) and 38 cm (15 in), that is used to slice thin cuts of meat, including poultry, roasts, hams, and other large cooked meats. A carving knife is much thinner than a chef's knife (particularly at the spine), enabling it to carve thinner, more precise slices.

=== Slicing ===
A slicing knife serves a similar function to a carving knife, although it is generally longer and narrower. Slicers may have plain or serrated edges. Such knives often incorporate blunted or rounded tips, and feature kullenschliff (Swedish/German: 'hill-sharpened') or Granton edge (scalloped blades) to improve meat separation. Slicers are designed to precisely cut smaller and thinner slices of meat, and are normally more flexible to accomplish this task. As such, many cooks find them better suited to slicing ham, roasts, fish, or barbecued beef, pork, and venison. Another use can be for bigger fruit, like watermelon or cantaloupe.

==== Ham slicer ====
A ham slicer is a type of knife specially tailored to slicing slivers of cooked ham − along with large smoked fish, such as salmon and trout − having a thinner and more flexible long blade with usually a rounded tip. The average size of the knife is between 22 cm (9 in) and 38 cm (15 in).

=== Cleaver ===
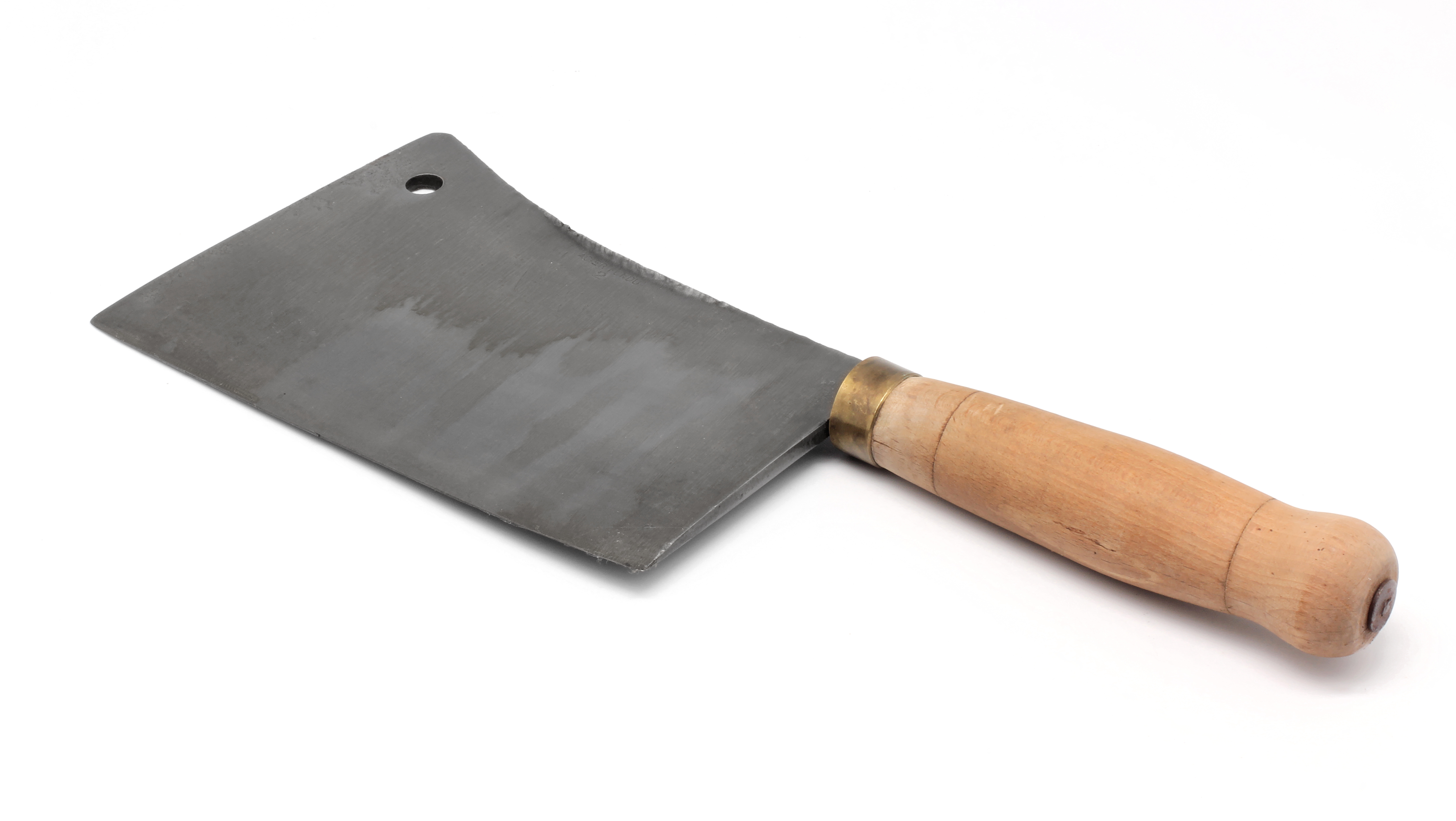
A modern wood-handled cleaver

A meat cleaver is a large, most often rectangular knife that is used for splitting or "cleaving" meat and bone. A cleaver may be distinguished from a kitchen knife of similar shape by the fact that it has a heavy blade that is thick from the spine to quite near the edge. The edge is sharply bevelled and the bevel is typically convex. The knife is designed to cut with a swift stroke without cracking, splintering or bending the blade. Many cleavers have a hole in the end to allow them to be easily hung on a rack. Cleavers are an essential tool for any restaurant that prepares its own meat. The cleaver most often found in a home knife set is a light-duty cleaver about 15 cm (6 in) long. Heavy cleavers with much thicker blades are often found in the trade.

A 'lobster splitter' is a light-duty cleaver used mainly for shellfish and fowl which has the profile of a chef's knife.

The Chinese chef's knife is sometimes called a 'Chinese cleaver', due to the rectangular blade, but it is unsuitable for cleaving, its thin blade instead designed for slicing; actual Chinese cleavers are heavier and similar to Western cleavers.

A cleaver is most popularly known as butcher knife which is the commonly used by chefs for cutting big slices of meat and poultry.

=== Boning ===
A boning knife is used to remove bones from cuts of meat. It has a thin, flexible blade, usually about 12 to 15 cm (5 to 6 in) long, that allows it to get in to small spaces. A stiff boning knife is good for beef and pork, and a flexible one is preferred for poultry and fish.

=== Fillet ===
Fillet knives are similar to boning knives (though Fillet knives are much more flexible) that are used to fillet and prepare fish. They have blades about 15 cm (6 in) and 30 cm (12 in) long, allowing them to move easily along the backbone and under the skin of fish.

=== Steak knife ===
A steak knife is a sharp table knife used to cut steak that comes in different styles and sizes. The form most often found in steakhouses usually has a partially serrated blade and a wooden handle. The serrations aid cutting through the flesh of the larger and thicker sliced steaks and allow for a less keenly honed blade to cut connective tissue. However, this should not be needed with a well sharpened knife and if the kitchen serves higher quality, tender steaks − such as fillet or sirloin − cooked to reflect this quality. A good smooth-edged knife should slice easily through a good steak, even if served very rare as in a blue steak. Tougher steaks with much more connective tissue should not be served rare, flash fried or grilled, as there is not enough heat or time to break down these tough fibres. These lower quality steaks should be trimmed in the kitchen to thinner and smaller pieces − even marinated for some time − and then a slower & more gentle form of cooking is needed to give the opportunity for the connective tissue to render down to tenderness. Such cooking as this does not allow for these to be served rare and ruddy pink.

== Cheese knives ==
Cheese is varied and often challenging to cut. Accordingly, various styles of cheese knives and cheese-cutting utensils have been developed.

A wire cheese cutter, rather than a knife, is often used to cut firm cheese, from some semi-soft to semi-hard forms.

=== Soft cheese ===
Cheese knives for cutting very soft cheese − like a fresh whey / cottage cheese and ricotta, or a fully ripened brie and camembert − are typically short and broad with an exaggerated rounded tip − somewhat similar to a palette or butter knife but sharper. This is to help cutting through the rind and then to pick up and spread or 'spoon' the runny cheese on bread or a cracker.

=== Semi-soft cheese ===
Semi-soft cheese knives are specially designed for slicing softer and fresher firm cheese, such as Port Salut. They generally have a curved blade with holes in it to prevent the cheese from sticking.

=== Medium-hard cheese ===
Medium-hard cheese knives − for ones like Edam and Emmental − are a halfway-house between the semi-soft knives and those for semi-hard. Typically, the blade is straight and serrated, with a forked tip and holes to prevent the cheese from sticking.

=== Semi-hard cheese ===
Semi-hard cheese knives are specially designed for slicing harder and more mature firm cheese, such as Cheddar or Wensleydale. They have sharp straight-edged blades, so they can cut exact slices. Often these blades are thin, narrow, and off-set, with finely serrated edge, to avoid crumbling as the cheese is sliced, and with a forked tip, allowing them to be used as a serving utensil, as well.

Cheese slicers are also used to give slices of more consistent thickness, but they require greater manual handling of the cheese itself, so are less frequently used at the table − on the grounds of hygiene − and more for preparation.

=== Hard or grana cheese ===
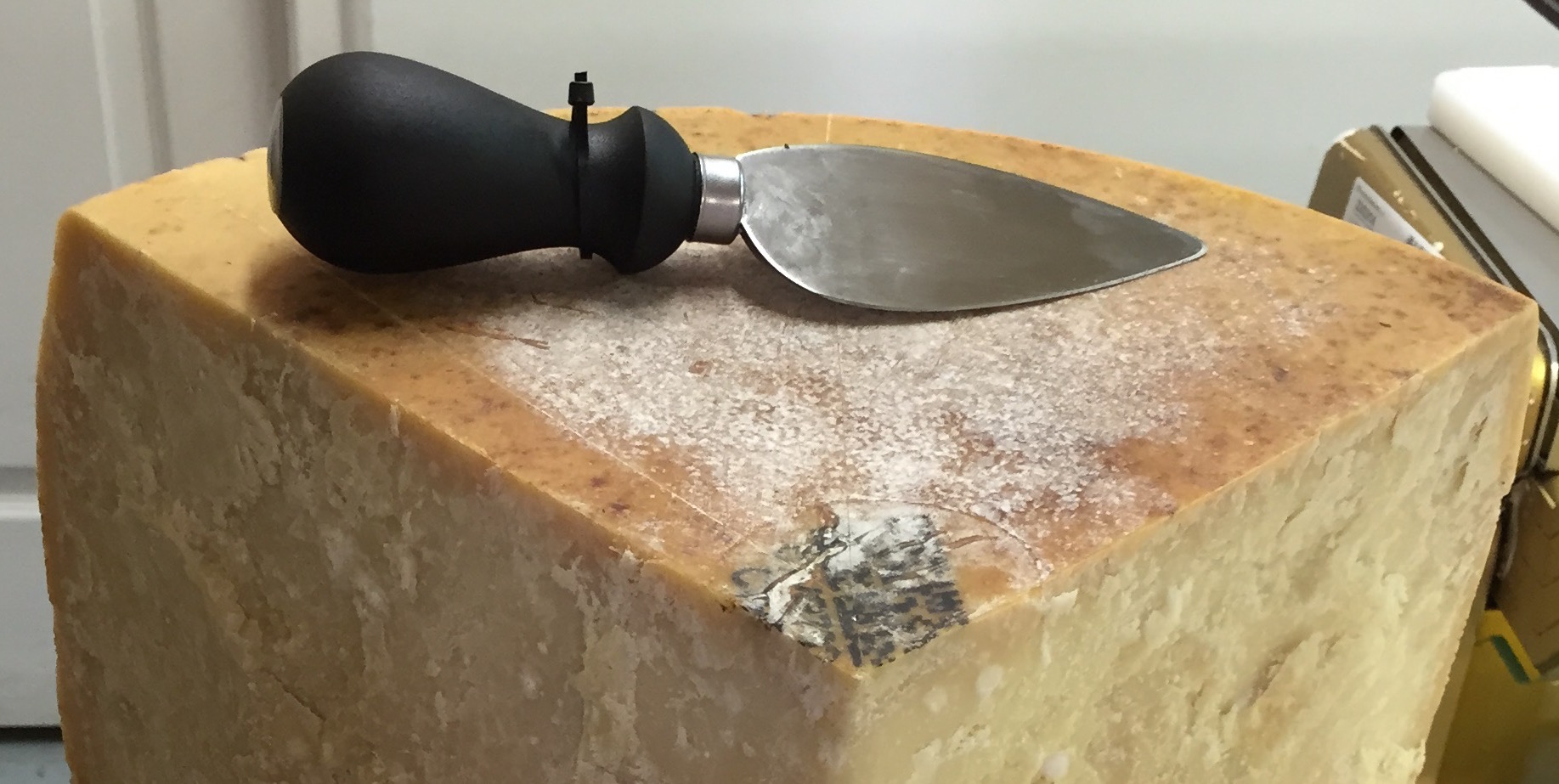
A Parmesan knife, featuring a short, stubby blade.

Parmesan cheese knives are specially designed for cleaving hard, crystallised granular cheese. They have very short, thick, curved teardrop-shaped with pointed stabbing tip blades, which are forced into the more crystalline form of cheese. These are then used to chisel or as a lever to fracture and break off smaller fragments, through the natural fracture lines within the block, and so revealing its natural texture and crumb.

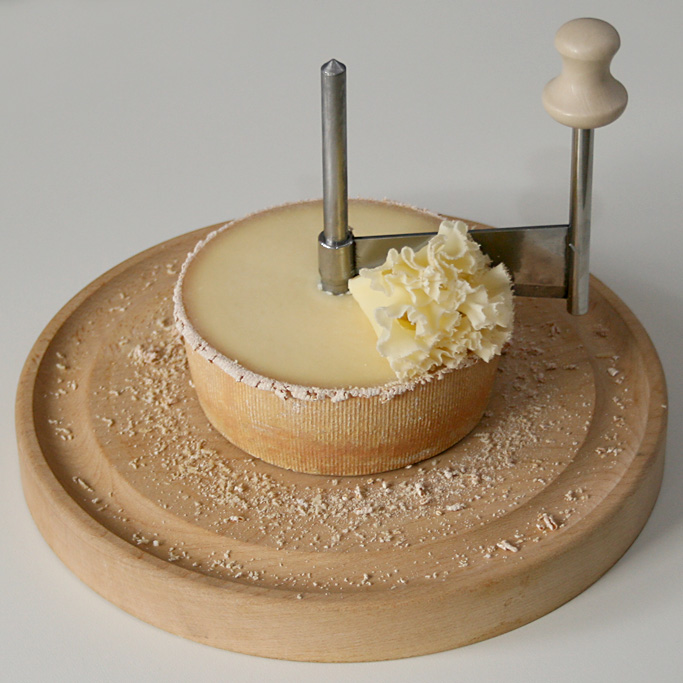
Tête de Moine AOP with girolle

Slicing hard cheese is considered improper by connoisseurs − along with being hard work − since the cheese, when broken apart, has more surface area, and thus more air contact, which strengthens the apparent scent and taste of the cheese.

A girolle − a blade mounted on an axle to pivot over a wooden board − is used to shave cheese to produce wafer-thin curls. Hard cheese can also be shaved using an ordinary kitchen utility or cook's knife, to produce these wafer-thin curls, usually used for garnishing a dish.

== Small knives ==
=== Peeling or tourné knife ===
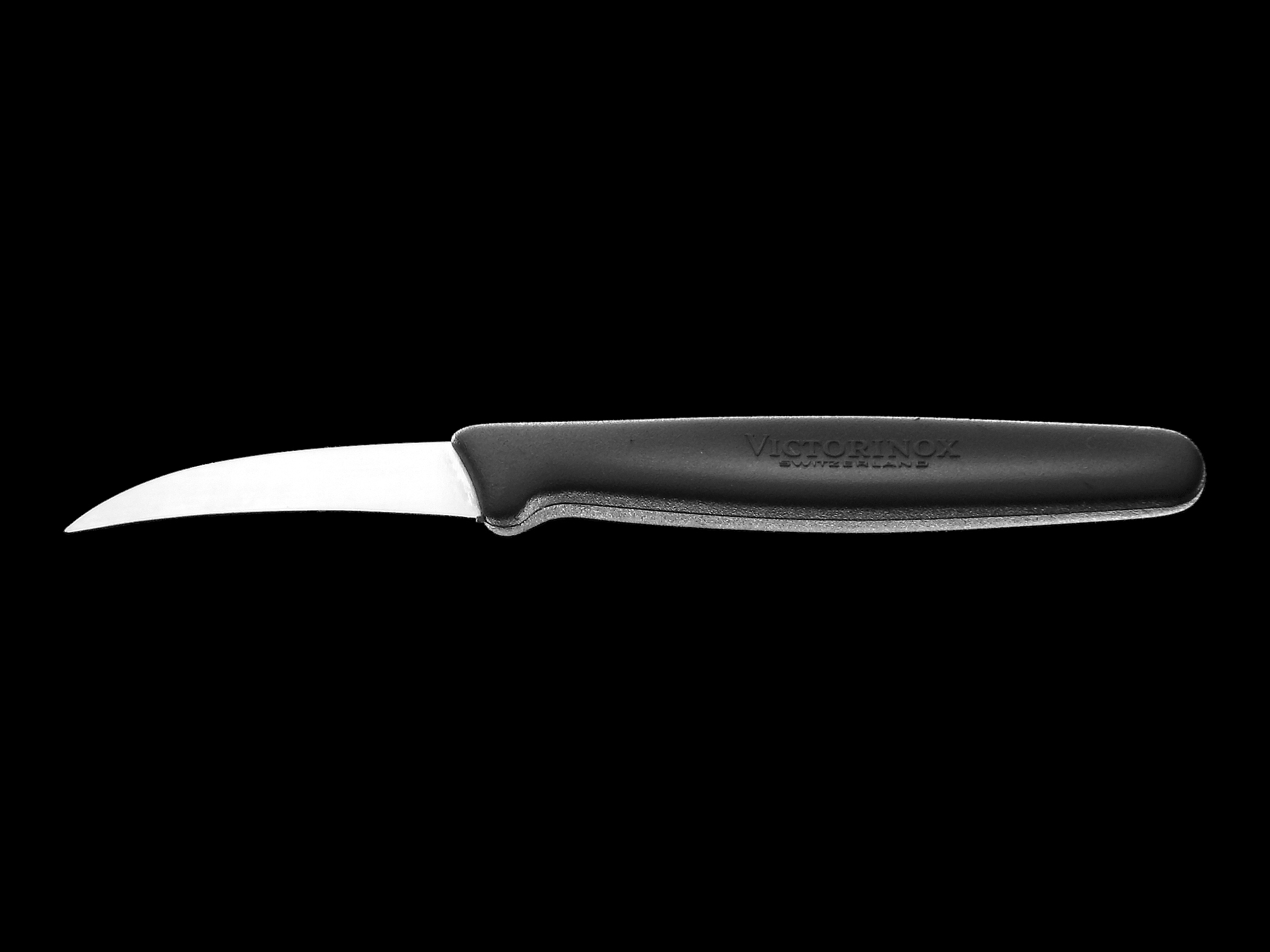
A tourné knife

A peeling or tourné or a bird's beak knife has a pointed tip that curves downward (sometimes upward) and from side to side (towards the blade), usually about 6 to 12 cm (2 to 5 in) long. It can be used to cut decorative garnishes (such as rosettes or fluted mushrooms), slice soft fruits, or to remove skins and blemishes. It is also used to make a cut known as a tourné cut in vegetables such as carrots. It is a specialized type of paring knife.

=== Trimming ===
A trimming knife has a small, curved blade, usually about 5 to 8 cm (2 to 3 in) long, that is shaped somewhat like a boning knife. Trimming knives are ideal for small tasks such as decorating and peeling.

=== Decorating or fluting ===
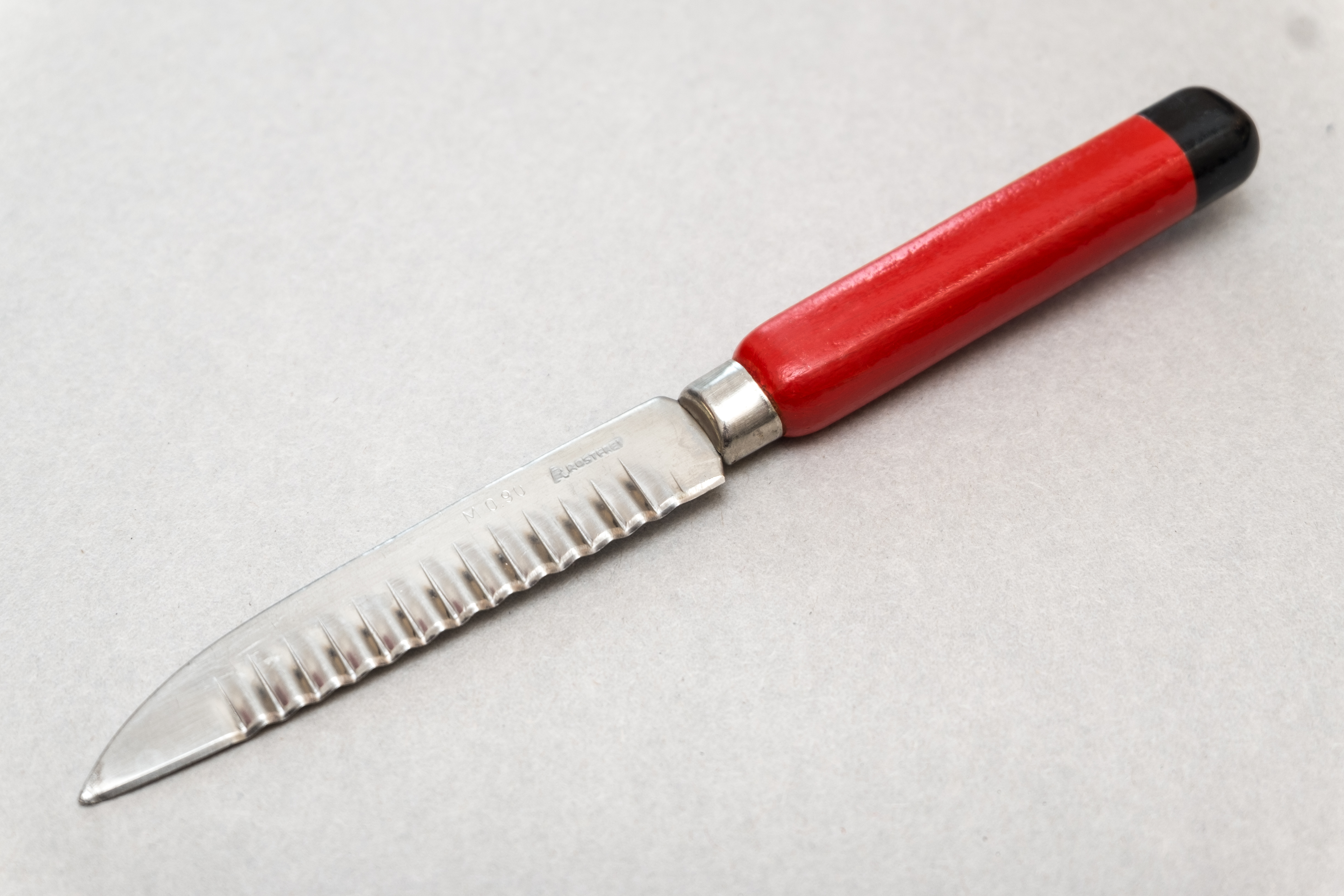
Knife with blade designed to make decorative cuts

A decorating knife is any knife with a blade designed to make a decorative cut. The most common pattern is a simple zigzag or fluting. Decorating knives are ideal for use in making fancy cuts for garnishes, presentation, and other small tasks (such as rosettes or fluted mushrooms). Usually a small blade about 5 to 10 cm (2 to 4 in) long.

== Speciality knives ==
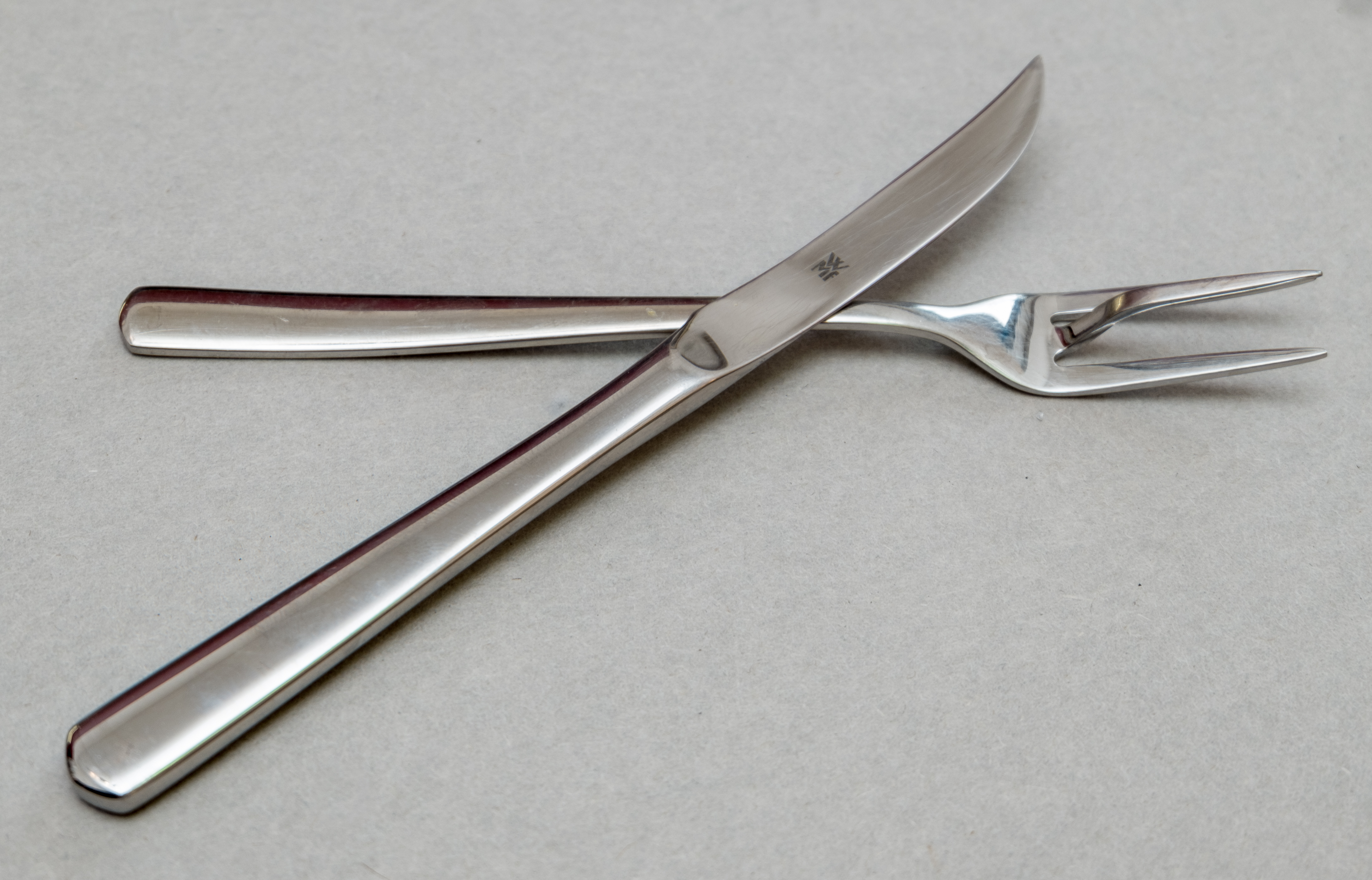
Special cutlery to remove potato skins

Certain knives are specialized for a particular food. For example, oyster knives are necessary to shuck oysters (which cannot be opened safely otherwise), but are not used outside of shellfish.

=== Bread knife ===
Bread knives are usually between 20 to 30 cm (8 to 12 in) with scalloped- or serrated-edge blades, which are able to cut through the firm crust and soft bread without crushing it.

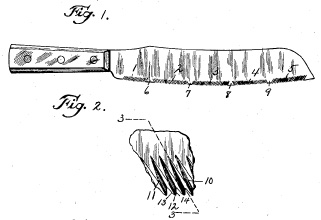
Burns patent bread knife

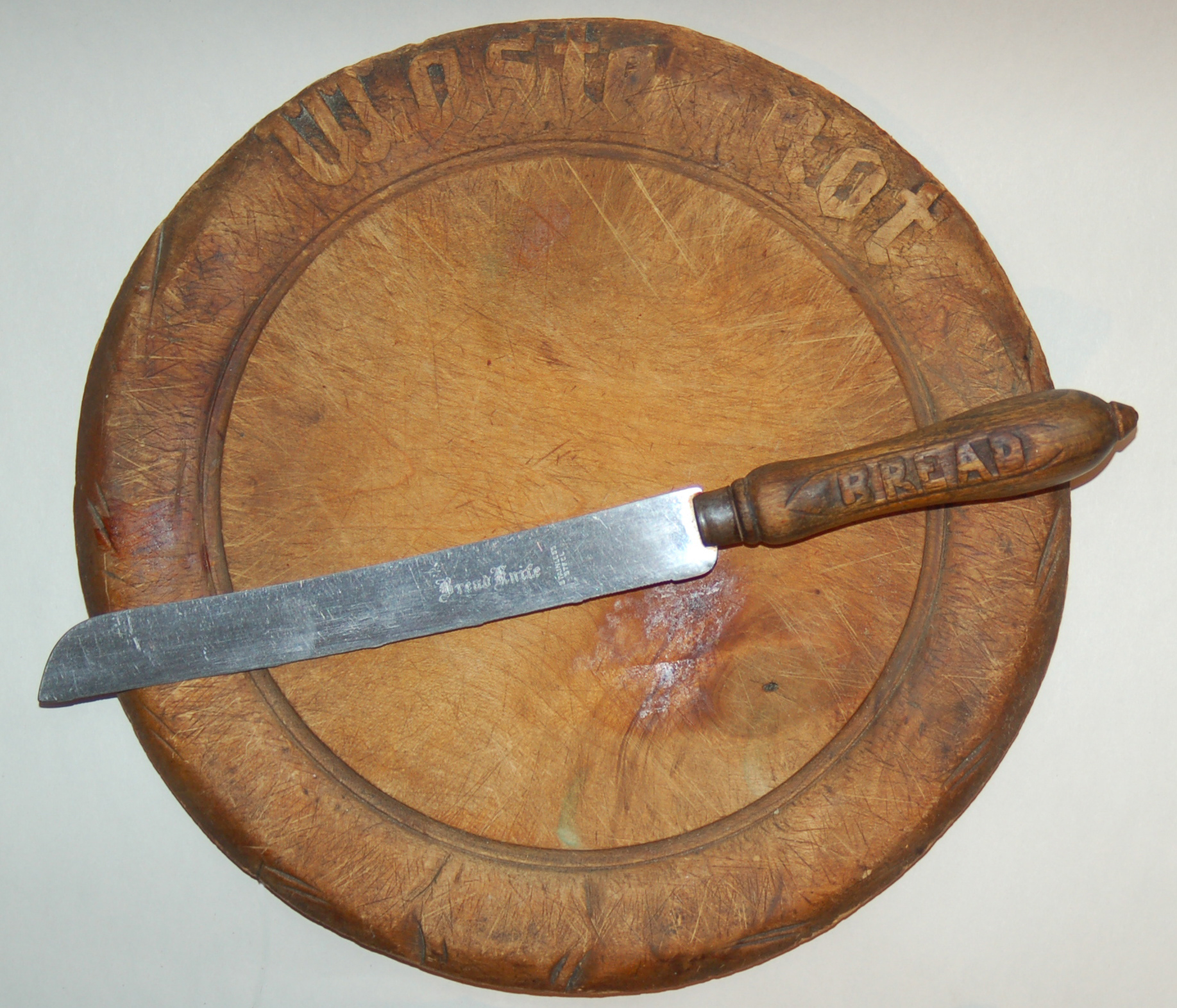
19th-century cutting board with a bread knife

In 1893, one was exhibited at the World's Columbian Exposition in Chicago by the Friedrich Dick company of Esslingen, Germany. One design was patented in the United States by Joseph E. Burns of Syracuse, New York. His knife had sections of grooves or serrations, inclined with respect to the axis of the blade, that form individual small cutting edges which were perpendicular to the blade and thus cut without the excessive normal pressure required of a scalloped blade and without the horizontal force required by positive-raked teeth that would dig into the bread like a wood saw. There were also sections of grooves with the opposite direction of inclination, separated by a section of smooth blade, and the knife thus cut cleanly in both directions in both firm and soft bread.

An offset bread knife 'doglegs' the handle above, but parallel to the blade − rather than in-line with it, although some are angled − providing clearance for the user's knuckles. This design makes it easier for the user to cut fully through the loaf without using an awkward grip, angling and 'see-sawing' the blade, or needing to position the knife handle over the edge of the counter or cutting board. While fairly specialized and unnecessary for most kitchens (and breads), the offset design is well-suited for high-volume/'production' work where much bread − particularly e.g. crusty loaves of baguette-type bread − is cut regularly and/or over long periods, to reduce fatigue. An alternative seen mostly in Europe is a baguette 'chopper' or 'guillotine' − not properly a knife, and prone to produce more of a 'crushing' cut depending on the bread − but serving the same function.

=== Butter knife ===
A butter knife is small and stiff-bladed with a broad round tip and have a dull cutting edge. They are typically thought of more as serving-ware (used more as part of a table setting), to be used by diners to serve and/or spread butter or other soft spreadable foods, i.e. soft cheeses or jams, than as a kitchen or food preparation tool.

A modern variant that is intended for food preparation is the 'sandwich spreader' or palette knife, having a broad, flexible, almost spatula-like tool, with a rounded end and sometimes one serrated edge, similar to that used by pastry chefs to ice cakes. This is useful for spreading butter, mayonnaise, and other similar 'spreads' or dressings − pâté, ham spread, sandwich 'salad' toppings like egg salad, chicken salad, etc. − on bread.

=== Palette ===
A palette knife has a long, wide, and flexible thin blade with a rounded tip and is used for spreading pastes and semi-liquid food − e.g. icing over a cake.

=== Chestnut ===
A chestnut knife is used to score through the thin shell a chestnut with an cross prior to roasting, so that steam does not build up inside and cause the nut to explode. They have very shallow blades so that they can cut through the case without cutting through the nut inside.

=== Deveiner ===
A deveiner or deveining knife is a small knife used to remove the sometimes gritty, dark gut ('vein') from the cooked and shelled bodies of crustacean shellfish including shrimps, prawns, and lobsters.

=== Oyster ===
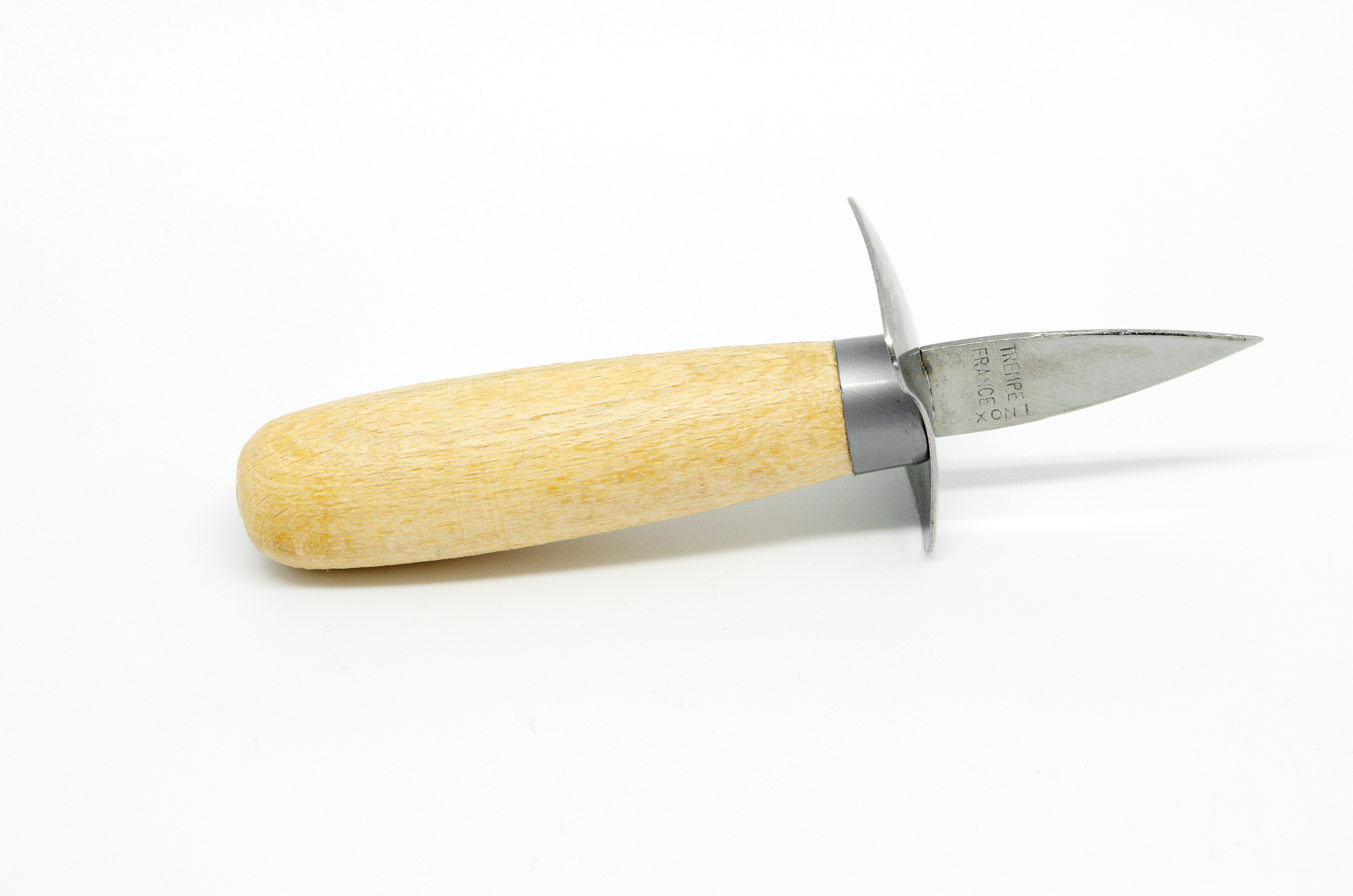
Oyster knife

An oyster knife has a short, thick blade that is used to pry open oysters and separate their meat from the shell (shucking). Some models have a shield built into the handle that prevents the knife (and hand) from slipping and going too far into the shell. The handle is normally thick and short, with a bulbous end.

The blade is about 5 to 7 cm (2 to 3 in) long and comes in either two styles, straight and club-shaped. Styles with a straight blade may have oblong guards and include:

- French: This has a straight, thin blade suited to Ostrea edulis, a common oyster in France.
- Providence: This type is long and narrow.
- New Haven: The blade is fairly wide and blunt. The tip is angled upward.

The club-shaped style has a diamond-shaped blade with the width of about 4 cm (1.6 in) at the "shoulders" and 1.3 cm (0.5 in) at the handle, occasionally with a serration on one edge or a notch to break off an edge of the shell. The head of the blade has a sharp tip. Guards, if any, are round.

=== Grapefruit ===
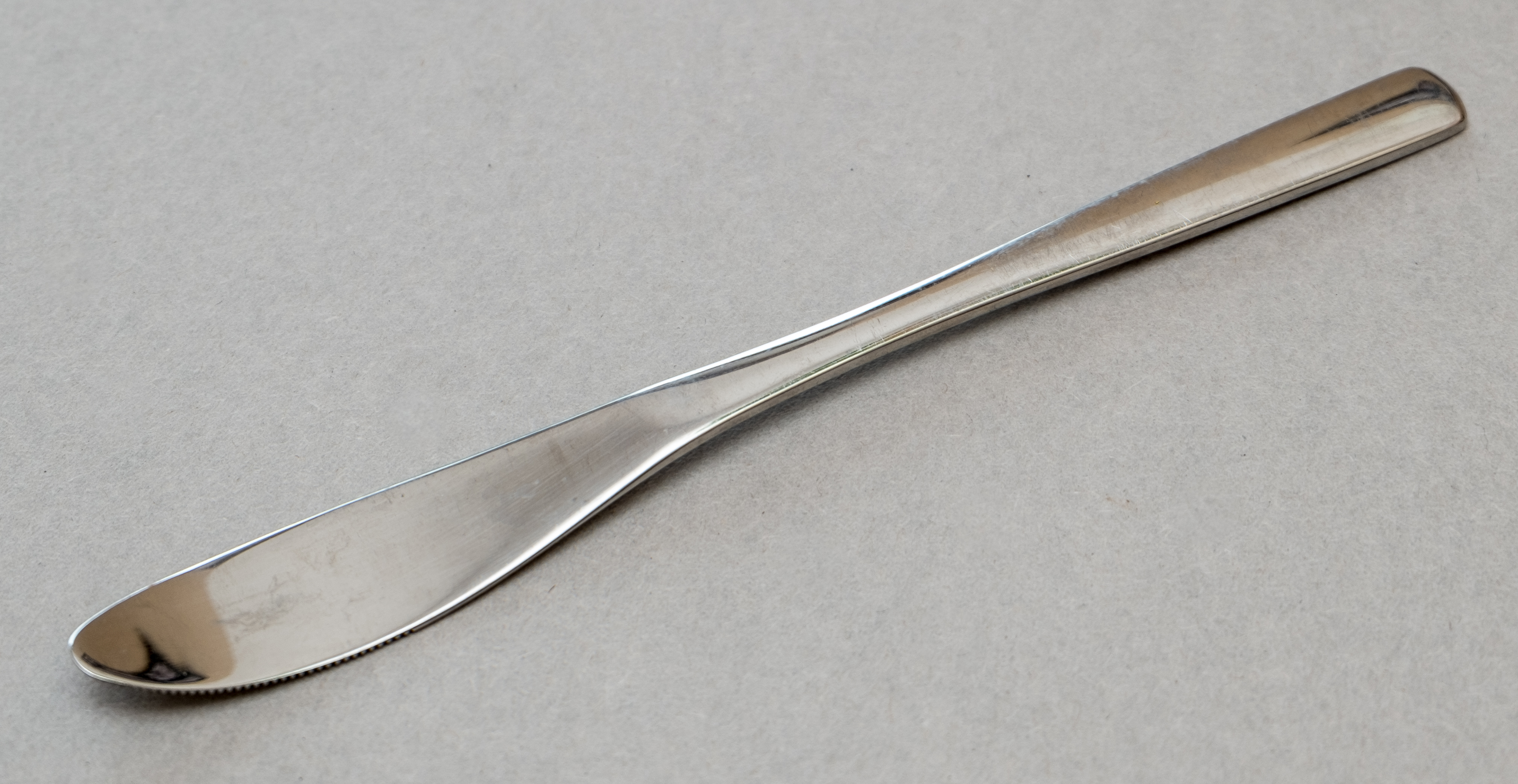
Grapefruit knife

A grapefruit knife has a long, fat, dull blade that is used to separate the flesh of a grapefruit from the peel and inner membranes. The blade is usually serrated, with a blunt tip. Some knives even have a different blade style on each end of the handle – one for the inner membrane, one for the peel – and some have a double blade at the inner membrane end, to cut on both sides of the membrane.

=== Tomato ===
A tomato knife is a small knife with a serrated blade. Typically about the size of a utility knife, tomato knives are ideal for cutting through the tough skin and soft flesh of tomatoes.

== Other knives ==
=== Mincing ===
Also known as a mezzaluna (Italian: "half moon") or hachoir (French: 'chopper') because of the shape, a chopping and mincing knife is a semi-circular highly curved blade, with either one or two handles, that allows the blade to be rocked back and forth repeatedly on the cutting board. This rocking motion is ideal for mincing and chopping. Some mincing knives are supplied with a wooden cutting board with a circular bowl-shaped indentation that matches the curvature of the knife. Some models have two blades that are parallel to each other to increase their mincing power.

A large mezzaluna-like knife − usually 30 and 45 cm (12 and 18 in) long − with a shallow curve are sometimes used to cut pizza in commercial premises, though the circular rolling pizza cutter is more common at home for this purpose.

== By country ==
=== Japanese knives ===
Traditionally, Japan has the predominant style kitchen knives with just a single bevelled edge − a form known as kataba used for Shobu-bōchō (for slicing sashimi), deba bōchō, and usuba bōchō − with the highest quality blades having a slight depression − urasuki − on the flat side. These three knives form the essentials of a basic Japanese kitchen knife set. The kataba gives better cuts and allows for the cutting of thinner slices than the double bevel ryōba edged blades − used for more modern, Western-influenced santoku bōchō, nakiri bōchō, and gyūtō bōchō chef's knife − but requires more skill to use. The sharpened side is usually the right side for a right-hand use of the knife, but knives sharpened on the left side are available for left-hand use.

==== Shobu-bōchō ====
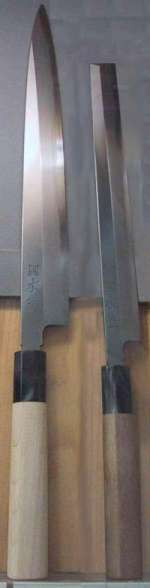
Yanagiba (left) and Takohiki (right)

The yanagi-ba is the commonest variant of the sashimi knife, and along with tako-hiki, and fugu-hiki are long thin knives used in the Japanese kitchen, belonging to the group of shobu or sashimi bōchō to prepare sliced raw fish and seafood.

Similar to the nakiri bocho, the style differs slightly between Tokyo and Osaka. In Osaka, the yanagi-ba has a pointed end, whereas Edo-style the tako-hiki from Tokyo has a rectangular end. The tako-hiki is usually used to prepare octopus. A fugu-hiki is similar to the yanagi-ba, except that the blade is thinner and, as the name indicates, is traditionally used to slice very thin fugu pufferfish sashimi.

The length of the knife is suitable to fillet medium-sized fish. For very large fish such as tuna, longer specialized knives exist, for example the almost two-metre long maguro bōchō, or the slightly shorter hancho hocho.

==== Deba bōchō ====

The Deba knife is used primarily for preparing fish. They have wide blades and are the thickest of all Japanese kitchen knives and come in different sizes − sometimes up to 30 centimetres (12 inches) in length and 10 millimetres (0.4 inches) thick − but are usually considerably shorter, normally between 12 and 20 cm (5 and 8 in) long with a blade between 5 and 7 mm (0.2 and 0.3 in) thick. The larger form of knife is called an hon-deba, ('true deba') whereas the smaller form is a ko-deba. The deba bōchō first appeared during the Edo period in Sakai. Following the traditions of Japanese knives, they have just a single bevel, kataba, to the edge of the blade − with an urasuki hollow back on premium blades.

==== Usuba bōchō ====

Usuba bocho is a vegetable knife used by professionals. The usuba bocho is sharpened only from one side, a style known as kataba in Japanese and the highest quality kataba blades even have a slight depression on the flat side. This kataba style edge gives better cuts and allows for the cutting of thinner slices than the ryoba used for nakiri bocho, but requires more skill to use. The sharpened side is usually the right side for a right hand use of the knife, but knives sharpened on the left side are also available for left hand use. The usuba-bocho is also slightly heavier than a nakiri bocho, although still much lighter than a deba bocho.

==== Nakiri bōchō ====
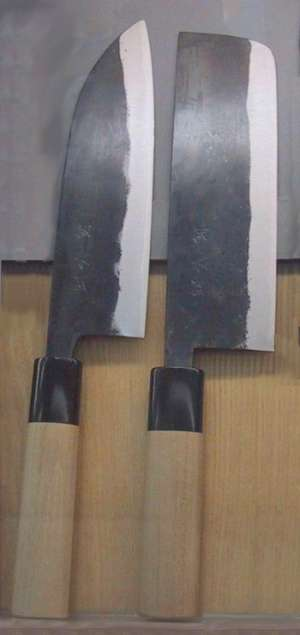
Nakiri bōchō with an Osaka-style blade (left) and Tokyo-style blade (right)

Nakiri bocho is a Japanese-style vegetable knife and a variant of the Usuba. They differ from the Usuba bocho in the shape of the cutting edge. While the nakiri bocho is sharpened from both sides, the usuba bocho is sharpened only from one side. They differ from the deba bocho in their shape, as they have a straight blade edge suitable for cutting all the way to the cutting board without the need for a horizontal pull or push. These knives are also much thinner. While the deba bocho is a heavy blade for easy cutting through thin bones, the blade is not suitable for chopping vegetables, as the thicker blade can break the vegetable slice. The nakiri bocho and the usuba bocho have much thinner blades, and are used for cutting vegetables.

They are knives for home use, and usually have a black blade. The shape of the nakiri bocho differs according to the region of origin, with knives in the Tokyo area being rectangular in shape, whereas the knives in the Osaka area have a rounded corner on the far blunt side. The cutting edge is angled from both sides, called ryoba in Japanese. This makes it easier to cut straight slices.

==== Santoku ====
The Santoku is a generalist utility knife has a straighter edge than a chef's knife, with a rounded sheep's foot-tip blade and a thinner spine, particularly near the point. A more modern 20th century style of knife, developed in the 1940s, with its name meaning 'three virtues', reflecting the combination the best traits of three other knives: the deba, nakiri, and gyūtō bōchō (the Japanese chef's knife for preparing meat). From 12 to 18 cm (5 to 7 in) long, a Japanese santoku is well-balanced, normally flat-ground, and generally smaller, lighter, and thinner than its Western counterparts. This construction allows the knife to more easily slice thin-boned and boneless meats, fish, and vegetables. Many subsequent Western and Asian copies of the Japanese santoku do not always incorporate these features, that can result in reduced refinement of these qualities. Some Western santoku-pattern knives are even forge-stamped with flutings on the sides of the blade above the edge, in an attempt reduce cutting friction and the adhesion of foods to the blade. As a standard in Asian (especially Japanese) kitchens, the santoku and its Western-style variants have become very popular in recent years with chefs in Europe and North America.

=== Chinese chef's knife ===
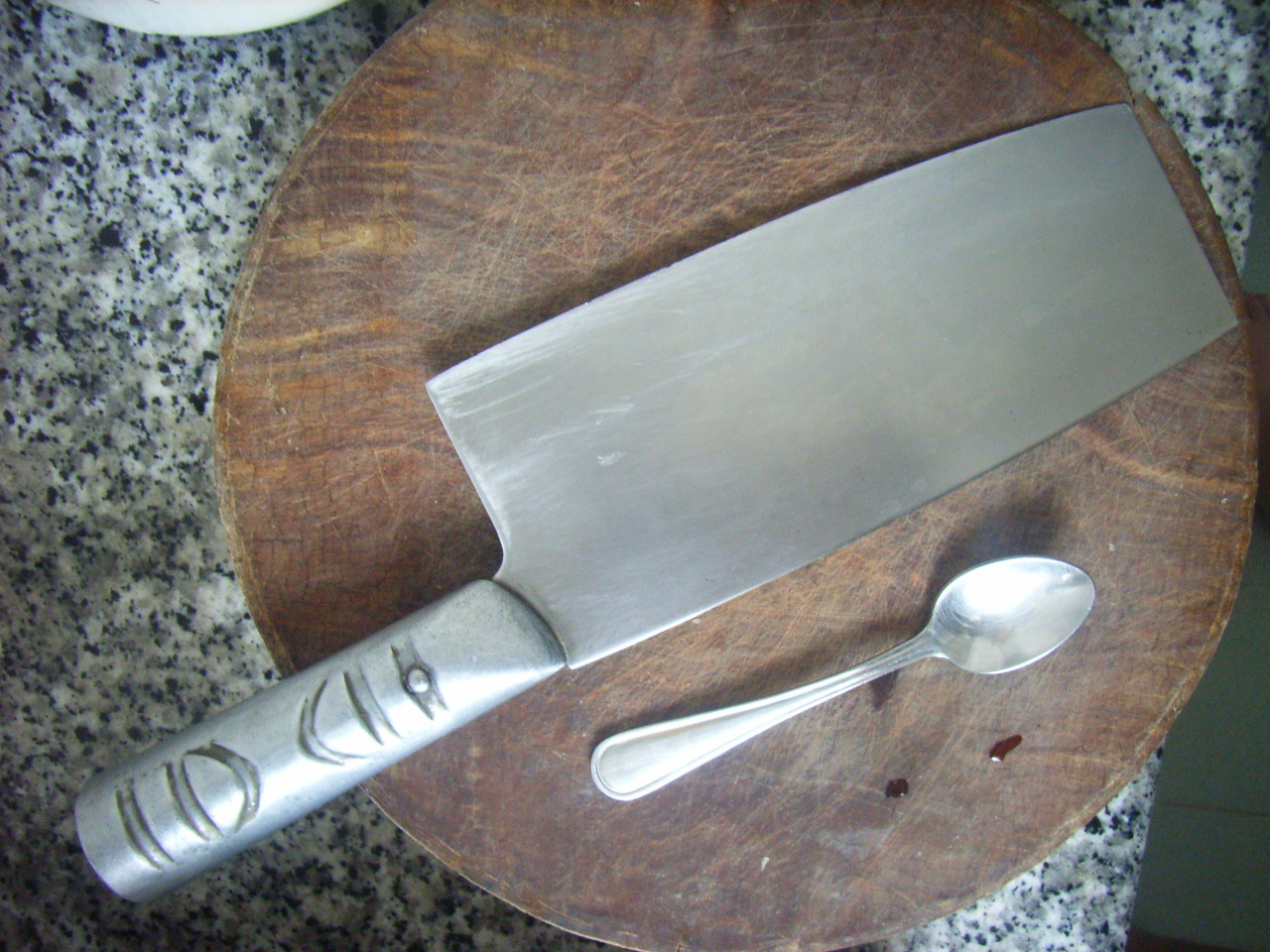
A càidāo next to a spoon

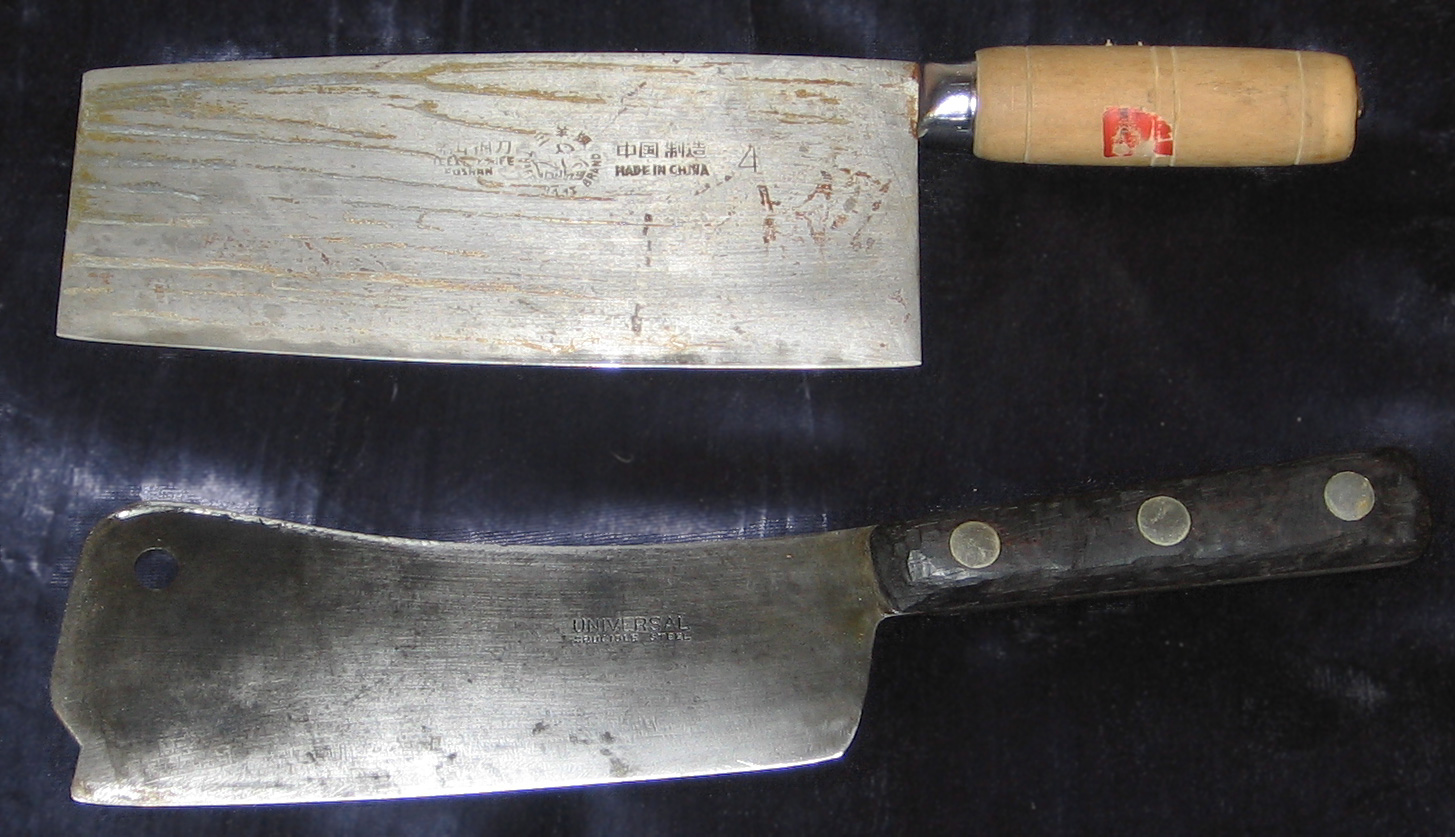
A càidāo (top) compared to an old North American cleaver (bottom)

A Chinese chef's knife − sometimes referred to as a càidāo (Chinese: 菜刀, lit. 'vegetable knife'), a Chinese cleaver or a 'chopper', is the rectangular-bladed, all-purpose cooking knife traditionally used in China, Vietnam, Cambodia and many other Asian countries to prepare a variety of meats, fish and vegetables. The popularity of this style of knife has spread with the associated cuisines. They resemble Western cleavers in appearance, but most Chinese chef's knives are relatively thin-bladed and designed for slicing, finely chopping and mincing vegetables, fish and boneless meats. The heavier gǔdāo (Chinese: 骨刀, lit. 'bone knife') are produced and are used much like Western-type meat cleavers to prepare large sides of beef, pork and other boned meats. However, Chinese-style knives of this weight are not common in the West.

Caidao or so-called 'Chinese cleaver' is not a cleaver, and most manufacturers warn that it should not be used as a cleaver. It is more properly referred to as a Chinese chef's knife and is actually a general-purpose knife, analogous to the French chef's knife or the Japanese santoku. The confusion arises from the fact that Chinese chef's knives are rectangular and that some (particularly older, traditional knives made of carbon steel) have somewhat heavy blades. Also, the fact that the blade is heavier toward the tip encourages skilled Chinese chefs to use a swinging or 'tapping' stroke as well as a 'pushing' stroke. However, the edge has the gradual bevel of a chef's knife and will most probably be damaged if used for splitting bone. Actual cleavers in China have the same profile as chef's knives but have much thicker blades with a sharp bevel and heavier handles.

Modern Chinese knives are sold under three general classifications throughout China: Caidao (slicers), choppers and Gudao (cleavers). The general distinction lies in the thickness of the blade. Choppers are the most common all-purpose Chinese knife. Choppers have thicker blades than slicers but are not as thick and heavy as cleavers. Choppers are used for slicing, chopping and mincing meat, vegetables and herbs. Choppers are suitable for chopping through thin soft bones such as fish and poultry. Slicers, referred to as Caidao (vegetable knives) by the Chinese have the thinnest and sharpest blades. Slicers may have the same shape as choppers or they may have less width and appear similar to Japanese nakiri knives. Slicers are used for cutting vegetables, mincing herbs and slicing thin strips of meat for stir frying. The thin blade makes slicers unsuitable for chopping any bones. Cleavers, which are referred to as bone choppers by the Chinese have thick heavy blades. In Chinese homes, cleavers are typically used for chopping up pork ribs or for preparing hard-shelled seafood such as lobsters.

The average Chinese home uses some variation of the rectangular-bladed knife, usually around 18 cm (7 in) and 28 cm (11 in) in length. Traditional knives had a simply-forged, carbon steel blade with a long, ground bevel, but the typical Chinese chef's knife is now a stamped blade. The traditional handle is a full-length tang that is only about 1 or 2 cm (0.4 or 0.8 in), which is passed through a metal cap, then through the center of a round, wood dowel, then bent over and hammered into the end of the handle to retain it. Newer models, particularly those made in Japan or Germany, have full-width tangs and riveted or injection-molded handles, but these handles generally retain something of the traditional, round cross-section. The wide blade of Caidao keeps the cook's fingers well off the cutting surface and the round handle gives a nice "pivot point" for the cutting stroke. The blade has a curvature or rocker along its edge that is generally uniform, improving the knife's ability to chop and mince meats and vegetables. The broad rectangular blade also serves to scoop up chopped food for transport to the wok or bowl. Although it may seem unwieldy, skilled practitioners worldwide may be observed using this style of knife for everything − even carving and fine work normally accomplished with a paring knife.

== Accessories ==
=== Cutting board ===
A cutting board or chopping block is a kitchen utensil used in conjunction with a knife. It is a flat surface, generally made of either wood or plastic or composite material that protects counter tops and knives from damage. Glass and marble is not used because it severely dulls the blade and the knife can easily dangerously skid on the surface. Rather glass boards are used for decoration to cover surfaces which to cutting of food has damaged the finish. Marble boards are used for rolling out pastry as this aids in keeping it cool so it can be worked better.

=== Carving fork ===
A carving fork is a long, two-pronged fork − some 10 and 20 cm (4 and 8 in) − used to hold meat steady while it is being carved. Carving forks are often sold together with carving knives or slicers as part of a matched carving set.

=== Honing steel ===
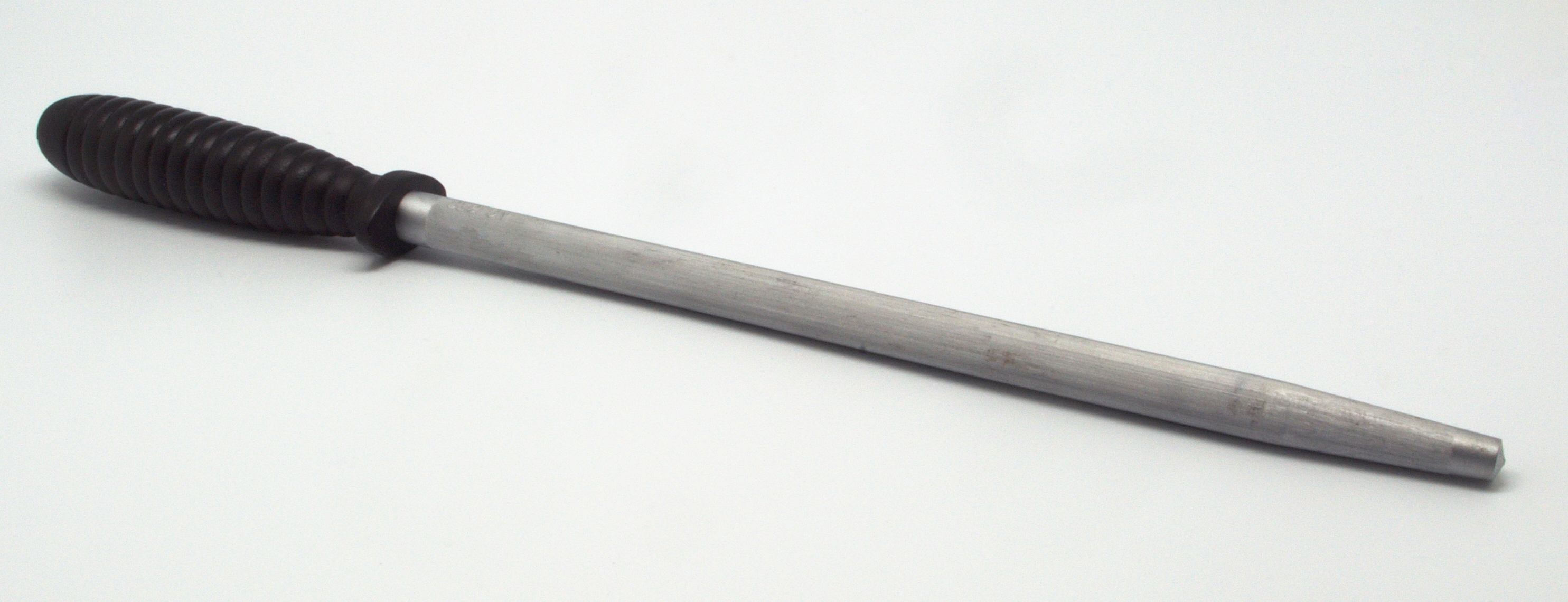
Honing steel

A honing steel (or butcher's steel or sharpening steel), does not sharpen knives, contrary to popular belief, but instead straightens the blade, while a sharpener sharpens the blade. A honing steel is a rod made of steel or ceramic, generally about 30 centimetres (12 in) long (although can be longer) and 6 mm to 12 mm (1/4 to 1/2 inch) thick. It is used to hone a knife blade after sharpening in order to restore the edge and improve cutting ability.

=== Shears ===
Kitchen scissors or shears can be used for many of the same jobs as knives, such as chopping herbs.

=== Knife block ===
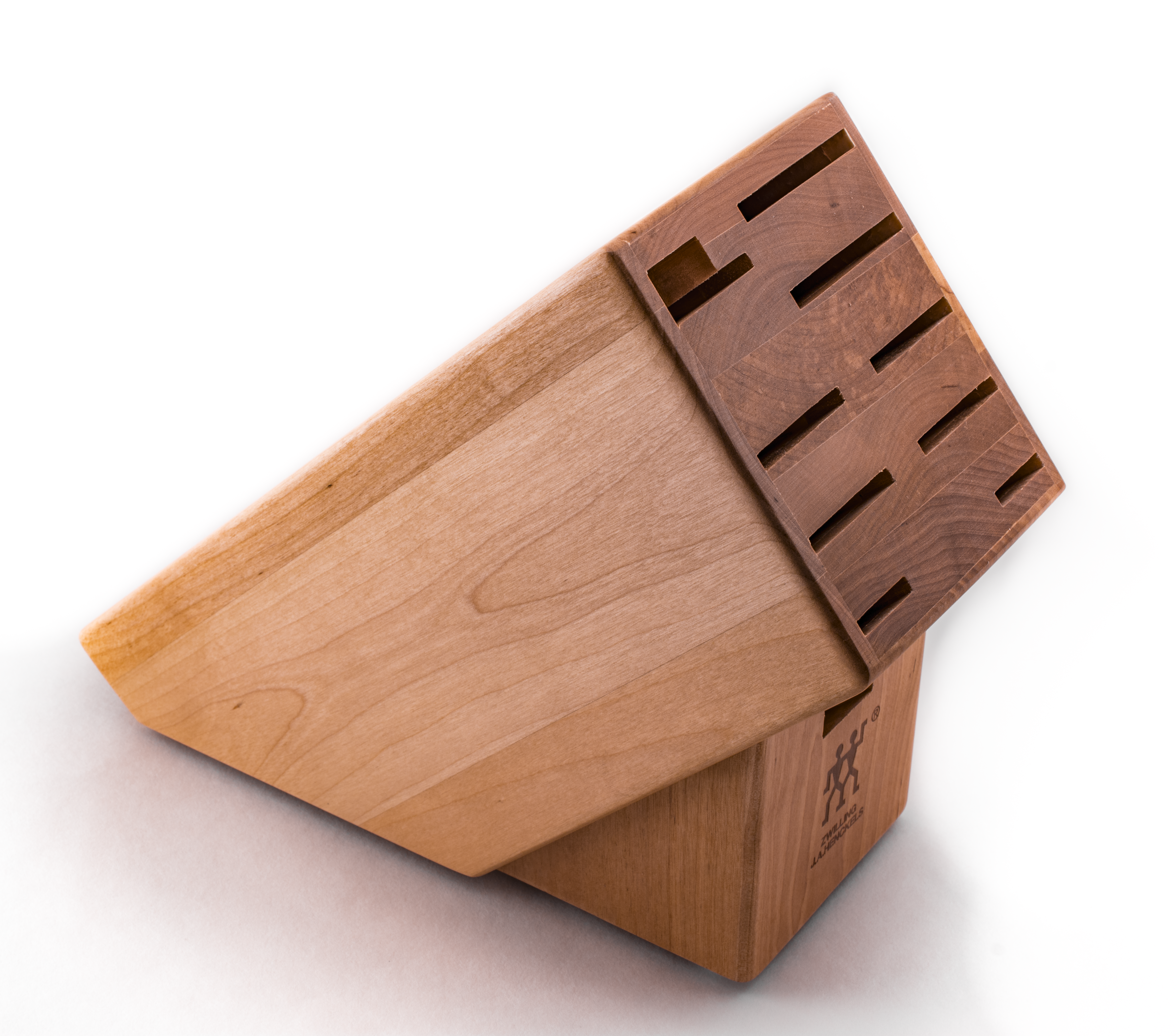
A knife block

A knife block is a common way to store knives safely and close at hand in the kitchen. This is an angled block of wood, steel, or other material, with slots for inserting knife blades, and sometimes other accessories, like kitchen scissors.

=== Cut-resistant gloves ===
Most commonly used in commercial kitchens, cut-resistant gloves (also referred to as cutting gloves) are used on the opposite hand to the cutting hand. They are for protecting this hand should the knife slip and slice into the user's off hand. They are typically made of kevlar or metal mesh. Other uses for cutting gloves in kitchens include using or cleaning meat/cheese slicers, hand mixing very hot or cold food items, and cleaning or using any type of sharp bladed machine.

== See also ==
- Cooking
- Cutlery
  - Table knife
- Kitchenware
  - Japanese kitchen knife
  - Kitchen utensil
  - Lame (kitchen tool)
- Metallurgy
  - Carbon steel
  - Stainless steel
- Tool
  - Blade
  - Tool use by primates
