= Murder of Jon James Casey =

2015 stabbing in Northampton, England

- Location: Northampton, England
- Date: 16 January 2015
- Target: Jon James Casey
- Weapon: Knife
- Perpetrator: Waijs Dahir
- Motive: Fight Escalation

On 16 January 2015, Jon Casey, a 35-year-old father of two, was fatally stabbed in Northampton, England after an altercation. He suffered stab wounds to the chest and died in hospital that evening. The suspect, Waijs Dahir, is believed to have fled the country after the incident, and a £35,000 reward remains for any information given that leads to his capture.

== Background ==
Jon James Casey was born in 1979 or 1980 to Siobhan Bowe and Stephen Casey. He was a father of two at the time and had been living in the Barrack Road / Kingsthorpe area at the time of the incident. Around the same time the suspect, Waijs Dahir, who was 21, attended the University of Northampton, and had been living on Semilong Road, Northampton, with Fatiat Braimoh. He was originally from Coventry. He had no prior offences and there was no indication of any prior motive that may have contributed to the attack.

== Attack ==
On the morning of 16 January 2015, Casey left the house at around 8 am, and was expected to be back home in the afternoon after he had picked his step-daughter up from school. Casey had been in Northampton close to the Lazeez restaurant, shortly before 5.30 pm, and became involved in an altercation with the suspect, as one witness who was at a Co-op cash machine nearby saw one male (Casey) gesturing "come on" to another male (Dahir). As one witness described the incident, "The black guy was punching the white guy with the black object in his hand. Punches to the face, using the black object as a grip to punch with. "The black guy would not leave him alone, he was constantly on him, punching the white guy. "He [Casey] wanted to get away, he was keeping his head down, terrified. He was keeping his head down to protect himself. He was taking a lot of punishment."

Following this Casey abruptly swung at Dahir, after which Dahir claimed he was "getting a tool", according to the witness. Two minutes later, the witness saw the male come back out of his front door on Semilong Road, which made him 'concerned' given the previous comment about "getting a tool". The "tool" turned out to be a large knife, described by a second witness as a "black object" that looked like a "handle of a knife, like a steak knife but bigger". Casey was then stabbed three times with the weapon, after which Dahir fled the scene. Casey was rushed to hospital after which he died of his injuries at Northampton General Hospital later that evening at around 6.20 pm.

== Investigation and aftermath ==
Northamptonshire police immediately investigated, after which they arrested a 19-year-old man on suspicion of the murder, although he was released shortly after. After Dahir was named the prime suspect it was found that he had travelled to Coventry, after which he fled the country on the same day of the attack. He is thought to have fled to either Kenya or Somalia, the latter of which does not have an extradition treaty with the UK. After this was determined an international warrant was issued for his arrest. An inquest into Jon Casey's death was held in August 2021, after which it was determined that Casey was “unlawfully killed” and described his attack as “viciously stabbed," despite conflicting witness accounts as to who started the altercation. On 16 January 2025 a ten-year anniversary appeal was issued to the public in an attempt to locate him. It was stated, “Although it’s been 10 years since Jon died, his family still carry their grief as if his murder happened yesterday and this is no surprise when you speak to them and understand just how deeply he was loved."

A £35,000 reward has been offered through the independent charity Crimestoppers to anyone who provides police with information that leads to Dahir's arrest.
