= Kitchen knife indentation =

Knife indentation is done away from the edge of a kitchen knife. A knife has either a rectangular or wedge-shaped cross-section (sabre-grind v. flat-grind), but may also have concave indentations or hollows, whose purpose is to reduce adhesion of the food to the blade, producing a cleaner and easier cut. This is widely found in Japanese knives, and in the West is particularly found in knives used for meat carving, soft cheese, and sometimes for vegetables.

These indentations take several forms:

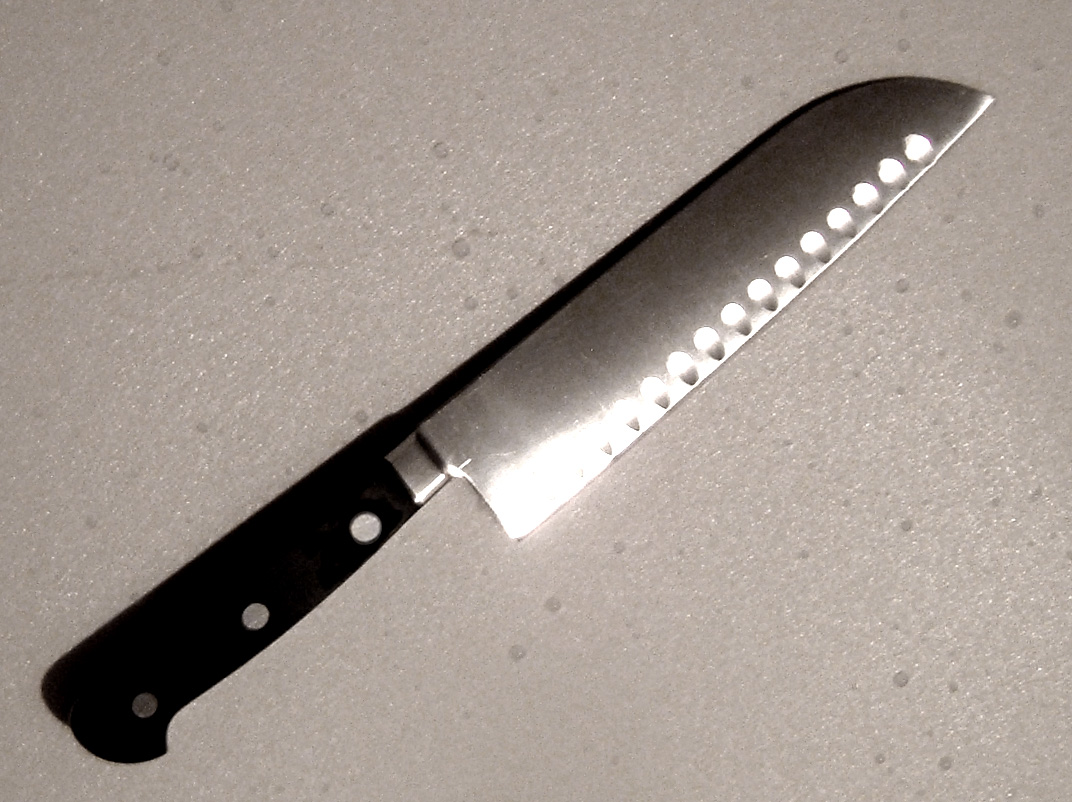
A Granton edge has air pockets along its side, as in this santoku-style knife.

- Granton knives have gently rounded flutings ground into the edge that alternate on either side of the knife and extend from the edge to the middle of the blade. This design was developed and patented in 1928 by William Grant & Sons Ltd A similar design, kullenschliff (kulle is Swedish for hill (or -more likely- a misspelling of the German word "Kuhle" meaning "hollow" or "deepening"); schliff meaning "cut" or grind in German), has oval flutings (kuhlen) hollowed-out of one or both sides of the blade above the edge. The Granton design is normally found on meat carving knives but have recently appeared on other types of knives, especially Western variations of the Japanese santoku. The indentations require a certain thickness, so they are more frequently used on thicker, softer blades, rather than on thin, hard ones. The design of scallop-sided blades is an attempt to ease the cutting and separation of meats, cheese, and vegetables. Some retailers have taken to calling these designs "hollow ground," probably confused by the hollowness of the indentations, whereas "hollow ground" properly refers to the cross-section of the cutting edge.
- Urasuki is a common feature of Japanese kitchen knives. While Japanese kitchen knives initially appear as a simple chisel grind (flat on the side facing the food, angled on the other), the apparently flat side is subtly concave, to reduce adhesion, and, further, the apparent chisel cut of the edge is actually a small bevel, as otherwise the edge would be weakened by the concave area above.

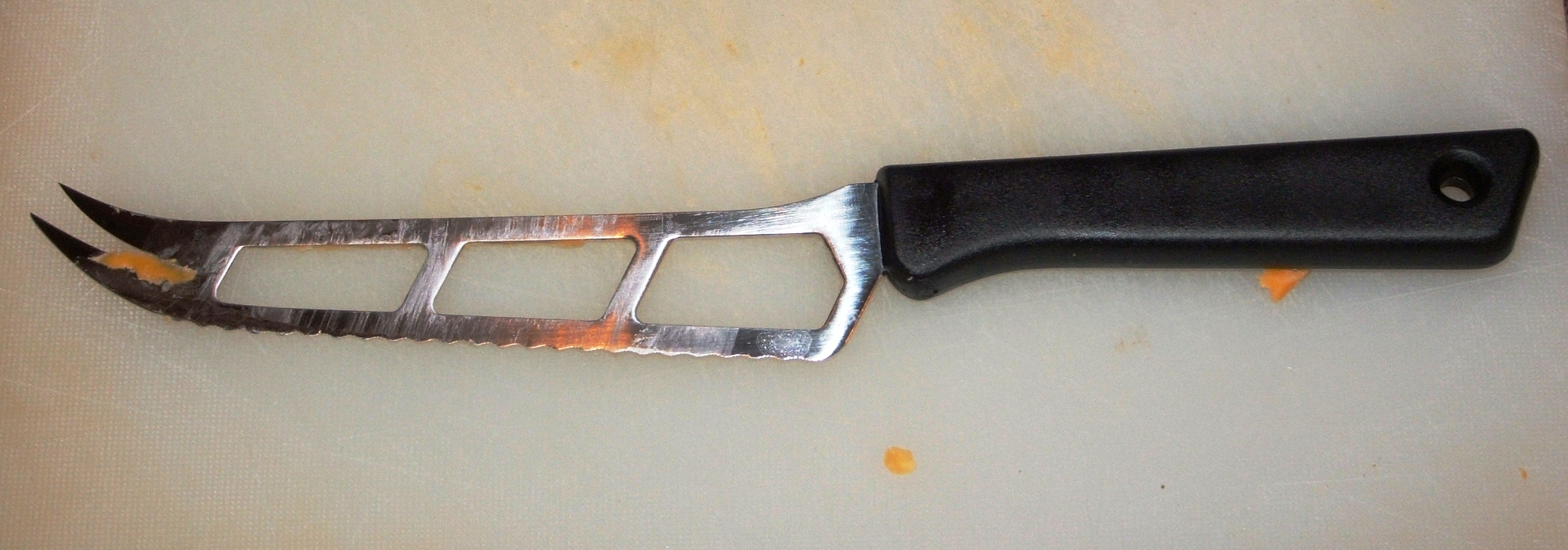
A knife for soft cheese, with holes to reduce adhesion.

- Holes may also be found in a blade, to reduce adhesion further. These are most found in knives for soft cheese.
