= Steakknife =

German punk rock band

Steakknife are a German punk rock band from Saarbrücken, Germany. The band lineup currently consists of Lee Hollis (vocals), L. Demon (guitar, vocals), Marc Mondial (guitar), Hell-G (bass), and Lorenzo Stiletti (drums). Over the group's career, Hollis and Stiletti have been the only consistent members through every lineup.

== History ==
Steakknife started off as Ankry Simons in 1990, a tribute band of the American punk rock group Angry Samoans. The band was formed as a side project of the jazzcore/post-hardcore outfit 2 Bad, which featured Hollis, Stiletti, bassist Thomas Hoheisel, and guitarist Stephan Junkes. The 2 Bad lineup was the same in the tribute group, however Ankry Simons featured guitarist and 2 Bad engineer Joke, and excluded 2 Bad saxophonist Martin Rink. Occasionally writing their own songs, the group released a 7' EP of original material in 1990 titled "Gotcha!" on X-Mist Records under the label's "Seven Inch Series" (or SIS) sublabel. The band also released a miscellaneous CD featuring the EP and bonus live recordings in 1992.

In early 1994, 2 Bad split up. The split caused renowned interest in the Ankry Simons project, and the band changed names from Ankry Simons to Steakknife, as a way of starting a new band. This lineup of the band recorded the "God Pill" record in late 1994, which released in 1995.

In late 1996, Joke left and was replaced by guitarist Rocket A. Polle. This lineup of Hollis, Stiletti, Hoheisel, Polle, and Demon would record the Songs Men Have Died For record in early 1997. Hoheisel and Demon would leave the band in late 1997 and were replaced by Hell-G and Marc Mondial respectively in 1998. This lineup would record the Plugged into the Amp of God album in 2000, which was released the same year on Nois-O-Lution.

Polle would leave the band in 2002, and guitarist L. Demon would return the same year. This lineup has been consistent since 2002. The band would record the Parallel Universe of the Dead album in 2006 and release it a year later on Rookie Records. The band's latest album, One Eyed Bomb, was released on September 25, 2015.

== Band members ==
=== Current lineup ===
- Lee Hollis - vocals (1990-present)
- Marc Mondial - guitar, vocals (1997-present)
- Stephan "Lucky Diamond/L. Demon" Junkes - guitar, vocals (1990-1997, 2002-present)
- Hell-G - bass (1998-present)
- Lorenzo Stiletti - drums (1990-present)

=== Past members ===
- Joke - guitar (1990-1996)
- Rocket A. Polle - guitar (1996-2002)
- Thomas Hoheisel - bass (1990-1997)

== Discography ==
=== Studio albums ===
- God Pill (1995)
- Songs Men Have Died For (1997)
- Plugged Into the Amp of God (2000)
- Parallel Universe of the Dead (2007)
- One Eyed Bomb (2015)

=== EPs ===
- Gotcha! (1990, pre-name-change to Steakknife)
- 3000 Dollar EP (1998)

=== Singles ===
- 1995:"My home is the gutter" - Split Single with 2BAD - X-Mist Records
- 1995:"The day Larry talked" - X-Mist Records
- 1996:"Driving in a dead mans car" - Steakhouse Records
- 1998:"3000 $ E.P." - EP - Steakhouse Records
- 2001:"The eye of the tiger" - Split single with CRAVING - Steakhouse Records
- 2005:"Abandoned" - Steakhouse Records
