= Table knife =

Type of cutlery

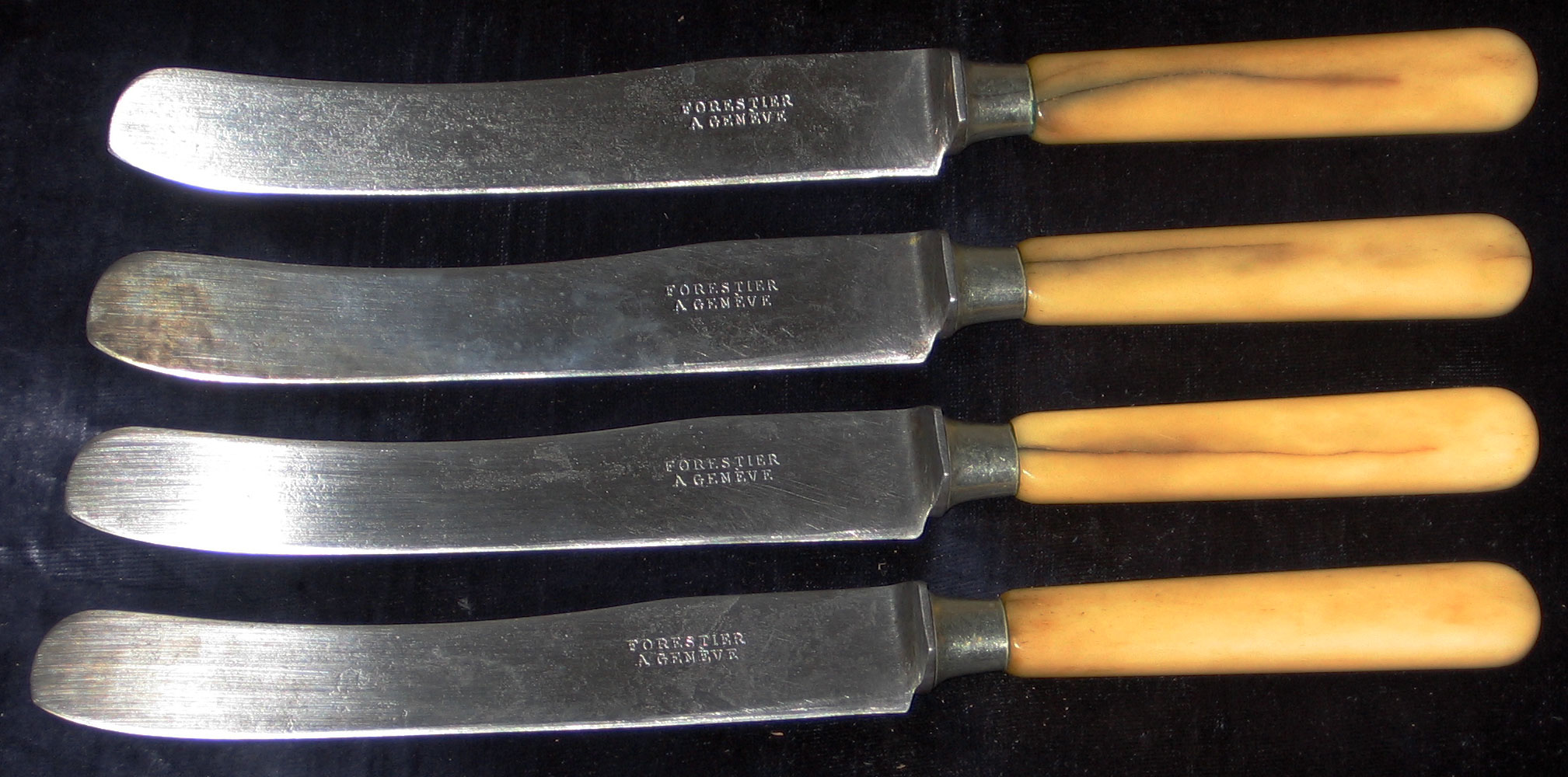
Table knives with bone or ivory handles; the maker's legend is stamped on the blade

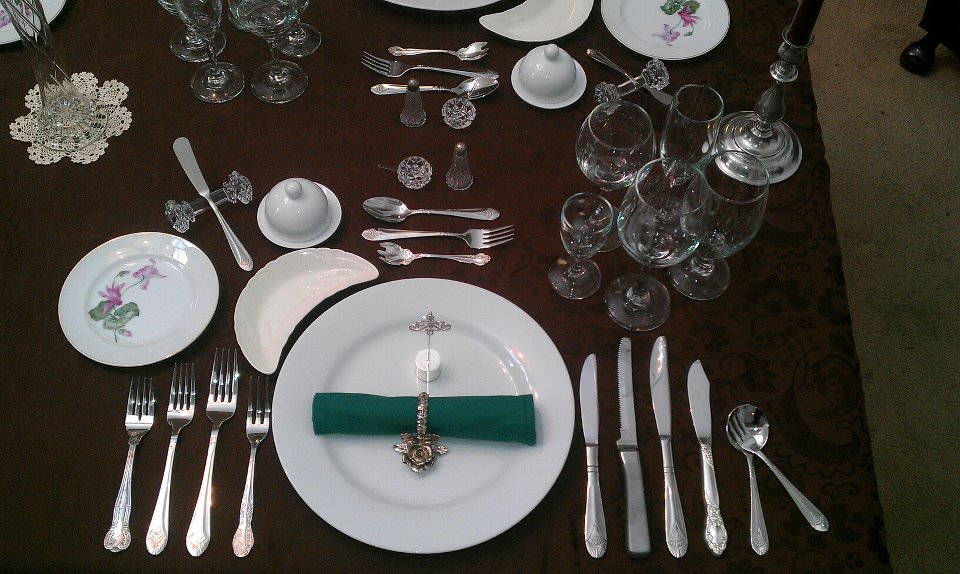
A formal place setting, including fish knife and fork

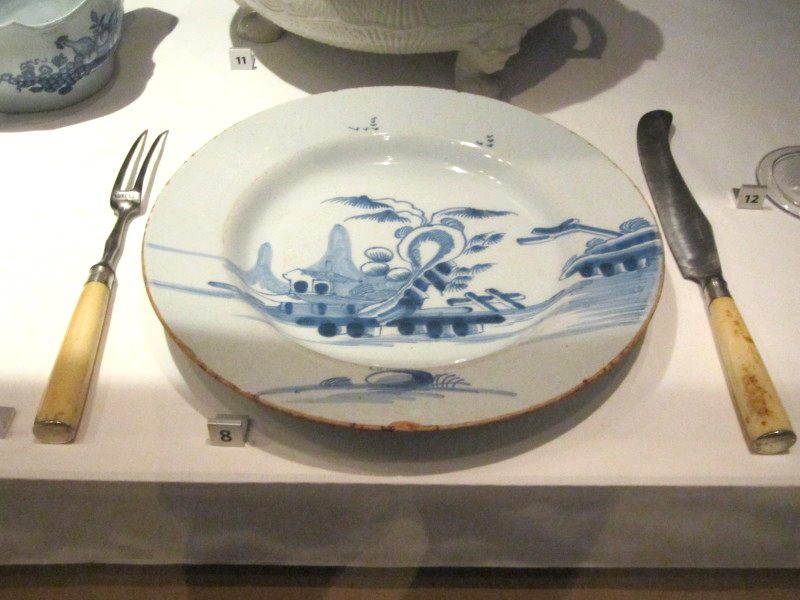
An English dinner setting, c. 1750

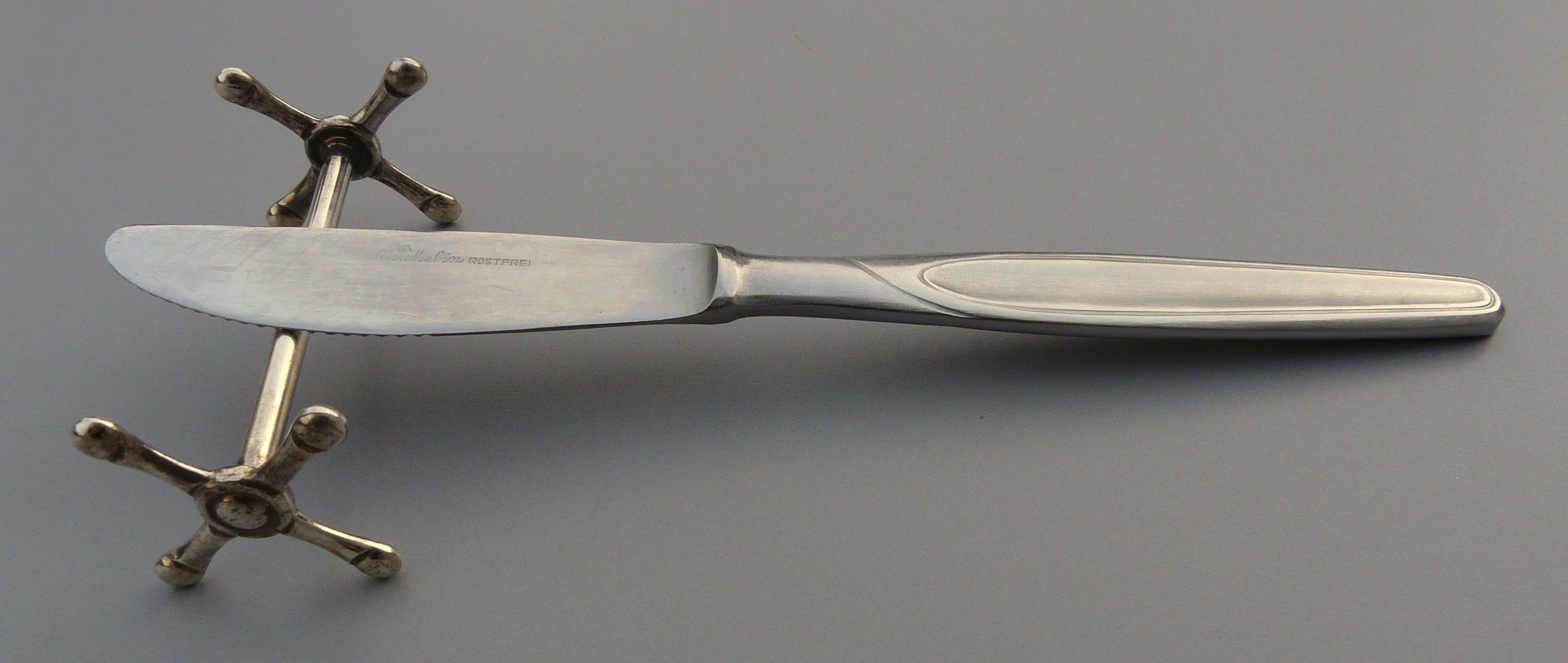
A stainless steel dinner knife on a knife rest

A table knife is an item of cutlery with a single cutting edge, and usually a blunt end – part of a table setting. Table knives are typically of moderate sharpness only, designed to cut prepared and cooked food.

== History ==
In early periods in the West, no special kind of knife was used at the table. Men and often women from all classes carried a knife around with them for a great variety of tasks, from pruning trees to personal protection or eating at table. The Anglo-Saxon and Germanic version of this was called the seax, often over a foot long. The original table knife was invented by Cardinal Richelieu. Guests at a meal brought their own cutlery, usually in a little case called a cadena. It was only in the 17th century that hosts among the elite again began to lay out cutlery at the table, although at an Italian banquet in 1536 for Charles V, Holy Roman Emperor, it is recorded that each guest was provided with knife, spoon and fork, evidently a rarity.

The distinguishing feature of a table knife is a blunt or rounded end. The origin of this, and thus of the table knife itself, is attributed by tradition to Cardinal Richelieu around 1637, reputedly to cure dinner guests of the habit of picking their teeth with their knife-points.

Later, in 1669, King Louis XIV of France banned all pointed knives in his Flemish provinces, insisting on blunt tips, in the hope that it would reduce knife crime.

In any table setting, the knife will typically be the piece to bear the maker's stamp on the blade. The English city of Sheffield is noted for its cutlery manufacture and many knives bear the city's name in addition to the maker's.

In the past the blades were typically of carbon and/or stainless steel, with handles of bone, wood, or ivory, but many modern examples are now made from a single piece of stainless steel for both handle and blade as per the example pictured.

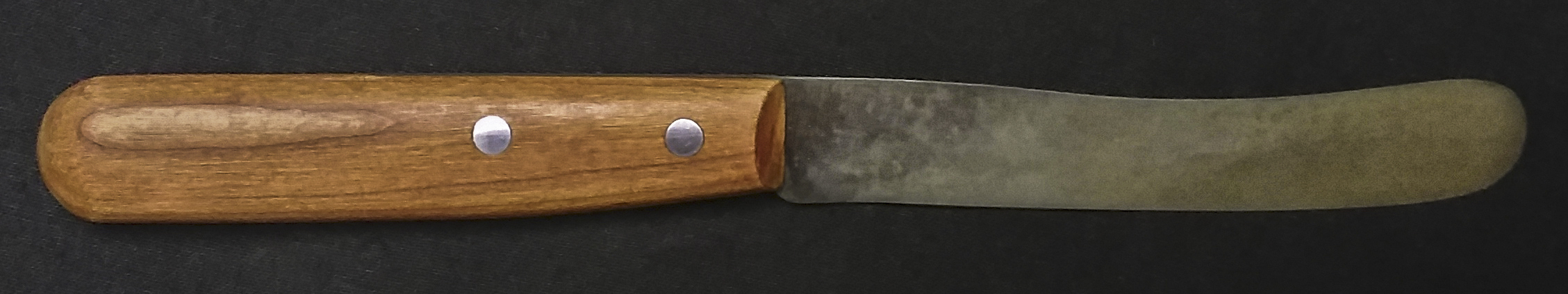
A table knife with a "Buckels" blade made of carbon steel

A special type of a table knife is a knife with a "Buckels" blade. It is also called "Old German table knife". These blades are usually very thin ground and additionally made of carbon steel. As a result, these blades are extremely sharp and it is not necessary to use an additional knife with a serrated edge to cut bread or buns.

In the past a large type of table knife may have been referred to as a "case knife". These knives were stored in cases, and were also known as sheath knives.

== See also ==
- Steak knife – table knife with a pointed end, and a very sharp, often serrated, cutting edge
- Butter knife
- Knork
- Sporf
