= Steak knife =

Sharp table knife used for cutting steak

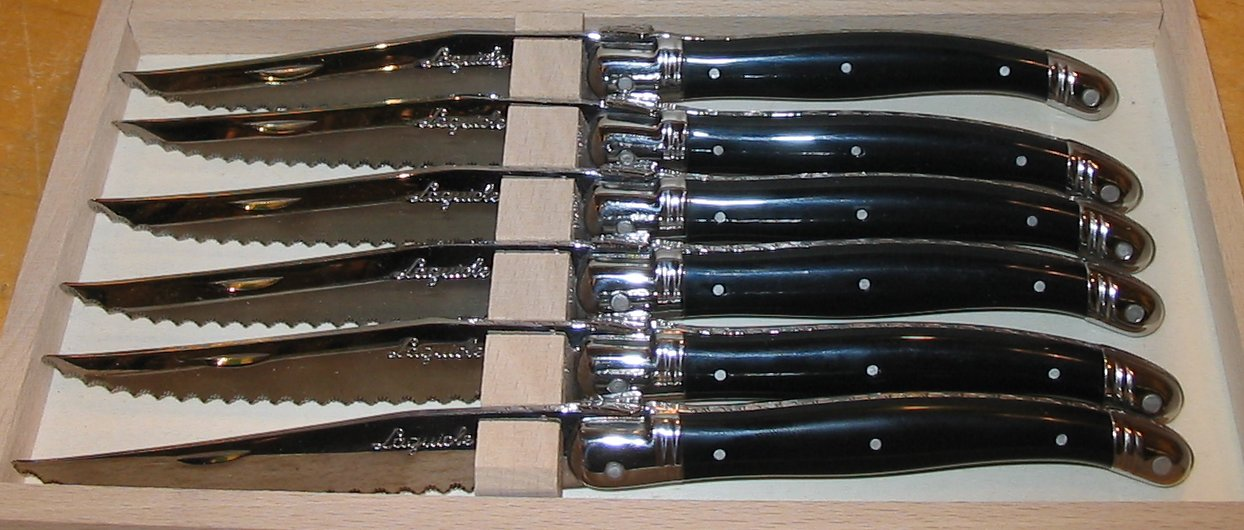
A set of black Laguiole steak knives

A steak knife is a sharp table knife designed to efficiently and effectively cut steak. This type of knife comes in a variety of styles and sizes; however, the design often used in a steakhouse typically features a partially serrated blade and wood handle.

== American style ==
Specialized steak knives emerged in the United States after World War II. Prior to World War I, all table knives were sharp, but required frequent upkeep—sharpening and polishing. With the decline in numbers of domestic workers, this upkeep became less feasible. Stainless steel became widespread following World War I. This did not require polishing, but did require sharpening due to manufacturing limits. After World War II, serrated stainless steel steak knives which required neither polishing nor frequent sharpening were commercially successful. In the 1950s heat treatment of stainless steel was introduced, allowing knives to remain sufficiently sharp without needing serrations, but by this point serrated steak knives had become well established and continued to be used.

== German style ==
German style is the classic western steak knife with high-quality stainless steel, full tang blade and western style handles.

== Other countries ==
In medieval Europe, a sharp knife and hands were the only eating utensils, and portable sharp knives continue to be used to this day in rural Europe, as in the Laguiole knife in France. By contrast, in most of Asia and Africa, knives have long been a utensil used only in the kitchen (meat either being cut into pieces or cooked so that it could be pulled apart with the hands); with only hands, spoons, or chopsticks used at the table.

== See also ==
- Kitchen knife
