= Capital punishment in Japan =

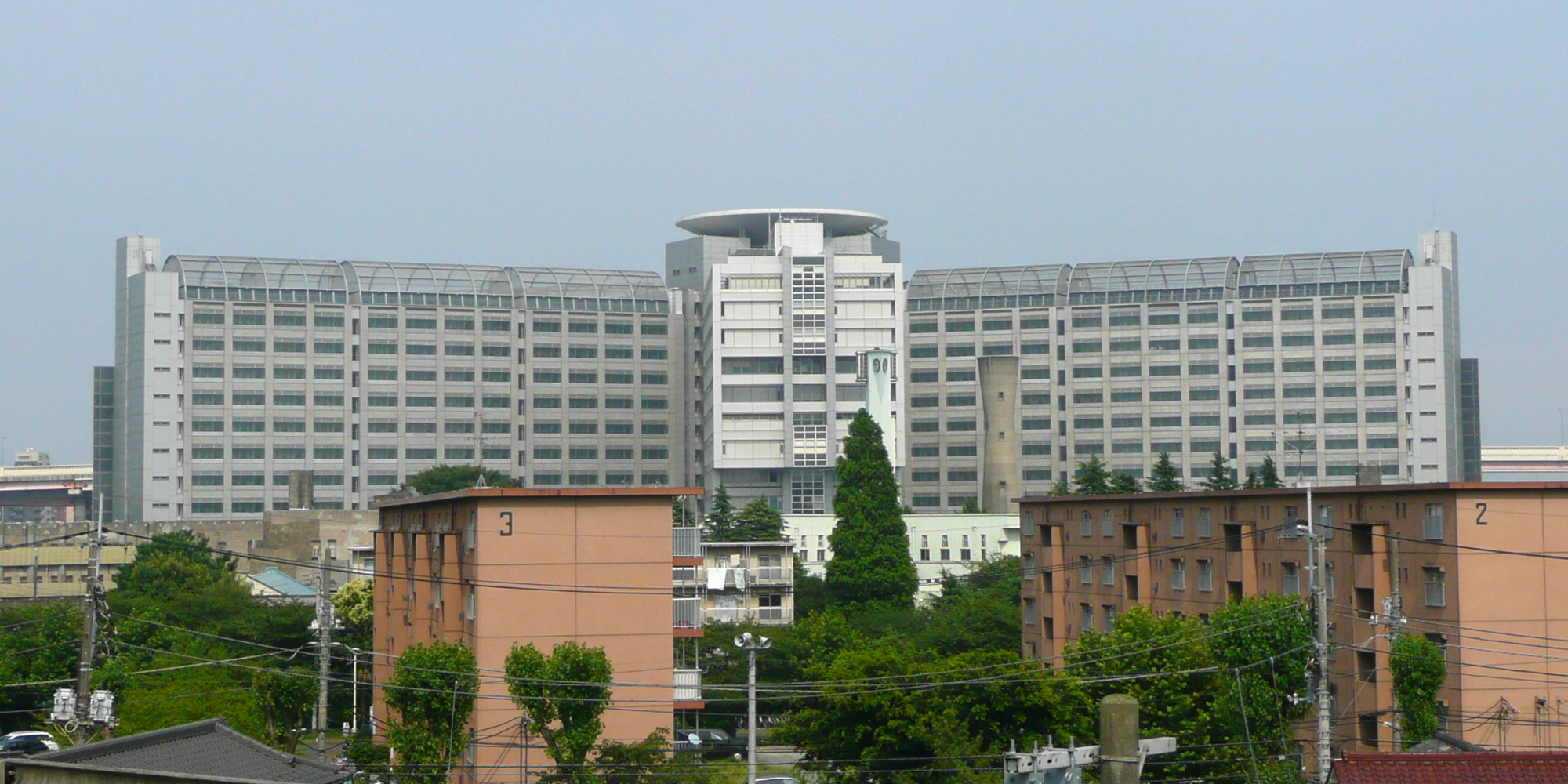
Tokyo Detention House, which houses one of Japan's seven execution chambers

Capital punishment is a legal penalty in Japan. The Penal Code of Japan and several laws list 14 capital crimes, though in practice it is applied only for aggravated murder. Executions are carried out by long drop hanging, and take place at one of the seven execution chambers located in major cities across the country. The only crime punishable by a mandatory death sentence is instigation of foreign aggression.

Death sentences are usually passed in cases of multiple murders, although there have been some extremely grave cases where individuals who committed a single murder have been sentenced to death and executed, such as those involving torture, extreme brutality or kidnapping with a demand for ransom.

Between January 2000 and July 2022, 98 inmates have been executed in Japan. As of 21 August 2026, 100 death row inmates were awaiting execution. The most recent execution was that of Sunao Takami on 21 August 2026 for the arson-murder of five people in a 2009 pachinko parlor fire.

Japan is one of four developed democracies worldwide to actively apply the death penalty. (Note: Alongside the United States, the Republic of China (Taiwan) and Singapore. Further, South Korea formally retains as well as issues sentences for the death penalty, but a moratorium on carrying out executions has been in place since 1998. Additionally, Japan and the United States comprise two out of the "Group of Seven" nations that carry out capital punishment.) In 2025, a government survey showed that about 83.1% of the Japanese population supports the death penalty. The figure was a 2.3% increase from a survey taken five years prior.

== History ==
According to the Kojiki, Japan's oldest historical book, the death penalty is believed to have first appeared in Japan in the first half of the 5th century during the reign of Emperor Nintoku. Methods of execution during this period included strangulation, beheading, and burning to death, and in some special cases, the death penalty was carried out and then exposed to public view.

The Taihō Code and the Yōrō Code stipulated two methods of capital punishment: beheading and strangulation. In 773, the method of beating to death was added for arsonists and thieves, bringing the total to three methods of capital punishment. The execution of the death penalty required the approval of the emperor.

Beginning in the Nara period (710–794), the death penalty was infrequently used, and the death penalty was abolished completely in the Heian period (794–1185). The death penalty was not used for 346 years following the execution of Fujiwara no Nakanari in 810, until it was revived during the Hōgen rebellion of 1156. However, during the Genpei War (1180–1185), the death penalty by sawing and crucifixion may have been carried out.

During the Kamakura period (1185–1333), the only method of capital punishment was beheading, and felons in particular were displayed to the public as an example after their execution. The Muromachi period (1333–1573) largely followed the Kamakura period method of capital punishment. On the other hand, seppuku, which appeared as a method of suicide in the Heian period, was first used as a method of capital punishment in this period.

From the Sengoku period to the Azuchi-Momoyama period, the methods of execution became more varied and cruel, reflecting the climate of warfare. The following methods of execution were used: skewering with a yari, burying them in the ground from the neck down and cutting off their heads with a bamboo saw, tying the criminal's legs to two oxen and tearing the legs apart, tying the criminal's legs to two wheels and tearing the legs apart, burning the criminal at the stake, boiling the criminal in a pot, wrapping the criminal in a woven straw rug and throwing him under water, and so on. During this period, capital punishment by crucifixion was also practiced, which is believed to have begun under Western influence.

In the early Edo period (1603–1867), there was no new code on capital punishment, and some of the methods of execution used in the Sengoku period, such as execution by oxen, were continued, but, in 1742, during the reign of Tokugawa Yoshimune, a new law was enacted that changed the method of capital punishment and lessened its severity. Under the new law, the only methods of capital punishment were sawing, crucifixion, beheading, burning at the stake, and seppuku. Burning at the stake applied only to arsonists, while seppuku applied only to the samurai class. Even for the same beheading, there were differences in the treatment of the body after execution, depending on the severity of the crime. If the crime was serious, the body was exposed to the public for three days, used for test cutting with a Japanese sword (tameshigiri), or had its property confiscated by the government. In the Edo period, sawing was a method of execution for criminals who had killed their lord, which was the most severe of the death penalties. The revised law by Tokugawa Yoshimune stated that the criminal should be buried in the ground from the neck down and exposed to the public for two days, and if any of the victim's relatives or passersby so requested, he or she should actually be sawed to death. After the law was revised, however, the sawing became a mere formality, and no saws were ever used in executions. In practice, the saw was placed next to the criminal, who was buried from the neck down, and exposed to the public for two days before he was finally executed by crucifixion.

In 1871 during the Meiji era (1868–1912), as the result of a major reform of the penal code, the number of crimes punishable by death was decreased and excessively harsh torture and flogging were abolished. In 1873, another revision resulted in a further reduction in the number of crimes punishable by death, and methods of execution were restricted to beheading or hanging. However, such sentiments would see a sharp reversal after World War I as the country descended into militarism up to World War II, and after the country's defeat, continuing towards post-war Japan until today.

Today, executions in Japan are carried out by long drop hanging, which is intended to cause death by breakage of the neck.

== Crimes permitting the imposition of the death penalty ==
Below is a table containing the various crimes for which the death penalty is provided, as well as a citation to the requisite legal provision itself and whether or not the penalty is mandatory or discretionary.

Capital crimes under the Penal Code of 1907
Article	Description	Sentencing
77(1)(i)	Ringleading a riot for the purpose of "overthrowing the government, usurping the territorial sovereignty of the State, or otherwise subverting constitutional order" (an insurrection)	Discretionary
77(2)	Attempting to ringlead an insurrection in equal circumstances	Discretionary
81	Instigating foreign aggression against Japan by conspiring with a foreign state	Mandatory
82	Aiding or assisting an enemy at war with Japan	Discretionary
108	Setting fire to and burning an inhabited building, train, tram, vessel or mine which is either a residential house or a place where a person is currently present in	Discretionary
119	Causing a flood to damage an inhabited building, train, tram, vessel or mine which is either a residential house or a place where a person is currently present in	Discretionary
126(3)	Causing death by overturning or destroying an occupied train or tram or capsizing, sinking, or destroying an occupied vessel	Discretionary
146	Causing death by polluting or poisoning a public water source	Discretionary
199	Homicide (murder)	Discretionary
240	Causing death in the course of a robbery	Discretionary
241(3)	Causing death in the course of a robbery in conjunction with a rape, or a rape in conjunction with a robbery	Discretionary

Capital crimes under the Act on Punishment of Organized Crimes and Control of Proceeds of Crime of 1999
Article	Description	Sentencing
3(1)(vii)	Performing a murder or homicide under orders of a criminal organization	Discretionary

Capital crimes under other legislation
Legislation	Article	Description	Sentencing
Explosives Control Act of 1884	1	Using an explosive with the intent of disturbing the peace or causing bodily harm or property to another person, or causing another person to use an explosive in like manner	Discretionary
Act on Punishment of Acts of Extortion by Hostage-taking of 1978	4	Murdering a hostage	Discretionary
Anti-Hijacking Act of 1970	2	Killing a person in the course of hijacking an aircraft	Discretionary
Act on Punishment of Acts Causing Endangerment to Aviation of 1974	2(3)	Crashing, capsizing, sinking, or destroying an aircraft in flight causing death	Discretionary
Anti-Piracy Act of 2009	2, 4	Seizing a ship and controlling its operation resulting in death OR stealing property onboard a ship resulting in death OR kidnapping a person onboard a ship resulting in death OR taking a hostage onboard a ship resulting in death	Discretionary

== System ==
The execution warrant issued for Shoko Asahara, who was executed on 6 July 2018 for his involvement in several crimes including the Tokyo subway sarin attack

=== Sentencing guideline – Nagayama Standard ===
In Japan, the courts follow guidelines laid down in the trial of Norio Nagayama, a 19-year-old from a severely disadvantaged background, who committed four separate robbery-murders in 1968 and was finally hanged in 1997. The Tokyo High Court originally gave him a life term, but, in 1983, the Supreme Court of Japan held it was an error, and quashed this sentence before sending Nagayama back on death row.

The court ruled that the penalty shall be decided in consideration of the degree of criminal liability and balance of justice based on a nine-point set of criteria. Though technically not a precedent, this guideline has been followed by all subsequent capital cases in Japan. The nine criteria are as follows:

1. Degree of viciousness
2. Motive
3. How the crime was committed; especially the manner in which the victim was killed.
4. Outcome of the crime; especially the number of victims.
5. Sentiments of the bereaved family members.
6. Impact of the crime on Japanese society.
7. Defendant's age (in Japan, the age of majority is 18).
8. Defendant's previous criminal record.
9. Degree of remorse shown by the defendant.

The number of victims killed is the most important criterion for imposition of a death sentence. A death sentence handed down for a single murder (previous convictions included) is considered "extraordinary".

In 2012, a research institute affiliated with the Supreme Court issued a report on application of capital punishment from 1980 to 2009. The study found that, while prosecutors very rarely demand the death penalty in cases of single murder, death sentences were passed in 32% of those cases where they requested it. On the other hand, prosecutors seek the death penalty almost systematically in cases of multiple homicide, and 59% of cases of double-murder and 79% of cases where three or more victims have been killed result in death sentences being passed.

The study also found that death sentences were passed in all cases of convicted murderers who killed again after being released on parole from life prison terms, and in all robbery-murder cases with three or more people killed.

Furthermore, in 5 of 10 kidnap-for-ransom cases in which one person was killed, the defendants were sentenced to death.

=== Judicial process ===
Since May 2009, district courts try capital cases using the lay judge system, where three professional judges sit with six randomly chosen citizens. Five votes of the nine-member court, including at least one professional judge, are required for issuing a conviction and any punishment, including death.

Japan has a civil law legal system; therefore, appeals courts retry both facts and law. High courts retry cases with only three judges and no lay judges, and can either reduce a death sentence to life or raise a life sentence to death. Ultimately, a five-member petty bench of the Supreme Court has the final say on the penalty, Article 411 of the Code of Criminal Procedure allows it to remand the case or change the punishment if the one handed down by the high court is "seriously unfair".

In only three cases since 1945 has the Supreme Court ruled a high court-imposed life sentence too lenient and ordered a retrial for death sentence. Among them are Norio Nagayama and Takayuki Fukuda, both under 20 at time of crime. The third case was that of a man convicted of murdering an elderly woman for robbery shortly after being paroled from a life sentence imposed for a similar crime.

=== Stays of execution ===
According to Article 475 of the Japanese Code of Criminal Procedure, the death penalty must be executed within six months after the failure of the prisoner's final appeal upon an order from the Minister of Justice. However, the period requesting retrial or pardon is exempt from this regulation. Therefore, in practice, the typical stay on death row is between five and seven years; a quarter of the prisoners have been on death row for over ten years. For several, the stay has been over 30 years. Sadamichi Hirasawa died of natural causes at the age of 95, after awaiting execution for 32 years, while Iwao Hakamada spent 58 years on death row before being found not guilty in a retrial.

=== Death row ===
Japanese death row inmates are imprisoned inside the detention centers of Tokyo, Osaka, Nagoya, Sendai, Fukuoka, Hiroshima and Sapporo. Despite Tachikawa and Takamatsu having high courts, neither city has a detention center equipped with execution chambers; executions imposed by the Tachikawa and Takamatsu High Courts are carried out in the Tokyo and Osaka Detention Centers. Those on death row are not classified as prisoners by the Japanese justice system and the facilities in which they are incarcerated are not referred to as prisons. Inmates lack many of the rights afforded to other Japanese prisoners. The nature of the regime they live under is largely up to the director of the detention center, but it is usually significantly harsher than normal Japanese prisons. Inmates are held in solitary confinement and are forbidden to communicate with their fellows. They are permitted two periods of exercise a week, are not allowed televisions and may only possess three books. Prison visits, both by family members and legal representatives, are infrequent and closely supervised.

As of 21 August 2026, 100 inmates currently sit on death row awaiting execution.

=== Execution ===
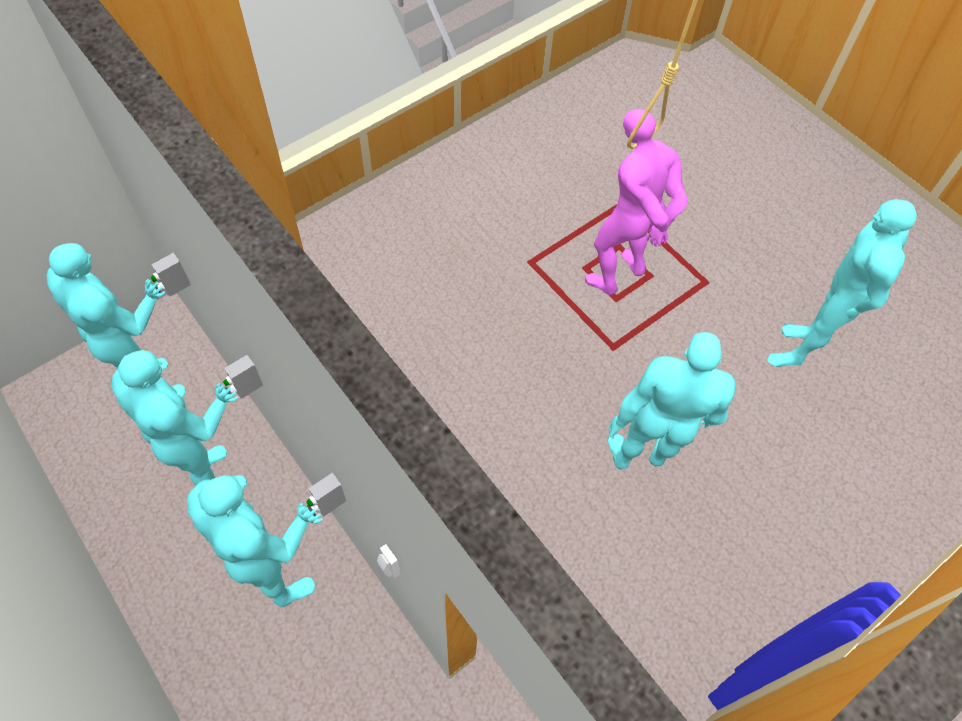
The execution chamber in Tokyo Detention House simulated with 3D graphics.

When someone convicted of a capital crime is to be executed in Japan, the execution warrant is signed by the Minister of Justice, after internal consultations within the justice ministry. As of 2007, according to a BBC report of statements in Japanese media, men condemned are kept in 'toilet-sized cells'. Once the final approval for execution is signed, it takes place within five business days. (By statute, the execution cannot take place on a Saturday or Sunday, but also not on a national holiday or between 31 December and 2 January.)

Executions reported in December 2007 were performed by hanging; the condemned were not told "that they are to be hanged until the last possible minute". As of 2008, the method of hanging was reported to be by "long drop".

Executions carried out by hanging take place in an execution chamber within the detention center. When the death warrant has been signed, the condemned prisoner is informed on the morning of their execution. Some report that the condemned is given a choice of a last meal, others reporting (as of 2007) that at the time the condemned last eats, they do not know that the meal will be their last. Chris Hogg of the BBC reports Amnesty International's perspective—which combines description and interpretation regarding conditions and foreknowledge—that condemned live under a "harsh regime and in solitary confinement with the ever-present fear of execution. They never know if each day will be their last." Hogg also expresses the view that, as of 2007, per the United Nations Human Rights Committee's International Convenants, this "failure to give advanced notice... is incompatible with articles 2, 7 and 10 of [that agency's convenant] on Civil and Political Rights...".

As of 2007, neither the prisoner's family nor the general public (nor, by inference, the condemned's legal representation) are informed before the execution has taken place. Until the 1970s, execution dates in Japan were announced to the condemned before the execution; however, cases of death row suicides before execution led to a change, with communication coming to 1-2 hours before execution. From about 1998 until 2007, Japan's Ministry of Justice only released the number of inmates executed on a given day; before then, a total was released annually with the Ministry not "confirm[ing] that executions had been carried out". As of December 2007, inmates' names were being announced on the day of execution.

== Death sentences for minors ==
Having signed both the Convention on the Rights of the Child and the International Covenant on Civil and Political Rights, which forbid any executions for those under the age of 18, Japan sets the minimum age for capital punishment at 18 (Juvenile Law § 51).

Prior to April 2022, the age of majority in Japan was 20 years of age (as per 1876 legislation). Although death sentences for minors aged 18 or 19 years were rare, those who committed capital crimes at those ages could be legally sentenced to death.

Between 1966 and 2022, nine juvenile criminals received death sentences that were finalized: Misao Katagiri, Kiyoshi Watanabe, Mitsuo Sasanuma, Fumio Matsuki, Sumio Kanno, Tsuneo Kuroiwa, Norio Nagayama, Teruhiko Seki and Takayuki Mizujiri. Eight of them have already been executed and Watanabe, who killed four people when he was 19 years old, remains on death row awaiting execution. Another one of the juveniles, Takayuki Fukuda, was sentenced to hang by the Hiroshima High Court on 22 April 2008, and upheld by the Supreme Court on 20 February 2012. A month after his 18th birthday, he killed and then raped a woman, along with murdering her baby.

On 18 January 2024, Yuki Endo was sentenced to death by the Kofu District Court for murdering the parents of his love interest and setting fire to their home in Yamanashi prefecture on 12 October 2021, thus becoming the most recent case of a minor facing the death penalty in Japan. Endo, who was 19 at the time of the double murder, was the first minor to be given the death sentence since Japan lowered the legal adulthood age from 20 to 18 in April 2022. On 2 February 2024, Endo's death sentence was finalized after Endo himself withdrew the appeal to the High Court, which was filed by his lawyer.

== Public debate ==
Support for capital punishment has consistently been high among the Japanese public. In a poll conducted between October and December 2024 of 1,815 Japanese adults by the Cabinet Office, 83.1% of respondents stated they agreed that the death penalty is "necessary in some cases", while 16.5% stated it should be abolished in all cases. This was a minimal change to the previous survey conducted in 2019.

When the question asked to choose between capital punishment and life imprisonment without parole, 61.8% selected the death penalty and 37.5% selected life without parole.

In 2021, Ipsos conducted a multinational online survey on capital punishment among 55 countries. The poll showed 74% of Japan citizens favoring the death penalty, tied with South Korea and more than any other of the surveyed countries, including the United States (67%).

At a 2003 trial, a Tokyo prosecutor presented the court a petition with 76,000 signatures as part of his case for a death sentence.

During the late 1980s, four death penalty defendants who were sentenced in the period just after World War II were exonerated by the Supreme Court. Charles Lane of The Washington Post claims that this embarrassed the Ministry of Justice, whose officials sincerely believed that such mistakes by the system were almost impossible. Between 1989 and 1993, four successive ministers of justice refused to authorise executions, which amounted to an informal moratorium.

The British newspaper The Times claimed that the death penalty was "effectively suspended" on 17 September 2009 with the appointment of Keiko Chiba, who was a member of anti-death penalty MPs caucus group, as Minister of Justice. However, no official policy statement was made in this regard. Chiba only stated that "I will cautiously handle (the cases) based on the duties of the justice minister." The Times' speculation was conclusively disproven when Chiba signed two death warrants and personally witnessed their executions.

=== Support ===
Supporters say that capital punishment is justified and only to those who have committed the most extreme of crimes — a single murder is not considered to warrant a death sentence unless there are additional aggravating circumstances, such as rape or robbery. In the 1956 debate, Japanese serial killer Genzo Kurita, who engaged in rape and necrophilia, was cited by the Diet as an example of a murderer whose crimes were atrocious enough to merit death. However, it is more the rarity of extreme crimes in Japanese society rather than an unwillingness of the authorities to carry out executions that has caused so few executions to take place.

Since executions resumed in 1993, a rise in street crime during the 1990s and the sarin gas attack on the Tokyo subway in 1995 have hardened attitudes amongst the public and the judiciary. Since 1999, there have been a series of cases in which criminals sentenced to life imprisonment have been given the death penalty after prosecutors successfully appealed to high courts.

On 18 March 2009, a district court sentenced to death two men for the murder of Rie Isogai. Fumiko Isogai, who lost her only child in this crime, launched a campaign to call for the death penalty on the three murderers in September 2007. Within ten days, her petition was signed by 100,000 citizens. She presented her petition for the death penalty with some 150,000 signatures to the District Public Prosecutors' Office of Nagoya on 23 October 2007. About 318,000 citizens had signed her petition by December 2008.

Although single murderers rarely face a death sentence in Japan, Takeshi Tsuchimoto, a criminal law scholar at Hakuoh University and former prosecutor of the Supreme Public Prosecutors' Office, expected that the recent trend toward harsher punishments, backed by the growing public support for capital punishment, would encourage the court to sentence Kanda and Hori (of the Rie Isogai case) to death. Major national newspapers published editorials in support of this unorthodox judgment on the premise that capital punishment is retained. The Asahi Shimbun and the Mainichi Shimbun, both major national liberal newspapers, wrote in editorials that the general public favored the judgment, and the Nikkei lent its support to it.

The Sankei Shimbun, a major national paper on the right, evaluated the judgement with a phrase "a natural and down-to-earth judgment of great significance". The Tokyo Shimbun expressed that capital punishment would be the inevitable sentence in consideration of the brutality of the murder and the pain that the victim's family felt. They also noted, however, that it would be difficult for citizen judges to determine whether death penalty would be appropriate in this kind of case under the lay judge system, which would be started in May 2009. Hiroshi Itakura, a criminal law scholar at Nihon University, said that this decision could be a new criterion for capital punishment under the lay judge system. However, one of the two men sentenced to death in the Isogai case had his sentence reduced to life imprisonment on appeal, and the Supreme Court refused to raise the punishment to death (but he was later sentenced to death in another murder case). The other defendant sentenced to death did not appeal and was hanged in 2015.

=== Opposition ===
Amnesty International argues that the Japanese justice system tends to place great reliance on confessions, even ones obtained under duress. According to a 2005 Amnesty International report:

Most have been sentenced to death on the basis of confessions extracted under duress. The potential for miscarriages of justice is built into the system: confessions are typically extracted while suspects are held in daiyo kangoku, or "substitute prisons", for interrogation before they are charged. In practice these are police cells, where detainees can be held for up to 23 days after arrest, with no state-funded legal representation. They are typically interrogated for 12 hours a day: no lawyers can be present, no recordings are made, and they are put under constant pressure to confess. Once convicted, it is very difficult to obtain a re-trial and prisoners can remain under sentence of death for many years.

Some critics claim that coerced confessions are responsible for Japan's high conviction rate; as of 2017, the conviction rate in Japan was 97.8%. Legal scholars, on the other hand, cite a low prosecution rate and a different method of calculating the conviction rate than in other countries as reasons for Japan's high conviction rate. According to them, Japanese prosecutors formally prosecute about 8% of the cases they accept. These are the cases that prosecutors believe are certain to result in a conviction. About 60% of the cases they accept are not prosecuted, and about 30% are summarily tried and punished with fines of 1 million yen or less.

Amnesty also reports allegations of abuse of suspects during these interrogations. There are reports of physical abuse, sleep deprivation and denial of food, water and use of a toilet. One of its biggest criticisms is that inmates usually remain for years (and sometimes decades) on death row without ever actually being informed of the date of their execution prior to the date itself, so inmates suffer due to the uncertainty of not knowing whether or not any given day will be their last. According to Amnesty International, the intense and prolonged stress means many inmates on death row have poor mental health, suffering from the so-called death row phenomenon. The failure to give advanced notice of executions has been stated by the United Nations Human Rights Committee to be incompatible with articles 2, 7 and 10 of the International Covenant on Civil and Political Rights.

The Human Rights Documentation Centre says that the issuance of death warrants by the Ministry of Justice may be politically motivated. In 1997, Norio Nagayama, a prisoner who committed the first of several murders as a juvenile, was executed during the sentencing phase of "Sakakibara Seito" for the Kobe child murders, also resulting in a high-profile juvenile murder trial – an attempt, according to South Asia Human Rights Documentation Center, to show that the harshest punishment could be administered to juveniles. According to The New York Times, the execution of Tsutomu Miyazaki after the Akihabara massacre was claimed to be a similar case.

Supporters say that capital punishment acts as a deterrent and has resulted in Japan's having one of the lowest murder rates in the world, after only Singapore, which also practices capital punishment. A 2020 study by Daisuke Mori of the Kumamoto University Faculty of Law, important for its thorough review and replication of all earlier such studies, carefully examined deterrence correlations and concluded that "neither the death sentence rate nor the execution rate has a statistically significant effect on... homicide and robbery-homicide rates" in Japan, while acknowledging both that important variables related to these rates may have been overlooked, and that the principle conclusion does not imply that these rates do not have a deterrent effect (as "failure to reject a null hypothesis does not imply that the null hypothesis is correct").

== See also ==
- Capital punishment in the United States
- Criminal justice system of Japan
- Criminal punishment in Edo-period Japan
- List of death row inmates in Japan
- Death by Hanging, a 1968 satirical Japanese film by Nagisa Oshima which criticizes the death penalty in Japan
- Judicial system of Japan
- Law of Japan
- Norio Nagayama
- Nobuto Hosaka
- Shizuka Kamei
- Life imprisonment in Japan
- List of executions in Japan since 1993
