= Criminal justice system of Japan =

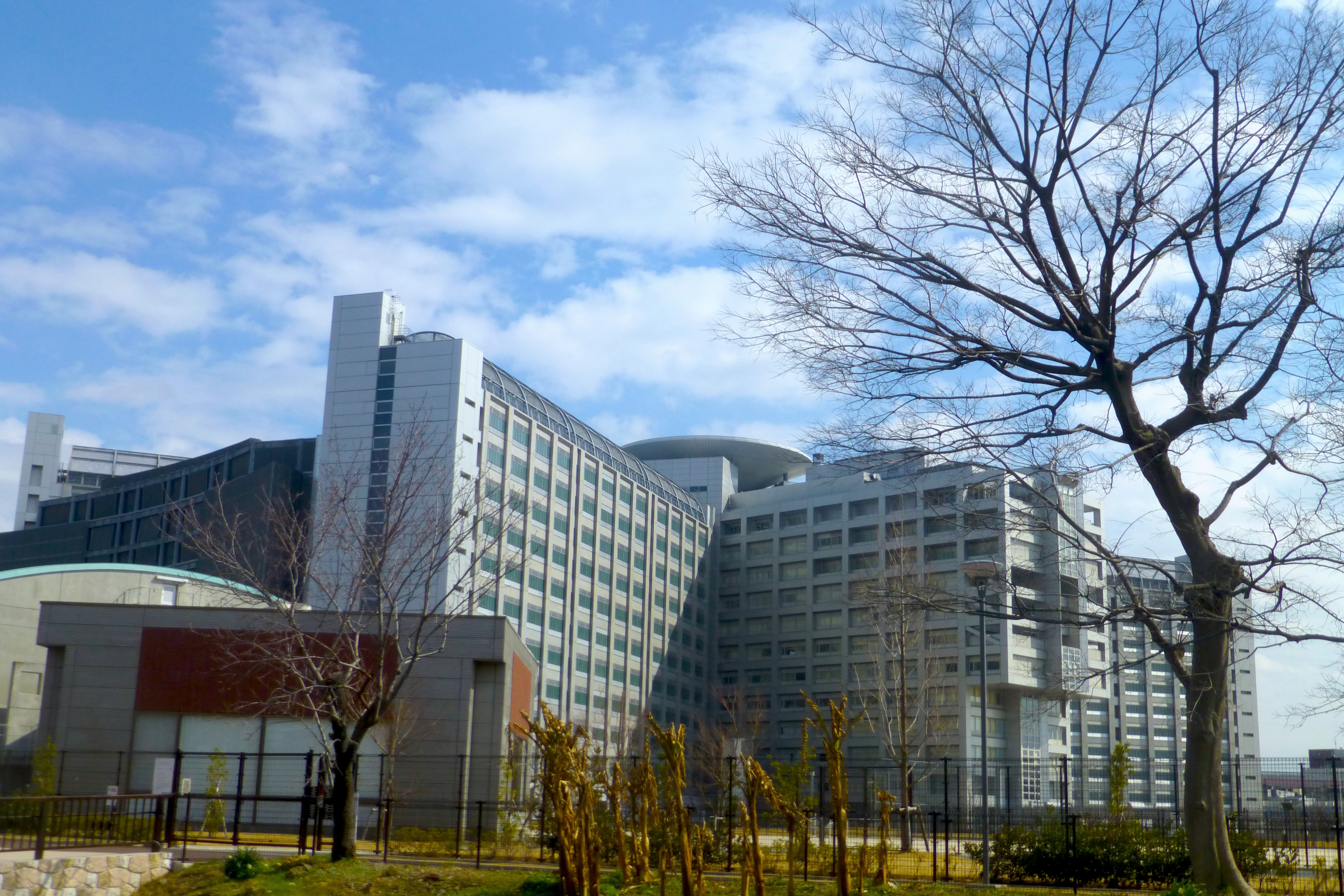
Tokyo Detention House

Within the criminal justice system of Japan, there exist three basic features that characterize its operations. First, the institutions—police, government prosecutors' offices, courts, and correctional organs—maintain close and cooperative relations with each other, consulting frequently on how best to accomplish the shared goals of limiting and controlling crime. Second, citizens are encouraged to assist in maintaining public order, and they participate extensively in crime prevention campaigns, apprehension of suspects, and offender rehabilitation programs. Finally, officials who administer criminal justice are allowed considerable discretion in dealing with offenders.

In 2021, the Japanese police recorded 568,104 crimes, of which 8,821 were cases of murder, robbery, arson, rape, sexual assault, indecent assault, kidnapping, and human trafficking, which are designated as major crimes (jūyō hanzai, 重要犯罪) by the National Police Agency. The arrest rate, which indicates the percentage of unsolved crimes recognized by the Japanese police by 2021 for which the perpetrators were arrested in 2021, was 46.6%. Of these, the arrest rate for cases involving murder, robbery, arson, rape, sexual assault, indecent assault, kidnapping, and human trafficking, which are designated as major crimes, was 93.4%.

As of 2001, Japan had a conviction rate of over 99.8%, even higher than contemporary authoritarian regimes. Scholars say the biggest reason for Japan's very high conviction rate is the country's low prosecution rate and the way Japan calculates its conviction rate is different from other countries. According to them, Japanese prosecutors only pursue cases that are likely to result in convictions, and not many others.

According to Professor Ryo Ogiso of Chuo University, prosecutors defer prosecution in 60% of the cases they receive, and conclude the remaining 30% or so of cases in summary trials. This summary trial is a trial procedure in which cases involving a fine of 1,000,000 yen or less are examined on the basis of documents submitted by the public prosecutor without a formal trial if there is no objection from the suspect. Only about 8% of cases are actually prosecuted, and this low prosecution rate is the reason for Japan's high conviction rate. According to Keiichi Muraoka, a professor at Hakuoh University, the 60% suspension of prosecution in Japan is due to excessive fear that prosecutors will lose the case and ruin their reputation.

After the lay judge system (saiban-in system, 裁判員制度) in which citizens participate, began in 2009, the prosecution and conviction rates have declined; in 2006, the prosecution rate for murder, including attempted murder, was 56.8%; as of 2017, the rate had dropped to 28.2%. The overall conviction rate in the first instance also dropped to 97.8% as of 2017. Although the Ministry of Justice noted that the decline in the prosecution rate began before the introduction of the lay judge system, some lawyers and scholars have pointed out that the introduction of the lay judge system, in which citizens participate, has led to greater emphasis on direct evidence and testimony at trial and more cautious judgment on inferences.

For example, according to Akira Sugeno, a lawyer who is a senior member of the Japan Federation of Bar Associations, a 2016 street crime in which three people were attacked with kitchen knives was charged with injury because there was no evidence of intent to kill, but before the system change it would have been charged as attempted murder because the judge's reasoning would likely have found intent to kill. They also pointed out that the reformed system has reduced lengthy interrogations and other forms of aggressive evidence-gathering, making it more difficult to create false convictions.

== History ==
=== 1868–1947 ===
Until the Meiji Restoration in 1868, the criminal justice system in Edo Japan was controlled mainly by daimyōs. Public officials, not laws, guided and constrained people to conform to moral norms. In accordance with the Confucian ideal, officials were to serve as models of behavior; the people, who lacked rights and had only obligations, were expected to obey. Such laws as did exist were transmitted through local military officials in the form of local domain laws. Specific enforcement varied from domain to domain, and no formal penal codes existed. Justice was generally harsh, and severity depended upon one's status. Kin and neighbors could share blame for an offender's guilt: whole families and villages could be flogged or put to death for one member's transgression.

After 1868, the justice system underwent rapid transformation. The first publicly promulgated legal codes, the Penal Code of 1880 and the Code of Criminal Instruction of 1880, were based on French models, i.e., the Napoleonic Code. Offenses were specified, and set punishments were established for particular crimes. Both codes were innovative in that they treated all citizens as equals, provided for centralized administration of criminal justice, and prohibited punishment by ex post facto law. Guilt was held to be personal; collective guilt and guilt by association were abolished. Offenses against the emperor were spelled out for the first time.

Innovative aspects of the codes notwithstanding, certain provisions reflected traditional attitudes toward authority. The prosecutor represented the state and sat with the judge on a raised platform—his position above the defendant and the defense counsel suggesting their relative status. Under a semi-inquisitorial system, primary responsibility for questioning witnesses lay with the judge, and defense counsel could question witnesses only through the judge. Cases were referred to trial only after a judge presided over a preliminary fact-finding investigation in which the suspect was not permitted to have counsel. Because in all trials, available evidence had already convinced the court in a preliminary procedure, the defendant's legal presumption of innocence at trial was undermined, and the legal recourse open to his counsel was further weakened.

The Penal Code was substantially revised in 1907 to reflect the growing influence of German law in Japan, and the French practice of classifying offenses into three types was eliminated. More importantly, where the old code had allowed very limited judicial discretion, the new one permitted the judge to apply a wide range of subjective factors in sentencing.

=== Since 1947 ===
After World War II, occupation authorities initiated reform of the constitution and laws in general. Except for omitting offenses relating to war, the imperial family, and adultery, the 1947 Penal Code remained virtually identical to the 1907 version. The criminal procedure code, however, was substantially revised to incorporate rules guaranteeing the rights of the accused. The system became almost completely accusatorial, and the judge, although still able to question witnesses, decided a case on the evidence presented by both sides. The preliminary investigative procedure was suppressed. The prosecutor and defense counsel sat on equal levels, below the judge. The laws on indemnification of the wrongly accused and laws concerning juveniles, prisons, probation, and minor offenses were also passed in the postwar years to supplement criminal justice administration.

In 2020, Japan ranked 9th in the sub-ranking "criminal justice" in the World Justice Project's Rule of Law Index, second highest among G7 countries. The World Prison Brief had the country incarceration rate in 2021 at 37 per 100,000 people, second lowest in the OECD and a reduction of 42% compared to 2006.

== Criminal investigation ==
In the Empire of Japan, the criminal investigation was presided over by prosecutors, like the Ministère public does in French law. Then, with the 1947 Police Law and 1948 Code of Criminal Procedure, the responsibility of investigations has been defined as uniquely resting with police officers. In order to fulfill this responsibility, criminal investigation departments were set up in each prefectural police department. After the establishment of the 1954 amended Police Law, these departments are supervised by the Criminal Affairs Bureau of the National Police Agency.

== Criminal procedure ==
The nation's criminal justice officials follow specified legal procedures in dealing with offenders. Once a suspect is arrested by police officers, the case is turned over to attorneys in the Supreme Public Prosecutors Office, who are the government's sole agents in prosecuting lawbreakers. Under the Ministry of Justice's administration, these officials work under Supreme Court rules and are career civil servants who can be removed from office only for incompetence or impropriety. Prosecutors presented the government's case before judges in the Supreme Court and the four types of lower courts: high courts, district courts, summary courts, and family courts. Penal and probation officials administer programs for convicted offenders under the direction of public prosecutors (see Judicial system of Japan).

After identifying a suspect, police have the authority to exercise some discretion in determining the next step. If in cases pertaining to theft, the amount is small or already returned, the offense petty, the victim unwilling to press charges, the act accidental, or the likelihood of repetition not great, the police can either drop the case or turn it over to a prosecutor. Reflecting the belief that appropriate remedies are sometimes best found outside the formal criminal justice mechanisms, in 1990, over 70 percent of criminal cases were not sent to the prosecutor.

== Juveniles ==
Police also exercise wide discretion in matters concerning juveniles. Police are instructed by law to identify and counsel minors who appear likely to commit crimes, and they can refer juvenile offenders and non-offenders alike to child guidance centers to be treated on an outpatient basis. Police can also assign juveniles or those considered to be harming the welfare of juveniles to special family courts. These courts were established in 1949 in the belief that the adjustment of a family's situation is sometimes required to protect children and prevent juvenile delinquency. Family courts are run in closed sessions, try juvenile offenders under special laws, and operate extensive probationary guidance programs. The cases of young people between the ages of fourteen and twenty can, at the judgment of police, be sent to the public prosecutor for possible trial as adults before a judge under the general criminal law.

== Citizens ==
=== Arrest ===
Police have to secure warrants to search for or seize evidence. A warrant is also necessary for an arrest, although if the crime is very serious or if the perpetrator is likely to flee, it can be obtained immediately after arrest. Within forty-eight hours after placing a suspect under detention, the police have to present their case before a prosecutor, who is then required to apprise the accused of the charges and of the right to counsel. Within another twenty-four hours, the prosecutor has to go before a judge and present a case to obtain a detention order. Suspects can be held for ten days (extensions are granted in most cases when requested), pending an investigation and a decision whether or not to prosecute. In the 1980s, some suspects were reported to have been mistreated during this detention to exact a confession. These detentions often occur at cells within police stations, called daiyo kangoku. A suspect can be taken into custody after arrest and before prosecution for up to 23 days.

=== Prosecution ===
The prosecution can be denied on the grounds of insufficient evidence or on the prosecutor's judgment. Under Article 248 of the Code of Criminal Procedure, after weighing the offender's age, character, and environment, the circumstances and gravity of the crime, and the accused's rehabilitative potential, public action does not have to be instituted, but can be denied or suspended and ultimately dropped after a probationary period. Because the investigation and disposition of a case can occur behind closed doors and the identity of an accused person who is not prosecuted is rarely made public, an offender can successfully reenter society and be rehabilitated under probationary status without the stigma of a criminal conviction.

=== Inquest of prosecution ===
Institutional safeguards check the prosecutors' discretionary powers not to prosecute. Lay committees are established in conjunction with branch courts to hold inquests on a prosecutor's decisions. These committees meet four times yearly and can order that a case be reinvestigated and prosecuted. Victims or interested parties can also appeal a decision not to prosecute.

=== Trial ===
Most offenses are tried first in district courts before one or three judges, depending on the severity of the case. Defendants are protected from self-incrimination, forced confession, and unrestricted admission of hearsay evidence. In addition, defendants have the right to counsel, public trial, and cross-examination. Trial by jury was authorized by the 1923 Jury Law but was suspended in 1943. A new lay judge law was enacted in 2004 and came into effect in May 2009, but it only applies to certain serious crimes.

The judge conducts the trial and is authorized to question witnesses, independently call for evidence, decide guilt, and pass sentence. The judge can also suspend any sentence or place a convicted party on probation. Should a judgment of not guilty be rendered, the accused is entitled to compensation by the state based on the number of days spent in detention.

Criminal cases from summary courts, family courts, and district courts can be appealed to the high courts by both the prosecution and the defense. Criminal appeal to the Supreme Court is limited to constitutional questions and a conflict of precedent between the Supreme Court and high courts.

The criminal code sets minimum and maximum sentences for offenses to allow for the varying circumstances of each crime and criminal. Penalties range from fines and short-term incarceration to compulsory labor and the death penalty. Heavier penalties are meted out to repeat offenders.

Capital punishment is a legal penalty for aggravated murder in Japan, and is usually imposed for multiple murders. Executions are carried out by hanging.

After a sentence is finalized, the only recourse for a convict to gain an acquittal is through a retrial. A retrial can be granted if the convicted person or their legal representative shows reasonable doubt about the finalized verdict, such as clear evidence that past testimony or expert opinions in the trial were false. On average, it takes 3 months to get a final judgment for a first trial.

==== Trial by lay judge ====
The first trial by citizen judge, saiban-in (裁判員; lay judge), began August 3, 2009, under a new law passed in 2004. Six citizens became lay judges and joined three professional judges to determine the verdict and sentence the defendant. Japan belongs to an inquisitory system of the criminal process. Therefore, a judge oversees the proceedings and also determines the guilt and the sentence of the accused. The citizen lay judges, as well as professional judges, are allowed to put forth questions to defendants, witnesses, and victims during the trial. The new system aims to invite the participation of the wider community and also provide a speedier, more democratic justice system, according to Eisuke Sato, the justice minister. The first trial by lay judge lasted four days, while some comparable criminal cases may last years under the old system. The historic trial of 72-year-old Katsuyoshi Fujii, who stabbed his 66-year-old neighbor to death, had substantial media attention. The selected lay judges must be voters, at least 20 years old, and possess a secondary-level education. Professional lawyers and politicians may not serve as lay judges in the new system. At least one judge must concur with the majority vote from the lay judges in regards to a guilty verdict; however, a majority not guilty verdict by the lay judges will stand. During the inaugural case, the citizens relied on the professional judges to help ascertain a sentence for the verdict decided upon, but felt confident in their interpretation of the trial arguments presented by the prosecution and defense.

== Conviction rate ==
One of the main features of the Japanese criminal justice system well known in the rest of the world is its extremely high conviction rate, which exceeds 99%. Some in the common law countries argue that this is to do with the elimination of the jury system in 1943; however, trials by jury were rarely held as the accused had to give up the right to appeal. Lobbying by human rights groups and the Japan Federation of Bar Associations resulted in the passing of a judicial reform bill in May 2004, which introduced a lay-judge system in 2009, which is often confused with the jury system in common law countries.

Japan's criminal justice system has been dubbed "hostage justice" (Japanese: 人質司法, Hitojichi shihō) by critics, due to cases of extended detention (up to 23 days) and forced questioning of detainees without a lawyer and of violations of the right to remain silent. In order to meet the high confession rate, Japan's justice system can cause more false confessions and wrongful convictions. Detention is not only used to ensure that suspects appear in court. Many legal procedures also violate the Constitution of Japan due to the right of physical freedom, the right to remain silent, and the right to a fair trial. Critics say prolonged detention and interrogations to force confessions violates the prohibition of torture. Some allege that international human rights are violated because there is no presumption of innocence, psychological torture is not prevented, and there are cases without access to counsel during interrogations. The latest criminal justice reforms, implemented in the 2000s, were largely unsuccessful in solving these flaws. Most interrogations are also not available in English, and so foreign detainees cannot understand it and are more likely pressured to confess quicker to get out of detention, even if they were innocent.

=== Analysis ===
J. Mark Ramseyer of Harvard Law School and Eric B. Rasmusen of Indiana University examine if the accusation is, in fact, warranted. In their paper ("Why Is the Japanese Conviction Rate So High?") they examined two possibilities. One is that judges who come under the control of central bureaucracy are pressured to pass a guilty verdict, ensuring high conviction. Another possibility is that, given that the non-jury system under the inquisition system has a predictable ruling on guilt, Japan's understaffed prosecutors working on low budgets only bring the most obviously guilty defendants to trial, and do not file indictments in cases in which they are not certain they can win.

The most likely reason why the Japanese conviction rate is so high is that prosecutors have a broad discretion to prosecute or not, taking into account many factors. The prosecutors may decide, for example, not to prosecute someone even if there is sufficient evidence to win at trial, because of the circumstances of the crime or accused. Article 248 of the Japanese Code of Criminal Procedure states: "Where prosecution is deemed unnecessary owing to the character, age, environment, the gravity of the offense, circumstances or situation after the offense, the prosecution need not be instituted." Thus, prosecutors in Japan have a very broad discretion in the decision to prosecute or not.

All Japanese court rulings are accessible in digital format; the two academics examined every case after World War II in which the court found the defendant not guilty. The result is mixed. Simple statistical analysis shows that the judge's later career tends to be negatively affected by a not guilty verdict. However, by examining the individual cases, the two academics found that all of those cases which negatively affected judges' careers had political implications (such as labor law or electoral law) and that the facts of the case (i.e., the defendants committing the accused deed) itself were never in dispute. However, judges delivered not guilty verdicts on technicalities such as statutes of limitation or constitutional arguments, which were subsequently reversed in a higher court. In cases in which the judge delivered a not guilty verdict because they ruled that there was insufficient evidence to ascertain that the defendants did the accused deed, the judge suffered no negative consequence. For this reason, the paper argued that Japanese judges are politically conservative in legal interpretation but are not biased in a matter of fact.

Japanese trials before the institution of the current lay judge system were discontinuous. The defense and the prosecutor would first gather in front of the judges and present the issue. Then, the court would enter recess, and both sides would go back to prepare their case. As they reconvened on different dates, they would then present each case, which the judges examined: the court would be put in recess again and each side would go back to gather further evidence. Some complex trials took years or even a decade to conclude, which is impossible under a jury system. During the questioning of evidence, judges were explicit about their opinions by the way they questioned the evidence, which gave greater predictability about the final verdict. For this reason, the prosecutor is far more likely to bring in the case where conviction is assured, and the accused is far more likely to settle. Moreover, the paper found that Japanese prosecutors have a far more pressing need to be selective. Out of a population of 125 million, the Japanese government only employs a mere 2,000 lawyers. Despite Japan having a low crime rate, such numbers create a significant case overload for prosecutors.

According to Bruce Aronson of New York University School of Law, Japan's conviction rate is misleading because it is the rate at which defendants admit guilt in the cases they are charged with. According to him, if the method of calculating the conviction rate in Japan is applied to the United States, the conviction rate of federal defendants in the United States in 2018 was also over 99%. According to him, when there is a discussion about Japan, it is easy to misunderstand because people quickly rely on broad cultural generalizations and stereotypes.

== Confessions in Japanese criminal investigations ==
=== Mandatory audio and video recording of interrogations ===
In Japan, mandatory audio and video recording of interrogations by police and prosecutors has been in place since the 21st century to prevent illegal outcomes such as forced confessions and to protect people from false accusations. In preparation for the introduction of the lay judge system (saiban-in system, 裁判員制度) in 2009, prosecutors began experimenting with audio and video recording interrogations in 2006 and police in 2008.

As of 2017, prosecutors had implemented full audio and video recording of interrogations in 98.4% of serious cases subject to saiban-in trials that resulted in the death of a person or other serious consequences. In addition, all cases of white-collar crime and corruption cases handled by the special prosecutor squads were recorded.

The amended law took full effect on June 1, 2019, and full audio and video recording became mandatory for serious cases, white-collar crimes and corruption cases handled by the special prosecutor squads, and cases involving mentally ill suspects who tend to easily follow the instructions of interrogators.

Including cases where audio and video recording is not mandatory, statistics for fiscal 2020, which runs from April 2020 to March 2021, show that prosecutors recorded 94% of cases, while police recorded only 12% of cases. The Tokyo Shimbun recommends making recording mandatory for all cases.

=== Claims by human rights organizations ===
Various human rights organizations have alleged that the high conviction rate is due to the rampant use of conviction solely based on forced confessions, including those that are innocent. Confessions are often obtained after long periods of questioning by police, as those arrested may be held for up to 23 days without trial. This can at times take weeks, during which the suspect is in detention, and are prevented from contacting a lawyer or family. Some academics have also claimed that Japanese judges can be penalized by a personnel office if they rule in ways the judicial office dislikes, and face biased incentives to convict. Using data on the careers and opinions of 321 Japanese judges, it was found that judges who engage in acquittals have worse careers. According to another study, cases that had a negative impact on judges' careers in Japan all involved political issues, such as labor or electoral laws, rather than disputes over the actual facts of the case (i.e., whether the defendants committed the alleged acts). In these instances, judges issued not guilty verdicts based on technicalities, like statutes of limitation or constitutional arguments, which were later overturned by higher courts. In contrast, when judges acquitted defendants due to insufficient evidence to prove they committed the alleged acts, they faced no professional repercussions. As a result, the study concluded that while Japanese judges tend to be politically conservative in their legal interpretations, they are not biased when it comes to determining the facts of a case.

Article 38 of Japan's Constitution categorically requires that "no person shall be convicted or punished in cases where the only proof against a suspect is his/her own confession". In practice, this constitutional requirement takes a form of safeguarding known as the "revelation of secret" (himitsu no bakuro, lit. 'outing of secret'). Because suspects are put through continuous interrogation that could last up to 23 days, as well as isolation from the outside world – including access to lawyers, the Japanese judiciary, and the public – it can be suggested that the court is well aware that confession of guilt can easily be forced. Consequently, the court (and the public) take the view that mere confession of guilt alone is never a sufficient ground for conviction. Many foreign people in Japan who are arrested cannot afford bail.

Instead, for confession to be valid evidence for a conviction, the Japanese court requires confession to include the revelation of verifiable factual matter that only the perpetrator of the crime could have known about, such as the location of an undiscovered body or the time and place the murder weapon was purchased, a fact about the crime scene, etc. Furthermore, to safeguard against the possibility that the interrogator has implanted such knowledge into the confession, the prosecutor must prove that such revelation of a secret was unknown to the police until the point of confession. For example, in the 1948 Sachiura murder case, the conviction was initially secured by the confession of the location of the body, which was yet to be discovered. It later transpired that the police had likely known the location of the body, and this created a possibility that the confession of this information could have been forged and implanted by the investigating police. This resulted in the higher court declaring the confession unsafe and reversing the verdict.

Activists claim that the Japanese justice system consider that prolonged interrogation of a suspect in isolation without access to lawyers is justified to solve criminal cases without risking a miscarriage of justice. In addition, the requirement that the revelation of relevant information by the accused must be unknown to the police, and that the prosecutor must examine the police investigation before the case is brought to the court, is seen as an extra layer of safeguarding for the validity of confession as evidence.

However, most miscarriages of justice cases in Japan are, indeed, the result of conviction solely based on the confession of the accused. In these case, (1) the record of sequence and timing of the police discoveries of evidence and the timing of confession is unclear (or even faked by the police), (2) the contents of the revelation of the secret has only weak relevance to the crime itself, or (3) the revelation of secret is so vague that it can only be loosely applied to the elements of the crime (prosecutor's fallacy). Serious miscarriage of justice cases in Japan involve police deliberately faking evidence (and insufficient supervision by the prosecutor to spot such rogue behavior) such as where the police already knew (or suspected) the location of the body or the murder weapon, but they fake the police record to make it appear that it is the suspect who revealed the location. During the 1970s, a series of reversals to death penalty cases brought attention to the fact that some accused, after intensive interrogation, had signed "as-yet-unwritten confessions", which were later actually filled in by investigating police officers. Moreover, in some cases, the police falsified the record so that it appeared that the accused confessed to the location of where the body was buried, yet the truth was that the police had written the location into the confession after the body was discovered by other means. These coerced confessions, together with other circumstantial evidence, often convinced judges to (falsely) convict.

Currently, the Japanese Federation of Bar Associations is calling for the entire interrogation phase to be recorded to prevent similar incidents from occurring. The International Bar Association, which encompasses the Japanese Federation of Bar Associations, cited problems in its "Interrogation of Criminal Suspects in Japan". Former Japanese Minister of Justice, Hideo Hiraoka, has also supported videotaping interrogations. Police and prosecutors have traditionally been opposed to videotaping interrogations, stating that it would undermine their ability to get confessions. The current office of prosecutors has, however, reversed their previous opposition to this proposal. Proponents argue that without the credibility of confessions supported by electronic recordings, the lay judges may refuse to convict in a case when other offered evidence is weak. It is also argued that recording of interrogation may allow for standards to be lowered in the "revelation of secret", where the confession must contain an element of the crime that police and prosecutor did not know about. Once the recording is introduced, it would become impossible for the police to forge a confession. Then, it may become possible to bring a conviction based on a confession of elements of the crime that only the perpetrator and the police knew.

=== Case studies ===
Within Japanese society, it is viewed that an arrest itself already creates the presumption of guilt which needs only to be verified via a confession. The interrogation reports prepared by police and prosecutors and submitted to the trial courts often constitute the central evidence considered when weighing the guilt or innocence of the suspect.

In October 2007, the BBC published a feature giving examples and an overview of forced confessions in Japan. In the Shibushi Case, 13 people were arrested and interrogated, but were found innocent in court after the presiding judge ruled that those who confessed did so "in despair while going through marathon questioning". In a different case, a man named Hiroshi Yanagihara was convicted in November 2002 of rape and attempted rape after a forced confession and apparent identification by the victim, despite an alibi based on phone records. He was cleared only five years later in October 2007 when the true culprit was arrested for an unrelated crime. These two cases damaged the international credibility of the Japanese police.

The issue of the extremely high conviction rates were brought into international scrutiny once again after the former CEO of Nissan, Carlos Ghosn, was arrested in 2018 over allegations of false accounting. Ghosn subsequently fled Japan on 30 December 2019 while awaiting trial, and brought the very topic up in an interview as to why he had to flee the country – stating he will never have a right to fair trial. In a statement, Ghosn stated that he would "no longer be held hostage by a rigged Japanese justice system where guilt is presumed, discrimination is rampant and basic human rights are denied." At a subsequent press conference, Ghosn added that "I did not escape justice. I fled injustice and persecution, political persecution".

== See also ==
- Capital punishment in Japan
- Hostage justice
- Law of Japan
- Public order and internal security in Japan
- Law enforcement in Japan
- Judicial system of Japan
- Penal system of Japan
- Rape in Japan
- Daiyo kangoku (substitute prisons under police control)
- International child abduction in Japan
