= Rape in Japan =

Violence in Japan

Rape in Japan is sexual assault involving sexual penetration carried out against a person without their consent in the nation. Victims and perpetrators include Japanese citizens, residents, and foreign nationals from a wide range of backgrounds and every social class.

Some are victims of drugging, alcohol-facilitated incapacitated rape, gang rape, kidnapping, threats, torture, murder, sexual slavery, and sex trafficking in Japan as well slavery in Japan. Cybersex trafficking, filmed rape, and coerced rape pornography are issues. Videos of rape, including incest and the molestation of minors, have been shared in chat rooms. Victims have been raped on public transportation and in residences, education facilities, workplaces, and other locations. Rapes during break ins and home invasions have occurred.

Victims suffer from physical and psychological trauma, including post-traumatic stress disorder, ostracization, and, at times, suicide. The contraction of sexually transmitted diseases and unwanted pregnancies from rape have occurred. Victims have lacked systemic support for counseling, therapy, and public services. There has been victim blaming and perpetuation of rape myths. Perpetrators have included, but are not limited to, athletes, hospitality workers, reporters, prosecutors, politicians, military personnel, students, teachers, and taxi drivers. Perpetrators have been acquainted with the victims or have been strangers.

Japanese courts and judges have been criticized for handing out light sentences and acquitting perpetrators. Some Japanese law enforcement have been censured for their lack of care concerning rape victim reports and investigations Japanese police have discouraged victims from reporting rapes. Rape cases have been dropped by police, but victims pursue civil cases; some result in settlements or low compensation. Victims who come forward have received backlash on social media and threats.

The extent of rape in the nation is unknown because of the lack of reporting and other factors, but there have been incidents that reached the public's attention.

== History ==
Rape in Japan has been recorded from ancient times to the present. Ishikozume executions were carried out against alleged perpetrators of rape in Ancient Japan. During the Edo period, power holders, such as Inoue Masamoto, raped women. During the Meiji, Taishō, and early Shōwa eras, rapes committed by Genzo Kurita, Ryuun Daimai, Satarō Fukiage, Seisaku Nakamura, and Yoshio Kodaira received media attention.

Rape was committed by Imperial Japanese Armed Forces personnel throughout the Empire of Japan during the Asia–Pacific War. Comfort women from Japan and other nations were sex trafficked and sexually assaulted throughout the Japanese mainland and Japanese-occupied territories. There was rape during the occupation of Japan and afterwards by United States Armed Forces personnel. The 1945 Katsuyama killing incident, Yumiko-chan incident, 1995 Okinawa rape incident, and other occurrences were reported. Rapes continue to be committed in Japan by U.S. service members and contractors. Rapes have led to protests against the US military presence in Okinawa and other prefectures. Sexual assaults have also been committed by personnel in the Japan Self-Defense Forces and by government workers.

Juvenile and adult rapes in the country's post-war included, but were not limited to, the rape, torture, and murder of Junko Furuta, the Super Free incidents, Johnny Kitagawa sexual abuse scandal, and crimes committed by Joji Obara, Kiyoshi Ōkubo, Koichi Shoji, Mamoru Takuma, Masato Uchishiba, Noriyuki Yamaguchi, Yasunori Suzuki, and Yukio Yamaji.

Rape media have been produced in Japan.

== Definitions ==
=== Types ===
In Japan, as in many other places, rapes can be divided into two main categories. One is "fushizen rape" (不自然), or relational rape, where the rape is carried out by a person the offended party already knows/has a relationship with and/or there is no particular physical violence involved. There is also "tsūjō rape" (通常), or assault rape, where you are, potentially violently, assaulted by an unknown person and the act of rape. It can be difficult to know where the difference lies between these. The majority of all rapes are relational rapes. In Japan, marital rape was considered to be non-existent, because when the woman says yes to marriage it is seen as giving permanent consent to sexual contact and has thus given up sexual autonomy. Due to the permanent consent, it is believed that rape cannot take place in this situation.

=== Legal ===
The legislation and definition of rape in Japan are defined in the Penal Code which was created in 1907. Until the legislation was changed in 2017, the legal definition of an act of rape was as follows: (Article 177) is when one uses force or threatening behavior to force oneself for vaginal intercourse. All other types of sexual abuse in Japan fall under the category of "Forcible Indecency", also called "indecent assault" (Article 176). Because the terminology used is so broad, this category includes everything from groping (chikan, 痴漢), to more serious sexual assaults such as rape by men etc. Thus, by legal definition, only women could be victims of rape and only men could rape. This changed when the law underwent a reform in 2017. The reform included recognition of male rape victims, a longer minimum statutory penalty and the ability for public prosecutors to indict an offender without requiring a victim to file a complaint. The reform didn't change the requirement for proscecutors to prove that violence or intimidation was involved or that the victim was incapable of resistance. In 2023 there was a second reform that broadened the definition of rape to any non-consensual intercourse.

== Statistics ==
The Japanese rape statistics are 20 times lower than the US, and the country has a very strong judicial system where over 99% of all criminal cases in court end in a conviction. However, this comparison is misleading as there are significant differences in the legal definition of "rape" in the US and Japan (at least before the Penal Code reform of 2023) and a high under-reporting rate in Japan. A Cabinet of Japan survey stated that one in fourteen women in the nation reported experiencing forced intercourse. Government figures in the 2020s reveal that 1 in 12.5, or 8.1 percent, of Japanese women have been raped. Of that number, less than 2 percent reported the sexual violence to the police.

=== Rape ===
Year	Known to police	Clearances	Arrests
1990	1548	1274	1289
1995	1500	1410	1160
2000	2260	1540	1486
2005	2076	1443	1074
2008	1590	1326	951
2009	1415	1163	918
2010	1293	1063	803
2011	1193	993	768
2012	1266	1097	858
2013	1409	1163	937
2014	1250	1100	919
2015	1167	1114	933
2016	989	970	875
2017	1109	1027	910
2018	1307	1190	1088
2019	1405	1311	1178
2020	1332	1297	1177
2021	1388	1330	1251
2022	1655	1401	1339
2023	2711	2073	1875

Cases where the perpetrator is a minor have their own statistical category, which means that no one between the ages of 14-19 is included in these figures.

=== Indecent assault ===
Year	Known to police	Clearances	Arrests
2007	7664	3542	2240
2008	7137	3555	2219
2009	6723	3563	2129
2009	6688	3563	2129
2010	7068	3637	2189
2011	6929	3550	2217
2012	7321	3946	2451
2013	7654	3967	2487
2014	7400	4300	2602
2015	6755	4129	2644
2016	6188	4207	2799
2017	5809	4320	2837
2018	5340	4288	2923
2019	4900	3999	2926
2020	4154	3766	2760
2021	4283	3868	2903
2022	4708	4062	3067
2023	6096	4813	3804

(Nearly 70% of the reported cases in this category are supposedly groping (called chikan, 痴漢) on public transport.)

== Anti-rape efforts ==
=== Government response ===
There has been an increase in sexual education discussing consent in schools. The government has organized public awareness campaigns. Child pornography laws in Japan have been passed in an attempt to reduce the rape of adolescents for commercial purpose.

=== Activism and advocacy ===
Individuals such as Shiori Itō and Koyuki Higashi have brought attention to the issues concerning rape in Japan.
