= Judicial system of Japan =

Judicial branch of Japan

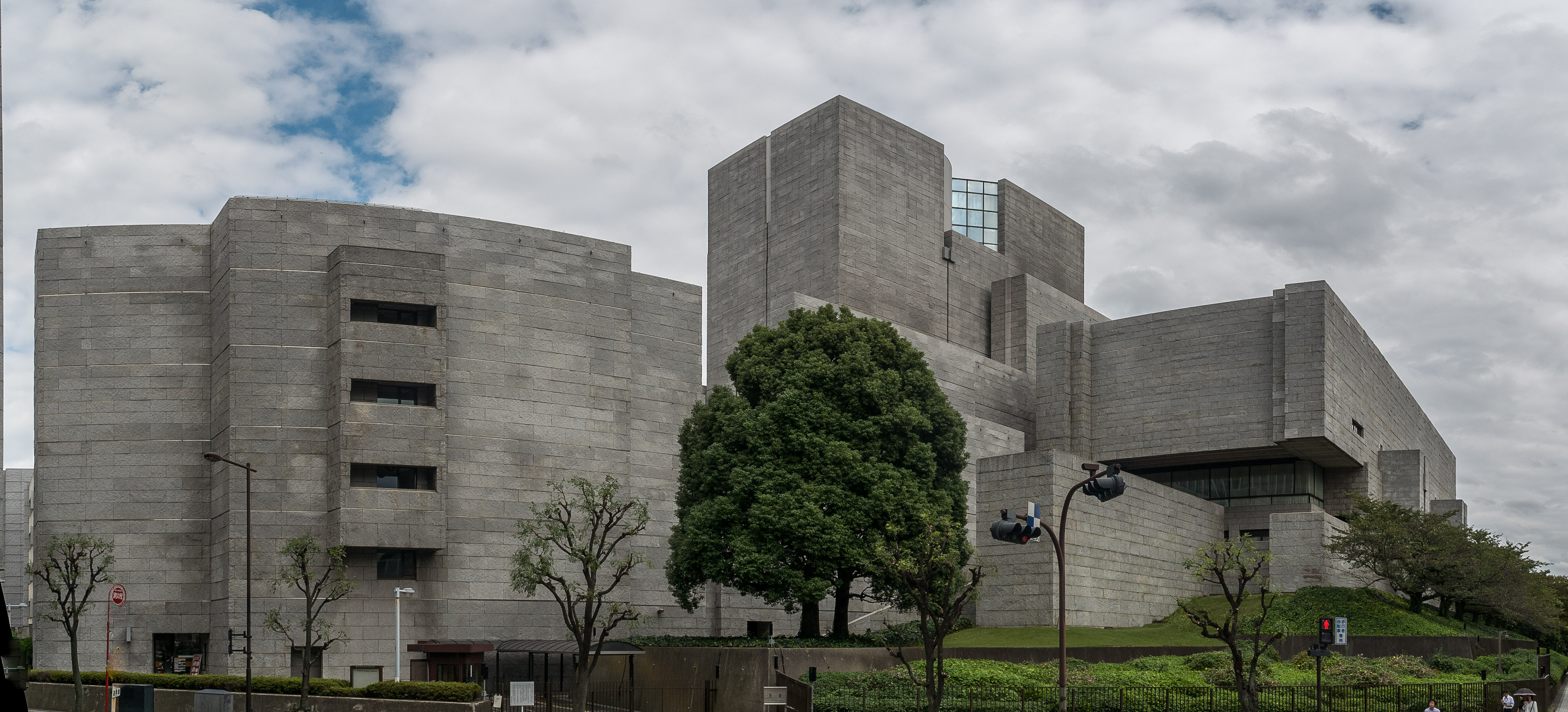
Supreme Court of Japan

In the judicial system of Japan, the Constitution of Japan guarantees that "all judges shall be independent in the exercise of their conscience and shall be bound only by this constitution and the Laws" (Article 76). They cannot be removed from the bench "unless judicially declared mentally or physically incompetent to perform official duties", and they cannot be disciplined by executive agencies (Article 78). Supreme Court judges, however, may be removed by a majority of voters in a referendum that occurs at the first general election following the judge's appointment and every ten years thereafter. The judiciary was far more constrained under the Meiji Constitution than it is under the present Constitution and had no authority over administrative or constitutional law cases. Moreover, the Ministry of Justice had complete and direct control over the courts' administrative affairs. Nonetheless, Professor John Haley argues that the courts maintained complete independence in the adjudication of particular cases. "Judicial independence from the political branches was emphatically established as a fundamental principle of governance in Article 57 of the Meiji Constitution. Of all branches of government only the courts exercised authority 'in the name of the Emperor' (天皇ノ名, Tennō no mei)." Haley argues that this was and remains a matter of great pride for Japanese judges and notes that "placed prominently in all courtrooms was the inscription 'in the name of the Emperor' as a meaningful reminder to imperial officials and subjects alike that the Emperor's judges were not subject to political control or direction."

A key feature of Japanese courts is the emphasis on wakai (和解) settlements by mutual agreement of the parties, with no loser or winner. These settlements have the same effect as a court judgement (Code of Civil Procedure, article 267; Civil Execution Act, article 22). For example, in 2016, the District Courts issued 63,801 judgments and orders, and 52,957 claims were solved by wakai settlement. In the Summary Courts, the numbers were 186,808 and 40,509 respectively.

Historically, courts in Japan were following the inquisitorial procedure, for example in a shirasu court (白州) in the Edo era, where the Chief Magistrate (奉行 bugyō) was also the prosecutor. After 1890, Japan was influenced by the European inquisitorial style of French and German law, where judges and the prosecutor had the responsibility to find the fact and apply the law. After 1948, the courts in Japan were influenced by the American adversarial system.

In 2021, similar to the previous year, Japan ranked 15th in the World Justice Project's Rule of Law Index, placing the country 3rd among the G7 economies.

== Courts ==
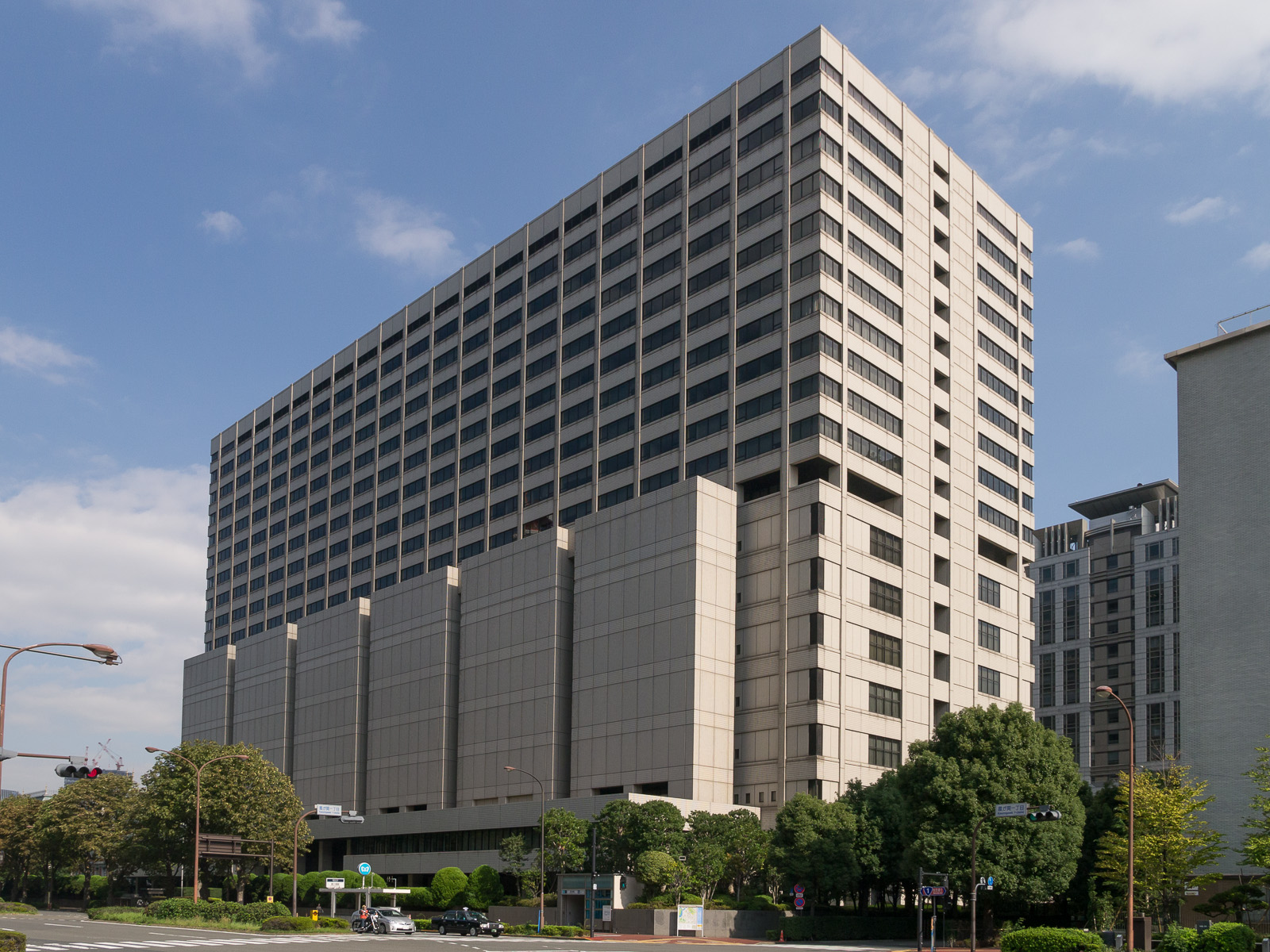
Tokyo High Court

Japan's court system is divided into four tiers.

At the first (lowest) of the four tiers of courts are the 438 summary courts (簡易裁判所 kan'i saibansho), staffed by 806 summary court judges. Summary court judges are not career judges. Qualification as a regular judge is not required. Instead, summary court judges are formally nominated for pro forma cabinet appointment by a special selection committee formally comprising all Supreme Court justices, the President (長官 chōkan) of the Tokyo High Court, the deputy procurator general, representatives of the bar, and others "with special knowledge and experience". They mostly handle small claims civil cases (disputes not in excess of ¥1,400,000), as well as minor criminal offenses. They are only able to imprison defendants in a few special cases. Summary courts are presided over by one judge. Civil cases in a summary court are appealed to a district court, while criminal cases are appealed to a high court.

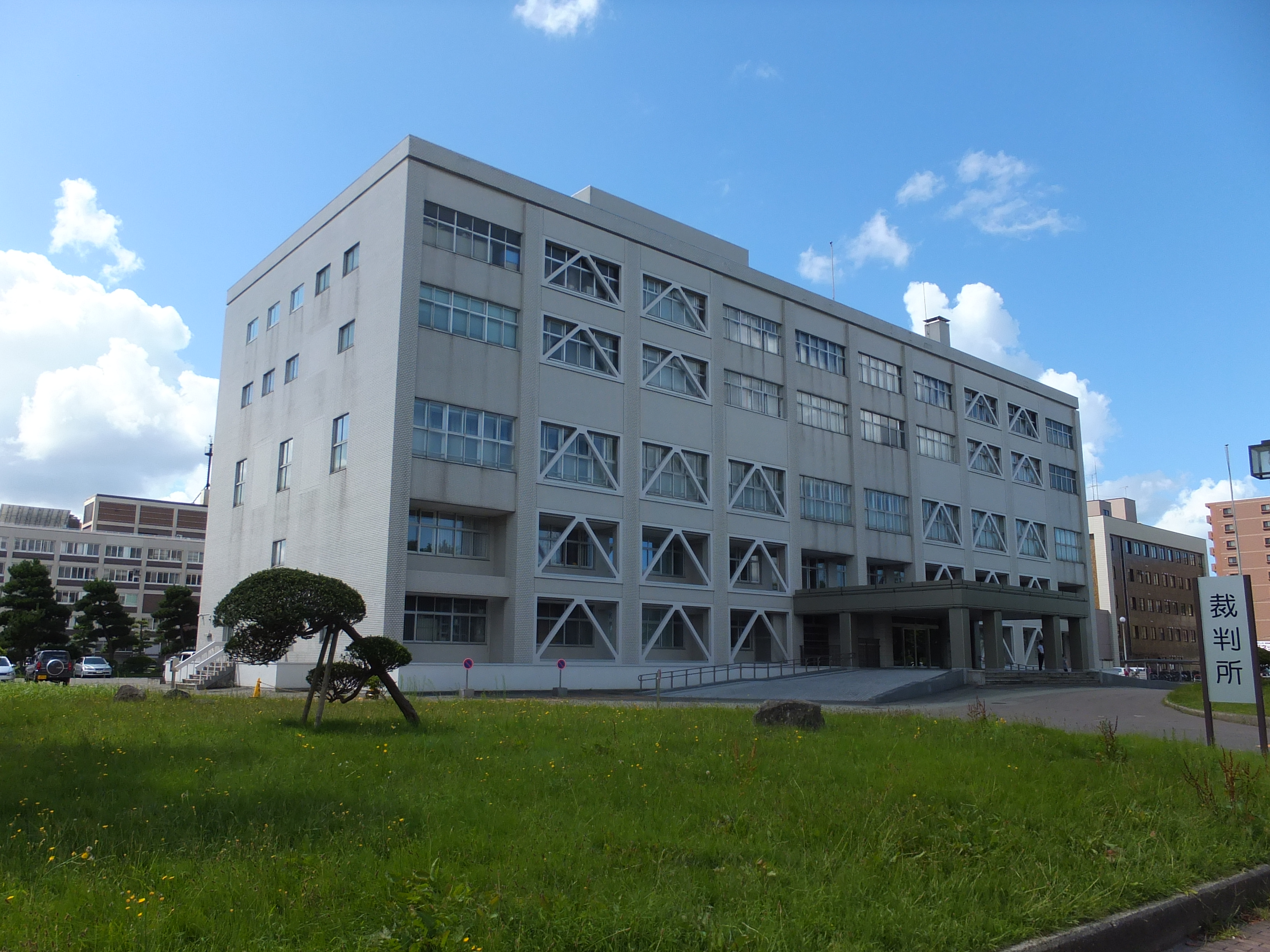
Akita District Court

At the second tier are the district courts (地方裁判所 chihō saibansho), the principal courts of first instance. There are 50 district courts in the prefectural capitals, with additional 203 branches. Except for minor cases, which account for 80 to 90 percent of all adjudicated cases, trials require a three-judge panel. These are the courts of general jurisdiction and the principal court of first instance. District Courts have original jurisdiction in felony cases and in civil cases where the disputed amount is over ¥1,400,000. They also handle bankruptcy hearings. Each District Court trial is presided over by at least one judge: two associate judges are also called in for appellate cases from Summary or Family Courts, or for criminal cases where the maximum penalty would be in excess of one year in prison. Attorneys sit on either side of the courtroom, facing the center. In a criminal case, the accused faces the judges from the rear of the courtroom. The witness box is in the center, also facing the judges. In 2022, a new courthouse was opened, “'Intellectual Property High Court and Nakameguro Branch of Tokyo District Court' (commonly called as 'the Business Court'), in which the Intellectual Property High Court and three specialized divisions of the Tokyo District Court－ the Commercial Division, the Insolvency Division and the Intellectual Property Divisions － moved from Kasumigaseki."

There are eight regional high courts (高等裁判所 Kōtō saibansho). They (Sapporo, Sendai, Tokyo, Nagoya, Osaka, Hiroshima, Takamatsu, and Fukuoka) serve defined circuits of several prefectures each; there are also "branch offices" in Akita, Kanazawa, Okayama, Matsue, Miyazaki, and Naha. There also exists the Intellectual Property High Court (知的財産高等裁判所 Chiteki-zaisan kōtō saibansho) in Tokyo, which is a special branch of Tokyo High Court. A high court usually sits in the same manner as a three-judge district court. Each court is led by a President, who is appointed by the Cabinet. An appeal to a high court is called kōso (控訴). The high courts are appellate courts for either kōso appeals from district court judgments, criminal judgments from summary courts, or, in civil cases tried initially in summary courts, second (jōkoku 上告) appeals limited to issues of law.

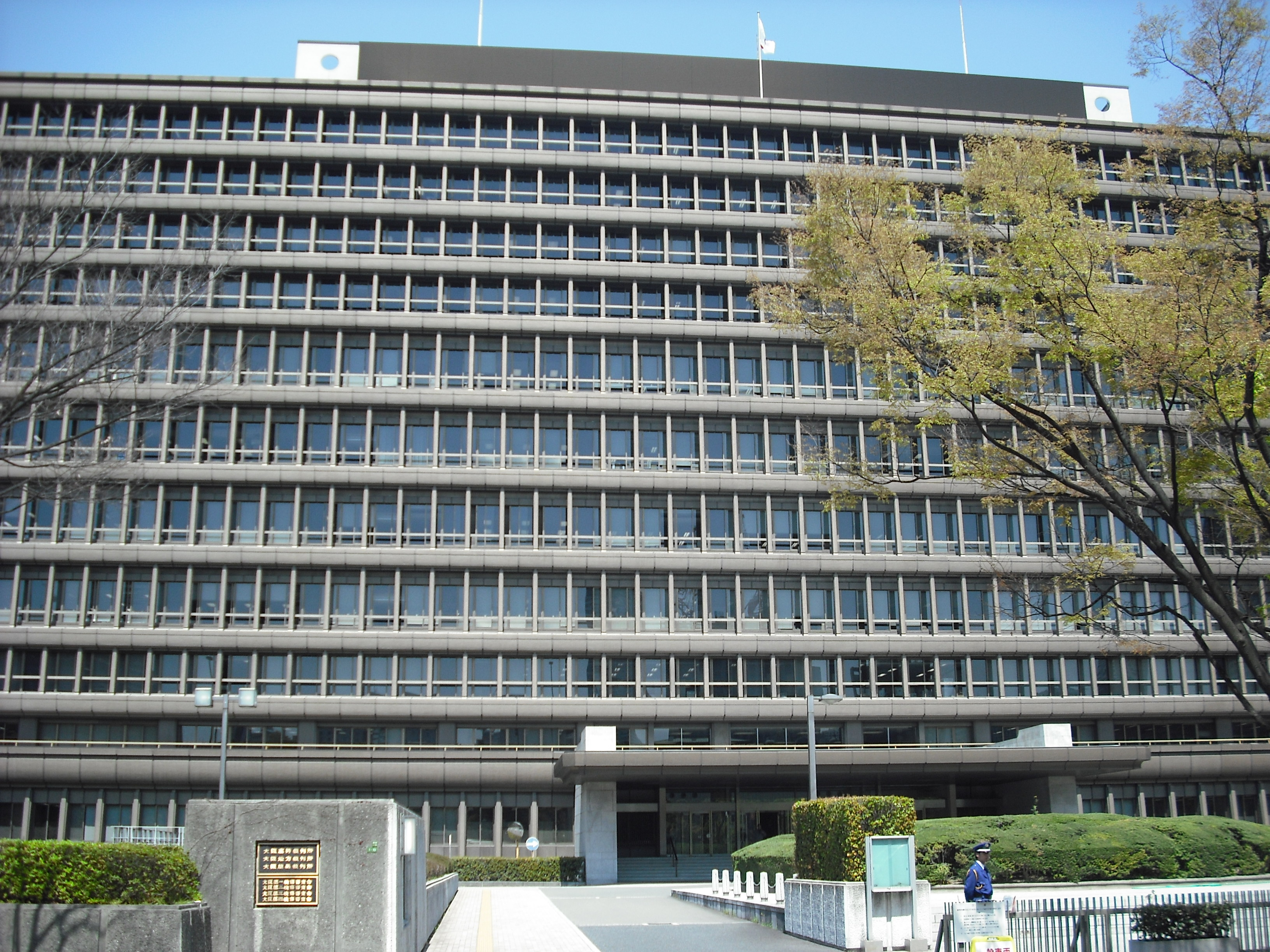
Osaka High Court

The prefectural district courts are administered under the regional high courts as follows:

- Tokyo High Court (Kantō region)
  - Tokyo District Court (東京地方裁判所), Yokohama (横浜, in Kanagawa), Saitama (埼玉), Chiba (千葉), Mito (水戸, in Ibaraki), Utsunomiya (宇都宮, in Tochigi), Maebashi (前橋, in Gunma), Shizuoka (静岡), Kōfu (甲府, in Yamanashi), Nagano (長野) and Niigata (新潟)
- Osaka High Court (Kansai region)
  - Osaka (大阪), Kyoto (京都), Kōbe (神戸, in Hyōgo), Nara (奈良), Ōtsu (大津, in Shiga), Wakayama (和歌山)
- Nagoya High Court (Chūbu region)
  - Nagoya District Court (名古屋, in Aichi), Tsu (津, in Mie), Gifu (岐阜)
    - Kanazawa (金沢, in Ishikawa), Fukui (福井), Toyama (富山)
- Hiroshima High Court (Chūgoku region)
  - Hiroshima District Court (広島地方裁判所), Yamaguchi (山口)
    - Okayama (岡山)
    - Matsue (松江, in Shimane), Tottori (鳥取)
- Fukuoka High Court (Kyūshū)
  - Fukuoka District Court (福岡地方裁判所), Saga (佐賀), Nagasaki (長崎), Ōita (大分)
    - Miyazaki (宮崎), Kumamoto (熊本), Kagoshima (鹿児島)
    - Naha (那覇, in Okinawa)
- Sendai High Court (Tōhoku region)
  - Sendai District Court (仙台地方裁判所), Fukushima (福島), Morioka (盛岡, in Iwate)
    - Akita (秋田), Yamagata (山形), Aomori (青森)
- Sapporo High Court (Hokkaido)
  - Sapporo District Court (札幌地方裁判所), Hakodate (函館), Asahikawa (旭川), Kushiro (釧路)
- Takamatsu High Court (Shikoku)
  - Takamatsu District Court (高松地方裁判所, in Kagawa), Tokushima (徳島), Kōchi (高知), Matsuyama (松山, in Ehime)

At the apex of the judicial hierarchy is the Supreme Court (最高裁判所 Saikō saibansho), located adjacent to the National Diet Building in the Nagatachō district of Chiyoda, Tokyo. The "Grand Bench" (大法廷 Daihōtei) of the Supreme Court has associate justices, who are appointed by the Cabinet with the Emperor's attestation. The Chief Justice is nominated by the Cabinet and appointed to office by the Emperor. The Grand Bench is subdivided into three "Petty Benches" (小法廷 Shōhōtei) of five justices each, who hear incoming appeals and recommend them for an audience before the Grand Bench. An appeal to the Supreme Court is called jōkoku (上告), and requires either an error in the interpretation of the Constitution, or an error in the interpretation of case law from the Supreme Court or a high court.

In addition to these strata, there is also a Family Court (家庭裁判所 Katei saibansho) tied to each District Court, as well as in over 200 branch offices throughout the country. Family Courts primarily deal with juvenile delinquency cases and divorce, although they have a broad jurisdiction that encompasses all forms of domestic disputes, including correcting koseki registration data and partitioning estates. If a settlement cannot be reached between the parties, the case is transferred to the District Court.

Although juries have not been used in Japan since 1943, a new quasi-jury system was passed into law in May 2004 and was implemented in 2009. They are not juries but "lay judges" (裁判員 saiban-in) working side by side with the "professional judges". Typically, there are six lay judges and three professional judges for one case. The decision has to be by majority and include at least one of the professional judges. Such saiban-in trials are only used in serious cases, such as those punishable by death penalty or life imprisonment, and cases that caused a victim to die. This is provided in the Act on Criminal Trials with the Participation of Saiban-in.

== See also ==
- Japanese law
- Public order and internal security in Japan
- Criminal justice system of Japan
- Supreme Court of Japan
- List of justices of the Supreme Court of Japan
- Juries in Japan
- Attorney at law (Japan)
