= Seisaku Nakamura =

Japanese serial killer

- 中村 誠策
- Born: Seisaku Nakamura; September 10, 1923; Shizuoka, Empire of Japan
- Died: July 24, 1944 (aged 20); Empire of Japan
- Cause of death: Execution by hanging
- Other name: Hamamatsu Deaf Killer
- Conviction: Murder
- Penalty: Death

Details
- Victims: 9–11
- Span of crimes: August 22, 1938 – August 30, 1942
- Country: Japan
- State: Shizuoka
- Date apprehended: October 12, 1942

Seisaku Nakamura (中村 誠策, Nakamura Seisaku; September 10, 1923 – July 24, 1944) was a Japanese man convicted for serial killings in his teenage years. He is also known as Hamamatsu Deaf Killer. He was convicted of stabbing at least nine people to death, including several teenagers, in the Shizuoka Prefecture. The book, Senzen no Shōnen Hanzai (戦前の少年犯罪), which included the subject of the incident, was published in October 2007.

== Early life ==
Seisaku Nakamura was born deaf. He was intelligent, achieving high marks at school, but was treated poorly by his family and was a social misfit. He enjoyed films where men used Japanese swords to assassinate people.

== Murders ==
According to his testimony, on August 22, 1938, he attempted to rape two women; they resisted him, so he murdered them. He was 14 years old at that time. However, the two murders are often excluded from his serial murders.

On August 18, 1941, at the age of 17, Nakamura killed a third woman and injured a fourth. On August 20, 1941, three more people were found dead, murdered by Nakamura. On September 27, 1941, he murdered his brother, and injured his father, his sister, his sister-in-law and his niece. On August 30, 1942, he murdered a couple, their daughter, and their son, and attempted to rape another daughter.

Information about his crimes were restricted because many thought news about his crimes would cause excessive trouble during the already tense war time, so Nakamura went unapprehended for longer than he might have otherwise. His family knew that he was responsible for the deaths but were afraid of revenge and did not come forward.

== Arrest, trial, and execution ==
Nakamura was arrested for nine murders on October 12, 1942. He also admitted two others. On November 11, his father Fumisada Nakamura (中村 文貞, Nakamura Fumisada) committed suicide. He was tried as an adult under the Wartime Law (戦時刑事特別法, Senji Keiji Tokubetsu Hō). The doctors claimed that he was not guilty by reason of insanity. However, the trial proceeded rapidly. Nakamura was found guilty and sentenced to death in February 1944. He was executed by hanging on July 24, 1944.

The book, Senzen no Shōnen Hanzai (戦前の少年犯罪; "Youth Crime in Prewar Japan") discussed the incident. It was published in October 2007.

== See also ==
- List of serial killers by country
- List of serial killers by number of victims
