= Civil liberties =

Civil rights and freedoms that provide individual specific rights

Civil liberties are fundamental rights and freedoms that governments pledge not to restrict, either through constitutions, legislation, or judicial interpretation, without due process of law. Although the scope of civil liberties differs between countries, they often include the freedom of conscience, freedom of the press, freedom of religion, freedom of expression, freedom of assembly, personal security, personal liberty, freedom of speech, right to privacy, equality before the law, due process of law, the right to a fair trial, and the right to life. Other civil liberties include the right to own property, the right to defend oneself, and the right to bodily integrity. Within the distinctions between civil liberties and other types of liberty, distinctions exist between positive liberty/positive rights and negative liberty/negative rights.

Libertarians advocate for the negative liberty aspect of civil liberties, emphasizing minimal government intervention in both personal and economic affairs. Influential advocates of this interpretation include John Stuart Mill, whose work On Liberty argues for the protection of individual freedoms from government encroachment, and Friedrich Hayek, whose The Road to Serfdom warns against the dangers of expanding state power. Ayn Rand's Atlas Shrugged and Ron Paul's The Revolution: A Manifesto further emphasize the importance of safeguarding personal autonomy and limiting government authority. These contributions have played a significant role in shaping the discourse on civil liberties and the appropriate scope of government.

== Overview ==
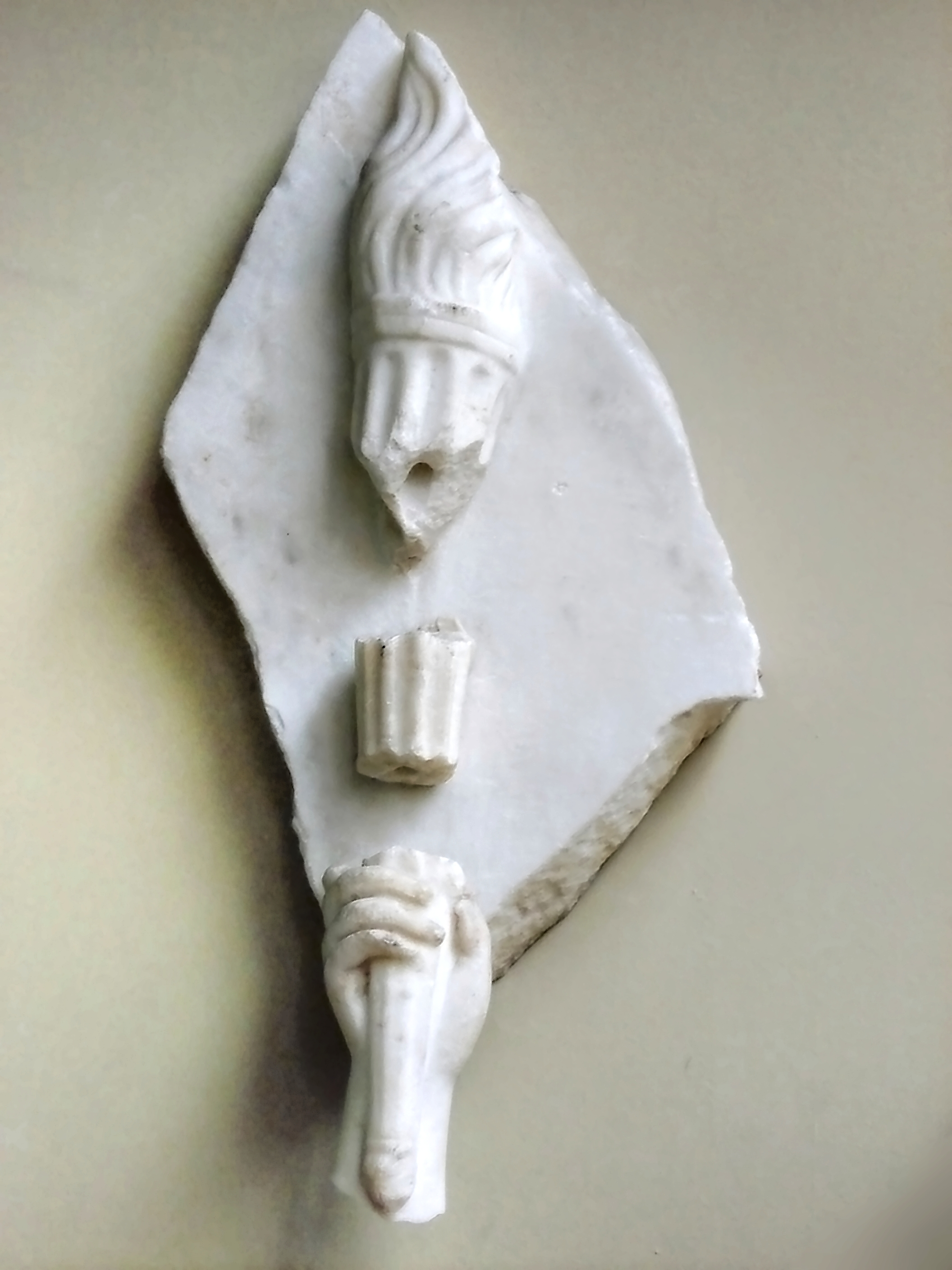
Broken Liberty: Istanbul Archaeology Museum

Many contemporary nations have a constitution, a bill of rights, or similar constitutional documents that enumerate and seek to guarantee civil liberties. Other nations have enacted similar laws through a variety of legal means, including signing and ratifying or otherwise giving effect to key conventions such as the European Convention on Human Rights and the International Covenant on Civil and Political Rights. The existence of some claimed civil liberties is a matter of dispute, as are the extent of most civil rights. Controversial examples include property rights, reproductive rights, and civil marriage. In authoritarian regimes in which government censorship impedes on perceived civil liberties, some civil liberty advocates argue for the use of anonymity tools to allow for free speech, privacy, and anonymity. The degree to which societies acknowledge civil liberties is affected by the influence of terrorism and war. Whether the existence of victimless crimes infringes upon civil liberties is also a matter of dispute. Another matter of debate is the suspension or alteration of certain civil liberties in times of war or state of emergency, including whether and to what extent this should occur.

The formal concept of civil liberties is often dated back to Magna Carta, an English legal charter agreed in 1215 which in turn was based on pre-existing documents, namely the Charter of Liberties.

== Asia ==
=== China ===
The Constitution of China especially its Fundamental Rights and Duties of Citizens, claims to protect many civil liberties. Taiwan, which is separated from mainland China, has its own Constitution.

Although the 1982 constitution guarantees civil liberties, the Chinese government usually uses the "subversion of state power" and "protection of state secrets" clauses in their law system to imprison those who criticize the Chinese Communist Party (CCP) and the state leaders.

=== India ===
The Fundamental Rights – embodied in Part III of the constitution – guarantee liberties such that all Indians can lead their lives in peace as citizens of India. The six fundamental rights are right to equality, right to freedom, right against exploitation, right to freedom of religion, cultural and educational rights and the right to constitutional remedies.

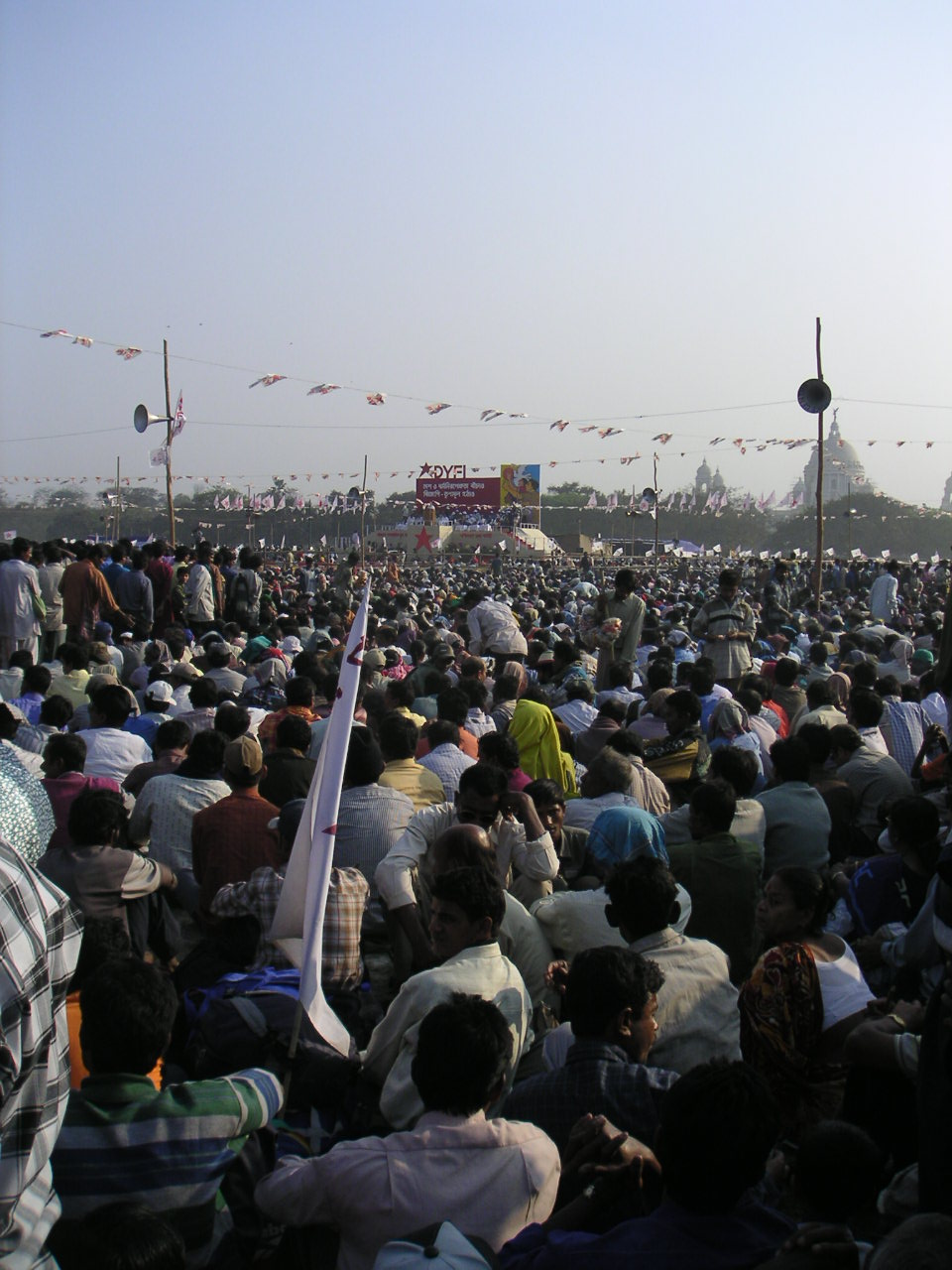
Huge rallies like this one in Kolkata are commonplace in India.

These include individual rights common to most liberal democracies, incorporated in the fundamental law of the land and are enforceable in a court of law. Violations of these rights result in punishments as prescribed in the Indian Penal Code, subject to the discretion of the judiciary. These rights are neither absolute nor immune from constitutional amendments. They have been aimed at overturning the inequalities of pre-independence social practices. Specifically, they resulted in the abolishment of untouchability and prohibited discrimination on the grounds of religion, race, caste, sex, or place of birth. They forbid human trafficking and unfree labour. They protect the cultural and educational rights of ethnic and religious minorities by allowing them to preserve their languages and administer their own educational institutions.

All people, irrespective of race, religion, caste or sex, have the right to approach the High Courts or the Supreme Court for the enforcement of their fundamental rights. It is not necessary that the aggrieved party has to be the one to do so. In the public interest, anyone can initiate litigation in the court on their behalf. This is known as "public interest litigation". High Court and Supreme Court judges can also act on their own on the basis of media reports.

The Fundamental Rights emphasize equality by guaranteeing all citizens access to and use of public institutions and protections, irrespective of their background. The rights to life and personal liberty apply to persons of any nationality, while others, such as the freedom of speech and expression apply only to the citizens of India (including non-resident Indian citizens). The right to equality in matters of public employment cannot be conferred to overseas citizens of India.

Fundamental Rights primarily protect individuals from any arbitrary State actions, but some rights are enforceable against private individuals too. For instance, the constitution abolishes untouchability and prohibits begar. These provisions act as a check both on State actions and the actions of private individuals. Fundamental Rights are not absolute and are subject to reasonable restrictions as necessary for the protection of national interest. In the Kesavananda Bharati vs. State of Kerala case, the Supreme Court ruled that all provisions of the constitution, including Fundamental Rights can be amended. However, the Parliament cannot alter the basic structure of the constitution like secularism, democracy, federalism, and separation of powers. Often called the "Basic structure doctrine", this decision is widely regarded as an important part of Indian history. In the 1978 Maneka Gandhi v. Union of India case, the Supreme Court extended the doctrine's importance as superior to any parliamentary legislation. According to the verdict, no act of parliament can be considered a law if it violates the basic structure of the constitution. This landmark guarantee of Fundamental Rights was regarded as a unique example of judicial independence in preserving the sanctity of Fundamental Rights. The Fundamental Rights can only be altered by a constitutional amendment, hence their inclusion is a check not only on the executive branch but also on the Parliament and state legislatures. The imposition of a state of emergency may lead to a temporary suspension of the rights conferred by Article 19 (including freedoms of speech, assembly and movement, etc.) to preserve national security and public order. The President can, by order, suspend the constitutional written remedies as well.

=== Japan ===
Since 1947, Japan, a country with a constitutional monarchy and known for its socially "conservative society where change is gradual," has a constitution with a seemingly strong bill of rights at its core (Chapter III. Rights and Duties of the People). In many ways, it resembles the U.S. Constitution prior to the Civil Rights Act of 1964, and that is because it came into life during the Allied occupation of Japan. This constitution may have felt like a foreign imposition to the governing elites, but not to the ordinary people "who lacked faith in their discredited leaders and supported meaningful change." In the abstract, the constitution strives to secure fundamental individual liberties and rights, which are covered pointedly in articles 10 to 40. Most salient of the human dignity articles is article 25, section 1, which guarantees that all "People shall have the right to maintain the minimum standards of wholesome and cultured living."

Despite the adoption of this liberal constitution, often referred as the "Postwar Constitution" (戦後憲法, Sengo-Kenpō) or the "Peace Constitution" (平和憲法, Heiwa-Kenpō), the Japanese governing elites have struggled to usher in an inclusive, open and Pluralist society. Even after the end of World War II and the departure of the Allied government of occupation in 1952, Japan has been the target of international criticism for failing to admit to war crimes, institutional religious discrimination and maintaining a weak freedom of the press, the treatment of children, minorities, foreigners, and women, its punitive criminal justice system, and more recently, the systematic bias against LGBT people.

The first Japanese attempt to a bill of rights was in the 19th century Meiji constitution (1890), which took both the Prussian (1850) and British constitutions as basic models. However, it had but a meagre influence in the practice of the rule of law as well as in people's daily lives. So, the short and deliberately gradual history of struggles for personal rights and protection against government/society's impositions has yet to transform Japan into a champion of universal and individual freedom. According to constitutional scholar, Shigenori Matsui,

People tend to view the Bill of Rights as a moral imperative and not as a judicial norm. The people also tend to rely upon bureaucrats to remedy social problems, including even human rights violations, rather than the court.

— Shigenori Matsui, "The protection of 'Fundamental human rights' in Japan."

Despite the divergences between Japan's social culture and the Liberal Constitutionalism that it purports to have adopted, the country has moved toward closing the gap between the notion and the practice of the law. The trend is more evident in the long term. Among several examples, the Diet (bicameral legislature) ratified the International Bill of Human Rights in 1979 and then it passed the Law for Equal Opportunity in Employment for Men and Women in 1985, measures that were heralded as major steps toward a democratic and participatory society. In 2015, moreover, it reached an agreement with Korea to compensate for abuses related to the so-called "women of comfort" that took place during the Japanese occupation of the peninsula. However, human rights group, and families of the survivors condemned the agreement as patronizing and insulting.

On its official site, the Japanese government has identified various human rights problems. Among these are child abuses (e.g., bullying, corporal punishment, child sexual abuse, child prostitution, and child pornography), frequent neglect and ill-treatment of elderly persons and individuals with disabilities, Dowa claims (discrimination against the Burakumin), Ainu people (indigenous people in Japan), foreign nationals, HIV/AIDS carriers, Hansen's disease patients, persons released from prison after serving their sentence, crime victims, people whose human rights are violated using the Internet, the homeless, individuals with gender identity disorders, and women. Also, the government lists systematic problems with gender biases and the standard reference to sexual preferences for jobs and other functions in society.

Human rights organizations, national and foreign, expand the list to include human rights violations that relate to government policies, as in the case of daiyo kangoku system (substitute prison) and the methods of interrogating crime suspects. The effort of these agencies and ordinary people seem to pay off. In 2016, the U.S. Department of State released a report stating that Japan's human right record is showing signs of improvement.

== Australia ==
Whilst Australia does not have an enshrined Bill of Rights or similar binding legal document, civil liberties are assumed as protected through a series of rules and conventions. Australia had primary involvement in and was a key signatory to the UN Universal Declaration on Human Rights (1948)

The Constitution of Australia (1900) does offer very limited protection of rights:

- the right to freedom of religion and;
- the right to freedom from discrimination based on out-of-state residence (historical prejudice based upon residence within one state affecting treatment within another)

Certain High Court interpretations of the Constitution have allowed for implied rights such as freedom of political communication (which is construed broadly) and the right to vote to be established, however, others such as freedom of assembly and freedom of association are yet to be identified.

Refugee issues

Within the past decade, Australia has experienced increasing contention regarding its treatment of those seeking asylum. Although Australia is a signatory to the UN Refugee Convention (1951), successive governments have demonstrated an increasing tightening of borders; particularly against those who seek passage via small water vessels.

The Abbott Government (2013) like its predecessors (the Gillard and Howard Governments) has encountered particular difficulty curbing asylum seekers via sea, increasingly identified as "illegal immigration". The recent involvement of the Australian Navy in refugee rescue operations has many human rights groups such as Amnesty International concerned over the "militarisation" of the treatment of refugees and the issue of their human rights in Australia. The current "turn-back" policy is particularly divisive, as it involves placing refugees in government lifeboats and turning them towards Indonesia. Despite opposition however, the Abbott government's response has so far seen a reduction in the number of potential refugees undertaking the hazardous cross to Australia, which is argued by the government as an indicator of its policy success.

== Europe ==
=== European Convention on Human Rights ===
The European Convention on Human Rights, to which almost all European countries belong (apart from Belarus), enumerates a number of civil liberties and is of varying constitutional force in different European states.

=== Czech Republic ===
Following the Velvet Revolution, a constitutional overhaul took place in Czechoslovakia. In 1991, the Charter of Fundamental Rights and Basic Freedoms was adopted, having the same legal standing as the Constitution. The Czech Republic has kept the Charter in its entirety following the dissolution of Czechoslovakia as Act No. 2/1993 Coll. (Constitution being No. 1).

=== France ===
France's 1789 Declaration of the Rights of Man and of the Citizen listed many civil liberties and is of constitutional force.

=== Germany ===
The German constitution, the "Grundgesetz" (lit. "Base Law"), starts with an elaborate listing of civil liberties and states in sec. 1 "The dignity of man is inviolable. To respect and protect it shall be the duty of all public authority." Following the "Austrian System", the people have the right to appeal to the Federal Constitutional Court of Germany ("Bundesverfassungsgericht") if they feel their civil rights are being violated. This procedure has shaped German law considerably over the years.

=== United Kingdom ===
Civil liberties in the United Kingdom date back to Magna Carta in 1215 and 17th century English common law and statute law, such as the 1628 Petition of Right, the Habeas Corpus Act 1679 and the Bill of Rights 1689. Parts of these laws remain in statute today and are supplemented by other legislation and conventions that collectively form the uncodified constitution of the United Kingdom. In addition, the United Kingdom is a signatory to the European Convention on Human Rights which covers both human rights and civil liberties. The Human Rights Act 1998 incorporates the great majority of Convention rights directly into UK law.

In June 2008 the then Shadow Home Secretary David Davis resigned his parliamentary seat over what he described as the "erosion of civil liberties" by the then Labour government, and was re-elected on a civil liberties platform (although he was not opposed by candidates of other major parties). This was in reference to anti-terrorism laws and in particular the extension to pre-trial detention, that is perceived by many to be an infringement of habeas corpus established in Magna Carta.

=== Russia ===
The Constitution of the Russian Federation guarantees in theory many of the same rights and civil liberties as the U.S. except to bear arms, i.e.: freedom of speech, freedom of religion, freedom of association and assembly, freedom to choose language, to due process, to a fair trial, privacy, freedom to vote, right for education, etc. However, human rights groups like Amnesty International have warned that Vladimir Putin has seriously curtailed freedom of expression, freedom of assembly and freedom of association amidst growing authoritarianism.

== North America ==
=== Canada ===
The Constitution of Canada includes the Canadian Charter of Rights and Freedoms which guarantees many of the same rights as the U.S. Constitution. The Charter omits any mention of, or protection for, property.

=== Mexico ===
The Constitution of Mexico was ratified on February 5, 1917. Similar to the U.S. Constitution, the United Mexican States provides all citizens the right to freedom of expression, but this right is not absolute (for example, child pornography, death threats, and defamation are exceptions to freedom of speech, and offenders can be subject to penalties). However, unlike the United States and Canada, Mexico has stricter limits on citizenship. For example, only people born in Mexico may take roles in law enforcement, legislating, or enlist in the armed forces. It also states each person born in Mexico cannot be deprived of their citizenship status.

=== United States ===
The United States Constitution, especially its Bill of Rights, protects civil liberties. The passage of the Fourteenth Amendment further protected civil liberties by introducing the Privileges or Immunities Clause, Due Process Clause, and Equal Protection Clause. Human rights within the United States are often called civil rights, which are those rights, privileges, and immunities held by all people, in distinction to political rights, which are the rights that inhere to those who are entitled to participate in elections, as candidates or voters. Before universal suffrage, this distinction was important, since many people were ineligible to vote but still were considered to have the fundamental freedoms derived from the rights to life, liberty and the pursuit of happiness. This distinction is less important now that Americans enjoy near universal suffrage, and civil rights are now taken to include the political rights to vote and participate in elections, being furthermore classified with civil liberties in general as either positive rights or negative rights. Because Native American tribal governments retain sovereignty over tribal members, the U.S. Congress in 1968 enacted a law that essentially applies most of the protections of the Bill of Rights to tribal members, to be enforced mainly by tribal courts.

The Civil Liberties Act of 1988 was signed into effect by President Ronald Reagan on August 10, 1988. The act was passed by Congress to issue a public apology for those of Japanese ancestry who lost their property and liberty due to discriminatory actions by the United States Government during the internment period. This act also provided many other benefits within various sectors of the government. Within the treasury, it established a civil liberties public education fund. It directed the Attorney General to identify and locate each individual affected by this act and to pay them $20,000 from the Civil Liberties public education fund. It also established a board of directors who is responsible for making disbursements from this fund. Finally, it required that all documents and records that are created or received by the commission be kept by the Archivist of the United States.

== See also ==
- American Civil Liberties Union
- Canadian Civil Liberties Association
- Civil and political rights
- Civil awareness
- Civil libertarianism
- Drug liberalization
- Equality and Human Rights Commission
- Fundamental freedoms
- Human rights
- Libertarianism
- Liberty (pressure group)
- List of civil rights leaders
- Privacy
- Proactive policing
- Rule according to higher law
- Rutherford Institute
- State of World Liberty Index
- Statewatch
- Teaching for social justice
