= Hostage justice =

Japanese phrase criticizing the judiciary

Hostage justice (Japanese: 人質司法, Hitojichi shihō) is a Japanese-language phrase used in criticizing the Japanese judiciary. It refers to the period during which a defendant is held while denying an accusation, which is long compared with cases in which a defendant does not deny an accusation in Japanese criminal action procedure. Hostage justice is a system used by police and prosecutors to obtain confessions, regardless of whether the suspect is guilty or not guilty of a crime. Suspects can be held indefinitely under interrogation without charges. False confessions are common under these conditions, which leads to wrongful convictions for the falsely accused. Convictions can include life imprisonment and death.

The Asian Journal of Criminology (2022) describes 4 main problems in Japan's justice system that systematically mistreat criminal suspects. First being criminal "duty to receive interrogation (Japanese: torishirabe o junin gimu). Here, criminal suspects have the right to remain silent (mokuhiken) yet they are still obligated to endure interrogation- despite its methods. According to study by Takashi Takano, criminal interrogation embodying the practice of high frequency, protracted or undesired acts create the fundamental problem with Hostage Justice as it results in long and unpleasant interrogation against the will of the criminal suspect. Second being restriction between suspect and individual who is not a defense lawyer. Third, police are often given the power to place suspects in detention for “dubious and pretextual purposes”. Fourth being having a “substitute imprisonment” (daiyo kangoku) system where prosecutors often detain suspects in police holding cells (ryuchijo) instead of official detention centers (kochisho)). This makes police interrogation more accessible yet it is also known as the “hotbed of false confessions”. All problems point to similar outcomes where criminal suspects give involuntary testimony-affirmation of charges, against their will.

== Cases ==
=== Ohkawara Kakohki case ===
The Japan Times reported the case of Masaaki Okawara, the president of Ohkawara Kakohki, who was accused along with others of illegally exporting spray dryers. In March 2020, Okawara, Junji Shimada, and Shizuo Aishima were arrested despite having demonstrated the safety of their products to the police. During their detention, they exercised their right to remain silent and consequently faced harsh treatment by prosecutors.

Aishima's bail requests were denied numerous times on the basis of potential conspiracy with other employees. This led to his medical needs being neglected; he died of stomach cancer in February 2021. Meanwhile, Okawara and Shimada were held in detention for 332 days. In February 2021, their bail requests were finally approved. Due to a lack of evidence, charges were dropped before the start of the trial in August 2021. Okawara described his treatment, stating, "I was treated as if I was a slave. With days like these that drained me physically and mentally, I sometimes wondered if it might have been a good idea to admit guilt in order to get out early."

In December 2023, the Tokyo District Court ruled that the arrests of Okawara, Shimada, and Aishima were unlawful and the indictments against them illegal. The court ordered the Tokyo Metropolitan Government and the Japanese government to pay approximately 160 million yen (US$1.1 million) in compensation. In June 2025, senior officials from the Tokyo District Public Prosecutors Office and the Tokyo Metropolitan Police Department formally apologized to Okawara and Shimada.

=== Carlos Ghosn ===
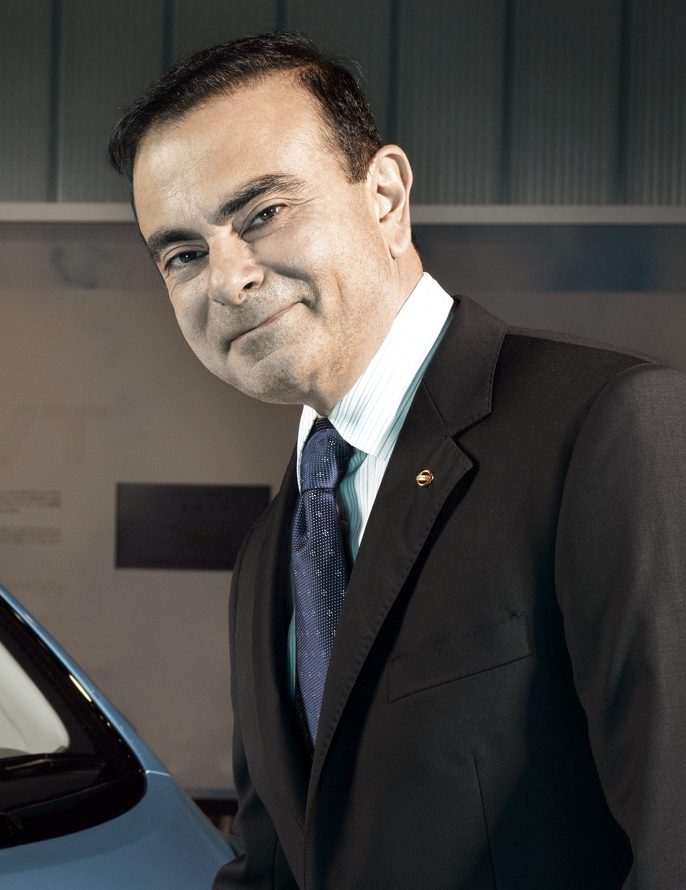
Carlos Ghosn

BBC reported on the case of Carlos Ghosn, the former chairman of Nissan who was arrested for understating his annual salary and misusing company funds in November 2018. Upon his denial, he fled to Japan and was immediately arrested at the Tokyo airport. He was transported to the Tokyo Detention Centre where he was given prison clothes and confined to a cell. Ghosn was also restricted from having any contact with his wife, Carole Ghosn. She told The Guardian in 2019 that “for hours each day, the prosecutors interrogate him, browbeat him, lecture him and berated him, outside the presence of his attorney, in an effort to extract a confession.” Le Figaro reported that Carlos Ghosn's French lawyers described his continued Japanese detention in a complaint filed with the UNHCR as "hostage justice". CNN quoted Jeff Kingston, director of Asian studies at Temple University's Japan campus, stating "That system of hostage justice, I think, does not bear scrutiny."

=== Tsuguhiro Kadokawa ===
In 2022, Tsuguhiro Kadokawa, the former chair of Kadokawa Corporation, was arrested and indicted over bribery allegations linked to Tokyo Olympics 2020. He was detained for more than seven months, and during his detention he was repeatedly told by prosecutors that he would not be released from imprisonment until he confessed according to their storyline. In June 2024, he filed a civil lawsuit against the Japanese government for illegal detention and interrogation, and planned to file a complaint with the UN Human Rights Committee (UNHRC). His lawyer argued that their hostage-justice-type actions were in violation of international laws of human rights.

== Lawsuit to end hostage justice ==
On March 24, 2025, four men who experienced hostage justice filed a civil lawsuit at the Tokyo District Court. Each man seeks compensation of 1.1 million yen, and they contend that the Code of Criminal Procedure provisions allowing prolonged pretrial detention and denial of bail violate the Japanese Constitution. This lawsuit is notable for being the first one of its kind, in that multiple victims are plaintiffs and directly challenge the unconstitutionality of the provisions that form the basis of the hostage justice system.

== See also ==
- Daiyō kangoku
