= Genzo Kurita =

Japanese serial killer

- Born: Genzo Kurita; November 3, 1926; Ogachi District, Akita, Empire of Japan
- Died: October 14, 1959 (aged 32); Miyagi Prison, Sendai, Japan
- Other name: "The Second Kodaira"
- Status: Executed by hanging
- Conviction: Murder (7 counts)
- Penalty: Death

Details
- Victims: 7 convicted 17 confessed
- Span of crimes: 1945 (claimed) or February 1948 – January 13, 1952
- Country: Japan
- States: Chiba, Tochigi, Shizuoka; possibly others
- Date apprehended: January 16, 1952

Genzo Kurita (Japanese: 栗田 源蔵, Hepburn: Kurita Genzō; November 3, 1926 – October 14, 1959) was a Japanese serial killer, necrophile and rapist who murdered at least seven people.

== Murders ==
Kurita murdered two girlfriends in February 1948. On August 8, 1951, he raped and murdered a 24-year-old woman beside her baby. He then had sex with her corpse.

On October 11, 1951, he raped and murdered a 29-year-old woman. He threw her three children from a cliff called Osen Korogashi. One survived.

Kurita killed a 63-year-old woman and her 24-year-old niece on January 13, 1952. Afterward, he had sex with the niece's dead body. At the crime scene, the police found his fingerprints.

== Arrest, trial, and execution ==
Kurita was arrested on January 16, 1952.

On August 12, 1952, the district court in Chiba sentenced him to death for the last two murders. The district court in Utsunomiya sentenced him to death for five others on December 21, 1953. but was acquitted of killing one girlfriend. Kurita himself has confessed to killing one person in Matsushima, Sendai, Miyagi, four in Hokkaido, one in Owani Hot Spring, Aomori, and three others elsewhere in 1945 to 1951, but he has not been convicted for these crimes. He appealed the sentences, but because of mental instability he retracted his appeals on October 21, 1954. He was considered to be neurotic and a danger to himself, committing self-harm but also screaming that he did not want to die. He was executed on October 14, 1959. He was reported for an unknown grave, or disclosed location.

== Aftermath ==
On May 10, 1956, a pro-death penalty prosecutor in Supreme Public Prosecutors Office introduced Kurita into a debate about capital punishment in the Diet.

== See also ==
- Yoshio Kodaira
- Capital punishment debate
- List of serial killers by country
