= Daiyō kangoku =

Detention cells in Japan

Daiyō kangoku (代用監獄) is a Japanese legal term meaning "substitute prison". Daiyō kangoku are detention cells found in police stations which are used as legal substitutes for detention centers, or prisons. The practical difference lies in the supervision of daiyō kangoku by the police forces responsible for investigations, whereas detention centers are supervised by a professional corps of prison guards who are not involved in the investigative processes.

Daiyō kangoku came about to solve a shortage of prison cells in Japan in 1908. The practice has continued and has significant political support. It has been controversial, however, because of its role in eliciting confessions from criminal suspects, especially foreigners who do not have access to translators or lawyers.

== Controversy ==
Suspects can be detained for an "interview" in a daiyō kangoku for as many as seventy-two hours under the Code of Criminal Procedure. After this seventy-two-hour period, prosecutors can request a further ten days' detention of the suspect from a judge. These ten days are frequently used by the investigative authorities to gain confessions from the suspect. After the initial ten-day extension, the prosecutor can request a further ten days of detention from a judge, before the suspect must either be charged or released. Activists claim that requests for pre-trial detention after arrest are almost always granted by judges; in 1987, the rate of approval for all requests was 99.8% and that same year, 85% of arrested detainees were kept in daiyō kangoku facilities for longer than seventy-two hours; more than a third of suspects were held without charge for longer than ten days by a judge's decision to extend the time limits. Activists also claim that authorities have a great deal of control over the suspect's well-being, and can restrict meals or access to family and that intensive interrogation practices are often used, and the condition of daiyō kangoku are considered worse than those in Japanese regular detention centers. Japanese human rights and civil liberties activists in Japan have questioned whether this policy, which in sum allows 23 days of detention before charges must be brought, adequately protects suspects' rights. In practice, the detention may be indeterminate: the 23 days period can be repeated over and over by filing more charges.

Defenders of the current system argue that under generally conservative prefectural policies, extraordinary proof must be obtained before an arrest can be made. Japanese prosecutors require beyond-reasonable-doubt proof for indictments, and often require a confession. Advocates of the daiyō kangoku system argue that this culture of restraint among the authorities merits and even requires the ability to place uncharged suspects in prolonged detention. During an interview in the daiyō kangoku, the suspect has the rights, under the Constitution, to counsel and to remain silent. Under the Japanese Supreme Court's interpretation of the Code of Criminal Procedure, suspects cannot end the interview—which is to say, the suspect cannot choose to leave the daiyō kangoku until the interview is concluded. Japanese human rights and civil liberties advocates usually criticize this interpretation as offering the accused too few rights in daiyō kangoku.

== See also ==
- Black Jails (Illegal extralegal detention centers in China)
- Hitojichi shihō (hostage justice system)

== Other references ==
- Oda, Hiroshi (1999). Japanese Law. Oxford: Oxford University Press: 423–424.
