= Tokyo High Court =

Japanese court of law

Coordinates: 35.675°N 139.753°E

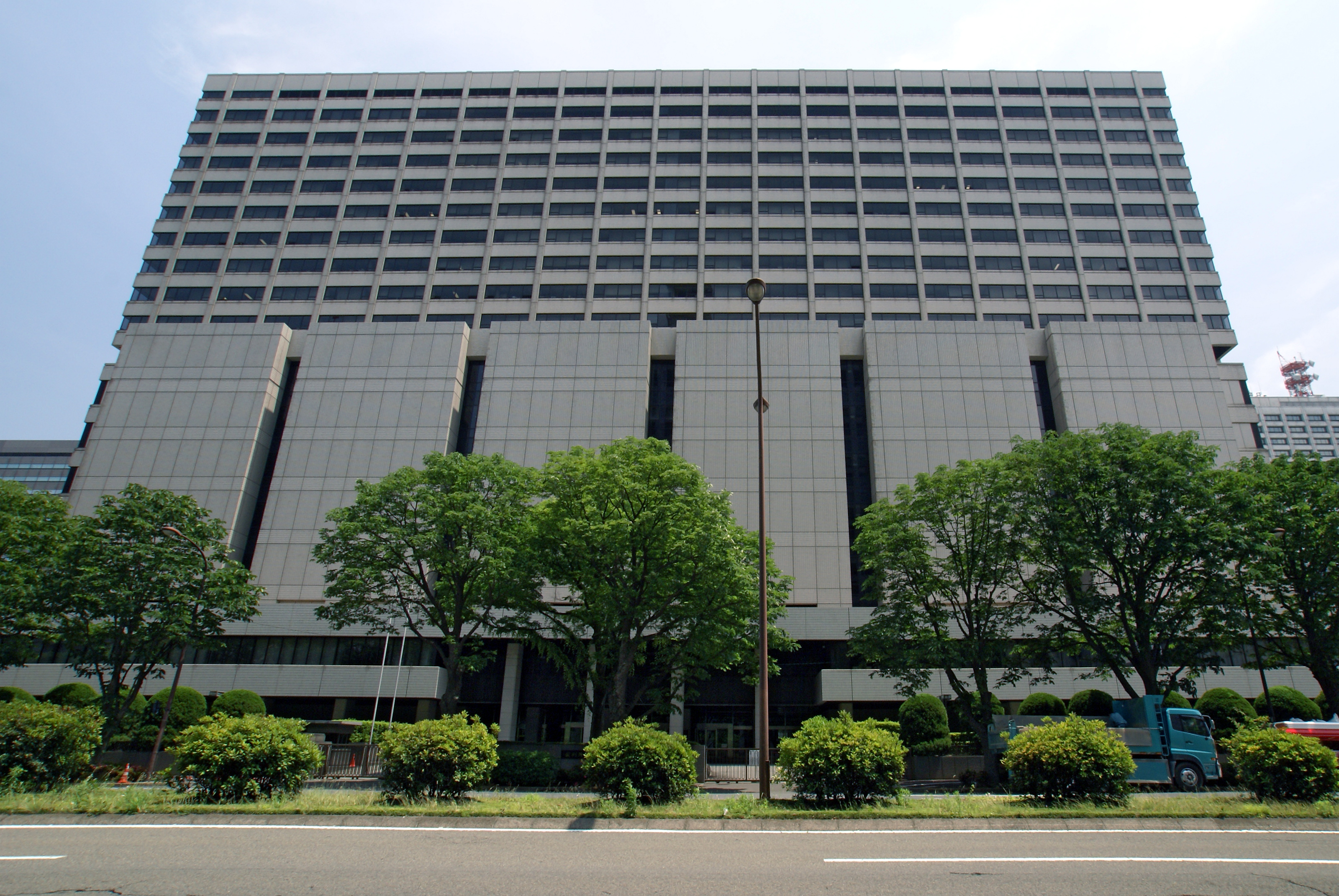
Tokyo High Court

Tokyo High Court (東京高等裁判所, Tōkyō Kōtō Saibansho) is a high court in Kasumigaseki, Chiyoda, Tokyo, Japan. The Intellectual Property High Court (知的財産高等裁判所, Chiteki-zaisan-kōtō-saiban-sho) is a special branch of Tokyo High Court. Japan has eight high courts: Tokyo, Osaka, Nagoya, Hiroshima, Fukuoka, Sendai, Sapporo, and Takamatsu. Each court has jurisdiction over one of eight territories in the country. Each has a president and several high court judges. Typically three judges will sit to hear a case, though in some cases - such as ones related to insurrection - five judges will sit.

== Jurisdiction ==
The High Court has the jurisdiction to hear appeals to judgments rendered by district courts in the first instance and family courts. This excludes cases under the jurisdiction of the Supreme Court. Appeals to criminal cases go directly to high courts, but civil case appeals are first handled by district courts.

The Tokyo High Court has exclusive original jurisdiction over cases that involve quasi-judicial agencies, including the ability to rescind decisions in cases made by such agencies.

== Intellectual Property Court ==
The Intellectual Property Court is a special branch of the Tokyo High Court. Established in April 2005, it handles only cases related to intellectual property. This includes appeals to civil cases relating to patent rights from district courts and trial decisions made by the Japan Patent Office.

== See also ==
- Judicial system of Japan
