= Yoshio Kodaira =

Japanese serial killer and rapist

- Kodaira (in the conical straw hat) being escorted into court during his trial (1947)
- Born: 28 January 1905; Tochigi, Tochigi Prefecture, Empire of Japan
- Died: 5 October 1949 (aged 44); Miyagi Prison, Sendai, Occupied Japan
- Spouse(s): Unnamed first wife (m. 1932; div. 1942/1943); Unnamed second wife (m. 1944)
- Children: At least 3 (2 illegitimate)
- Status: Executed by hanging
- Convictions: First murder: Murder (1 count); Serial murders: Murder (8 counts); Rape (40 counts)
- Penalty: First murder: 15 years imprisonment (paroled after 8 years); Serial murders: Death

Details
- Victims: 9–12+ killed (including at least 1+ in China); 6 injured; 40+ raped
- Span of crimes: 2 July 1932 – 6 August 1946 (confessed to at least one additional murder in China in the 1920s)
- Country: Japan and China
- States: Tochigi, Tokyo, Binhai
- Date apprehended: 20 August 1946

Yoshio Kodaira (小平 義雄, Kodaira Yoshio; 28 January 1905 – 5 October 1949) was a Japanese serial killer, war criminal and serial rapist who murdered at least 8 people in the Tokyo and Tochigi Prefecture areas between 1932 and 1946.

Kodaira killed his father-in-law in 1932 and later raped and murdered at least 7 women between 1945 and 1946 by inviting them into forested areas around Tochigi and Tokyo under the guise of giving them food or employment. Kodaira was sentenced to death after being convicted of killing the seven women and executed in 1949. Kodaira is suspected to have killed other people in Japan, and confessed to committing war crimes in China in the 1920s. However, the exact number of his victims is unknown.

== Early life ==
Yoshio Kodaira was born on 28 January 1905 in Tochigi, Tochigi Prefecture to a family of eight as the sixth child and third son, and suffered from stuttering during his childhood. Kodaira's family ran a merchant's inn. However, Kodaira's father suffered from an addiction to drinking, gambling, and spending, which led to the business going bankrupt, forcing them to live in poverty. His paternal family had a history of mental illness, and all five of his father's siblings suffered from mental illness.

During elementary school, his grades were poor and he was ranked 21st out of 23 students. He also consistently displayed poor behavior; Kodaira's first grade evaluation read "there is no day without a fight" and he was noted as "rude and violent" in his sixth grade evaluation. He was variously described as "careless," "unenthusiastic," "lazy," and "dull." It was also reported that Kodaira would easily become angry when he was unable to communicate his intentions to others. As an adolescent, Kodaira would bully those weaker than him but was reportedly kind to girls.

In 1923, at the age of 18, Kodaira joined the Imperial Japanese Navy and was assigned to a marine regiment stationed in Yokosuka. Early in his military career, he bought the services of prostitutes in Yokosuka, and later on indulged in the same behavior in Australia and Europe during port calls as a crew member of a warship. According to Kodaira, he sometimes stayed the night with a woman and had sex with her four or five times. His second wife later remarked how he would demand sex from her almost every night, sometimes twice in one night, despite nearing 40 years of age. However, he was not violent with her.

In 1928, Kodaira was stationed in China and participated in the Jinan incident where he was assigned to guard the Nisshinbo factory, where he personally killed six Chinese soldiers by stabbing them with a bayonet, a feat for which he was awarded the Order of the Rising Sun, 8th Class. When Kodaira was stationed at Dagu Subdistrict of Binhai, Tianjin (the site of the former Taku Forts), he broke into houses there and raped several women and in at least one instance, ripped open the belly of a pregnant woman with a sword.

== First murder and trial ==
In 1932, Kodaira retired from the military with the rank of sergeant and married shortly after he returned to Japan. However, his wife eventually left him because he had a child by another woman. On 2 July 1932, Kodaira attacked his wife's family in a rage, killing his father-in-law and injuring six others with an iron rod. Kodaira was arrested and sentenced to 15 years imprisonment, but was released on parole in 1940. In December 1941, he impregnated a 21-year-old comfort woman he had "purchased" from the Ministry of the Navy. In August 1943, he found a job at a factory as a boiler operator. During this period, he engaged in acts of voyeurism, peeping on women while they were bathing. He divorced his first wife when he was 37 and married a second time in 1944.

== Seven murders and trial ==
Kodaira is believed to have raped and murdered 10 women in Tochigi and Tokyo between 25 May 1945 and 6 August 1946. Kodaira was living in Tokyo at the time of the Surrender of Japan in August 1945, and used the post-war situation to exploit vulnerable women for his benefit.

On 25 May 1945, Kodaira raped and killed a 21-year-old after invading a female dormitory at the Navy Clothing Factory where she was working. In June, Kodaira raped and strangled to death a 31-year-old woman near Shin-Tochigi Station, then stole her watch and money. On 12 July, Kodaira invited a 22-year-old woman at Shibuya Station into the woods to work for a farmer, but then murdered her and stole her money. On 15 July, Kodaira invited a 21-year-old woman at Ikebukuro Station to a farmhouse in the woods where she was raped and strangled to death before stealing her money and geta. On 28 September, Kodaira invited a 21-year-old woman at Tokyo Station to the woods where he raped and strangled her to death before stealing her money and clothes. On 29 December, Kodaira invited a 21-year-old woman at Asakusa Station to work for a farmer in a mountain village in Tochigi Prefecture, where Kodaira eventually raped and strangled her to death and stole her money. On 6 August 1946, Kodaira murdered a 17-year-old girl that he had been recruiting for a job since mid-June, visiting her home and meeting her mother. Police searched for Kodaira after the girl's body was discovered on 17 August, when her parents reported his name to the police.

== Trial and execution ==
Kodaira was arrested on 20 August and denied responsibility for three of the murders in court. On 18 June 1947, the district court tried him for seven of his suspected 10 murders. One of the victims was never identified, and after the fifth murder, Kodaira is known to have committed necrophilia with the corpse. The Supreme Court sentenced Kodaira to death on 16 November 1948.

Kodaira was executed on 5 October 1949 at Miyagi Prison in Sendai. On his final day, Kodaira said "I am fortunate to be able to die on such a calm and peaceful day."

== Victims ==
=== Confirmed ===
- June 1923 to May 1929 – at least one pregnant woman and her unborn child in China
- 2 July 1932 – first wife's father (unnamed)
- 25 May 1945 – Mitsuko Miyazaki, 21
- 22 June 1945 – Yori Ishii, 30
- 12 July 1945 – Mitsuko Nakamura, 22
- 15 July 1945 – Kazuko Kondo, 22
- 28 September 1945 – Yoshie Matsushita, 21
- 30 December 1945 – Hiroko Baba, 19
- 6 August 1946 – Midorikawa Ryuko, 17

=== Suspected ===
- 31 October 1945 – Shinokawa Tatsue, 17
- 9 June 1946 – Abe Yoshi, 15
- 22 July 1946 – unidentified 17-18 year old female

== Media ==
The third segment of Love and Crime, a 1969 anthology film directed by Teruo Ishii, is about Kodaira.

Based on his case, David Peace published the novel Tokyo Year Zero in 2007.

== See also ==
- Shizuka Koguchi – known as "The Second Kodaira"; serial killer who operated during the same timeframe, murdering three women from November 1946 to January 1947 for the purposes of robbery; confessed to the murder of two other women in February 1940 and May 1946
- Kiyoshi Ōkubo – known as the "Gunma Kodaira"
- Paul Ogorzow
- Sataro Fukiage
- List of serial killers by country
- List of serial killers by number of victims
