= Public order and internal security in Japan =

Conditions of public order in Japan compare favorably with those in other industrialized countries. The overall crime rate is low by North American and West European standards and has shown a general decline since the mid-1960s. The incidence of violent crime is especially low, due mainly to pervasive social pressure and conditioning to obey the law. Problems of particular concern are those associated with a modern industrialized nation, including juvenile delinquency, traffic control, and white-collar crime.

== Post World War II ==
Civil disorders occurred beginning in the early 1950s, chiefly in Tokyo, but did not seriously threaten the internal security of the state. Far less frequent after the early 1970s, they were in all cases effectively countered by Riot Police Unit, efficient and well-trained police units employing the most sophisticated techniques of riot control.

== Police ==
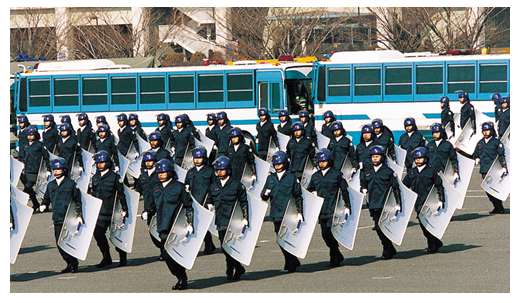
Riot Police Unit

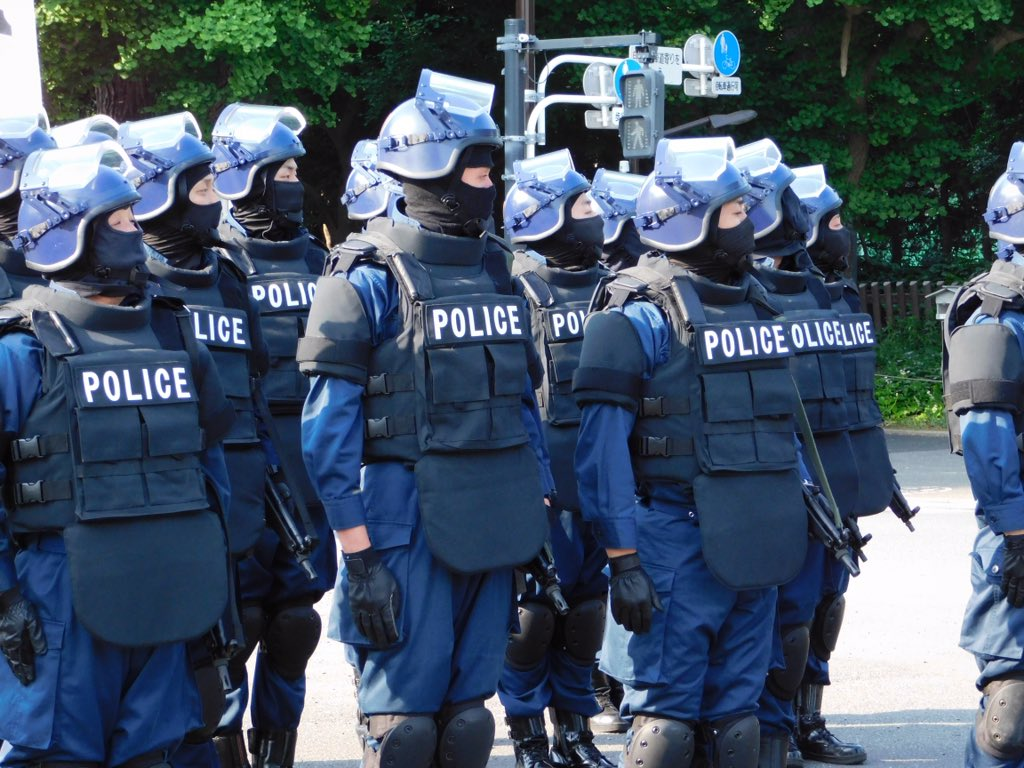
The Emergency Response Team (ERT) of the TMPD

Japan's police are an apolitical body under the general supervision of independent agencies, free of direct central government executive control (cf. National Police Agency). They are checked by an independent judiciary and monitored by a free and active press. The police are generally well respected and can rely on considerable public cooperation in their work. While police are well-trained, they generally have little practical experience outside of writing tickets or answering an occasional domestic dispute.

=== Legal process of arrest ===
When a person is suspected of a crime, the police can hold him or her for up to three days before initiating an investigation. The police must obtain approval from the prosecutor's office for a ten-day investigation. If, after ten days, the police are not satisfied with the investigation, they may request an additional ten days from the prosecutor and a judge. These requests are rarely denied. Bail is rarely granted during this time, and only during extreme mitigating circumstances, as when a child or elder relative depends on the suspect for daily care. After the second ten-day period, the prosecutor must bring an indictment against the suspect or release him. Anybody can be arrested, and held for up to 23 days before being charged with a crime.

When a suspect is arrested, he is informed of two rights, analogous to Miranda rights. The first is the right to remain silent. The second is the right to have an attorney at the trial. The suspect does not have the right to see an attorney before trial or have one present during interrogation sessions. If a suspect can not afford an attorney, one will be appointed for him (The Constitution of Japan, Section 37-3).

Prosecutors in Japan do not generally go to trial unless they have overwhelming evidence of guilt. Because of this tendency, they decline to prosecute nearly a quarter of all cases. For those that go to trial, Japanese prosecutors hold a conviction record of about 98%. These patterns contribute to public perceptions of the infallibility of the police and the legal system, and the perception that if a person is arrested, he or she must be guilty of the crime.

== See also ==
- National security of Japan
- Judicial system of Japan
