= Takayuki Fukuda =

Japanese murderer

Takayuki Ōtsuki (大月 孝行, Ōtsuki Takayuki) (born March 1981), originally named Takayuki Fukuda (福田 孝行, Fukuda Takayuki), was the perpetrator of the Hikari City Mother and Child Murder Incident (光市母子殺害事件, Hikari-shi Boshi Satsugai Jiken) in Hikari, Yamaguchi, Japan on 14 April 1999. On that day, when he was 18 years and 1 month old, he raped and murdered 23-year-old Yayoi Motomura and then performed necrophilia on her body, and also killed her daughter Yūka Motomura (本村 夕夏, Motomura Yūka; then 11 months old), and stole the mother's purse. He was charged with rape, murder and robbery, and was handed the death sentence although he was not of the age of maturity (20 years of age in Japan) at that time (18 years and 1 month). The appeal was rejected.

== Trial ==
During the trial, the brutality of the details of the incident and the demands by the defense lawyers that teenagers ought not receive the death sentence were widely reported in mass media, sparking a debate within Japan. The husband, Hiroshi Motomura, of the two killed vowed to wait until his release to kill him. In 2006, the courts reviewed his case and in 2008 they sentenced him to death by hanging.
