= Lay judges in Japan =

A system for trial by jury was first introduced in 1923 under Prime Minister Katō Tomosaburō's administration. Although the system generated relatively high acquittal rates, it was rarely used, in part because it required defendants to give up their rights to appeal the factual determinations made. The system lapsed by the end of World War II. In 2009, as a part of a larger judicial reform project, laws came into force to introduce citizen participation in certain criminal trials by introducing lay judges. Lay judges comprise the majority of the judicial panel. They do not form a jury separate from the judges, as in a common law system, but participate in the trial as inquisitorial judges next to professional judges in accordance with the civil law legal tradition – similar to the French cour d'assises – who actively analyze and investigate evidence presented by the defense and prosecution.

== Current system ==
On May 28, 2004, the National Diet passed a law requiring selected citizens to participate as judges (and not juries) in trials for certain severe crimes. Citizens chosen for such service, called "saiban-in" (裁判員; "lay judge"), are randomly selected out of the electoral register and, together with professional judges, conduct a public investigation of the evidence in order to determine guilt and sentences. In most cases, the judicial panel is composed of six saiban-in and three professional judges. In cases where there is no substantial dispute over guilt, the panel is composed of four saiban-in and one professional judge. Unlike under the older jury system, the defendants are not allowed to waive trial by saiban-in. The saiban-in system was implemented in May 2009.

=== Process ===
In many respects, the new system is very different from a common law jury system. It is not a (lay) jury of an adversarial system of common law but one that involves a (lay) "judge" found in inquisitorial systems of civil law countries, such as those in continental Europe and Latin America. In a common law adversarial system, the judge acts as a referee over the contest between the defence attorney and the prosecutor, in which the two sides present the facts of their case to the panel of jurors; the judge in this system is mainly the referee of court procedure and decides only the applicable law.

In the civil law inquisitorial system, the entire panel of judges conduct a public investigation of the crime at the trial, and pass the verdict and sentence those found guilty. For this reason, each member of the panel can initiate the examination of evidence and witnesses, and by a majority (including at least one professional judge, as explained below) can pass a guilty verdict and impose a penalty. Lay judges’ roles are nevertheless constrained; notably, legal interpretations and determinations remain with the professional judges. Unlike the Anglo-American rule for criminal jury trials, both convictions and acquittals as well as sentence remain subject to appeal by the prosecution and the defence.

The Japanese system is apparently unique in that the panel consists of six lay judges, chosen randomly from the public, together with three professional judges, who come together for a single trial (like an Anglo-American jury) but serve as lay judges. As with any jury or lay judge system, it places a large amount of judicial power on randomly chosen members of the public with the aim of democratizing the judicial process. In this, Japan's law states its purpose explicitly as seeking “the promotion of the public’s understanding of the judicial system and … their confidence in it.”

A guilty verdict requires a numerical majority of nine judges that includes at least one professional judge. Accordingly, the three professional judges as a collective have a de facto veto on any conviction that would be delivered by the lay judges. The Ministry of Justice specifically avoided using the term "jury" (Baishin-in) and use the term "lay judge" (Saiban-in) instead. Therefore, the current system is categorically not a jury system though this misunderstanding persists in common law countries due to lack of understanding of civil law criminal procedure.

According to the selection process, the judges selected were to be a minimum age of 20 and listed on the election lists. Judges must also have completed a secondary level education. The vote of a majority of the lay judges for acquittal results in acquittal, but for conviction a majority of the lay judges must be accompanied by the vote of at least one professional judge. Lay judges are allowed to directly question the defendant during the course of the trial and decide on the sentence corresponding to the verdict. The previous system relied only on a panel of professional judges, and the majority of cases brought forward by prosecutors were those where conviction was high. Citizens chosen who do not serve in their role would be fined 100,000 yen.

=== First lay judge trial under new law ===
Katsuyoshi Fujii, 72, was found guilty in the stabbing death of a 66-year-old neighbor and sentenced to 15 years in jail at the first lay-judge trial held in the Tokyo District Court. On August 3, 2009, six citizens were chosen to serve as "saiban-in" and join three judges at the trial attended by 2,500 people queuing to get into the sixty-seat public gallery. Because Fujii had entered a guilty plea, the lay judges' role was primarily pertaining to the severity of the sentence to be handed down. The trial was open to the media.

=== Controversy ===
As in most common law countries where people are reluctant to serve as jury members, many Japanese have expressed reluctance to serve as lay judges. Polls suggest that, similar to developed jury systems, 70% of the population of Japan would be reluctant to serve as judges. Some Japanese have been introduced to mock trials over recent years to overcome their reluctance to express opinions publicly, debate, and defy authority figures. Others have written with concern regarding the harsh secrecy provision in the statute which includes the risk of criminal penalties for those lay judges who would publicly share confidential deliberation room discussion even after trial proceedings are complete.

Another issue is that some criminal trials used to take years if the charge was serious and the defence contested the charge. After the system moved to include lay judges, the trial period was fixed to a maximum of a few weeks. Some commentators feel justice is compromised for the convenience of lay judges and that cases are not examined in enough detail.

The Supreme Court confirmed over 124,000 had served as Lay Judges or alternates since the system was introduced up to February 2024.

== Bibliography ==
- Johnson, David T. (7 September 2009). "Early Returns from Japan's New Criminal Trials". The Asia-Pacific Journal: Japan Focus. 7 (36).
- Anderson, Kent; Saint, Emma (Winter 2005). "Japan's Quasi-Jury (Saiban-in) Law: An Annotated Translation of the Act Concerning Participation of Lay Assessors in Criminal Trials" (PDF). Asian-Pacific Law & Policy Journal. 6 (1). (note that the translation differs in some regards from the law as finally enacted).
- Re. history and development of the pre-war jury system: Dobrovolskaia, Anna (2008). "The Jury System in Pre-War Japan: An Annotated Translation of "The Jury Guidebook" (Baishin Tebiki)" (PDF). Asian-Pacific Law & Policy Journal. 9 (2).
- Anderson, Kent; Ambler, Leah (1 April 2006). "The Slow Birth of Japan's Quasi-Jury System (Saiban-in Seido): Interim Report on the Road to Commencement" (PDF). Zeitschrift für Japanisches Recht. 11 (21): 55–80.
- Weber, Ingram (Spring 2009). "The New Japanese Jury System: Empowering the Public, Preserving Continental Justice". East Asia Law Review. 4 (1). Archived from the original (PDF) on October 7, 2014.
