= Penal Code of Japan =

Japanese criminal code

The Penal Code (刑法, Keihō) is a Japanese law that sets out general provisions concerning crimes, as well as the elements and punishments for the various offenses. It is a foundational statute of Japanese law and one of Japan’s Six Codes. To distinguish it from the general term keihō it may also be referred to as Keihōten (刑法典).

It was promulgated on April 24, 1907 and came into force on October 1, 1908. The competent government agencies are the Criminal Affairs Division and the Director of the Legislative Affairs Division within the Criminal Affairs Bureau of the Ministry of Justice.

The current Penal Code consists of two parts: Part I, General Provisions (Articles 1–72), and Part II, Crimes (Articles 73–264). However, not all penal provisions are contained within the Penal Code. Many crimes are defined instead in special criminal acts (刑事特別法, keiji tokubetsuhō) or special criminal laws (特別刑法, tokubetsu keihō).

== History ==
The first penal code of a Western style in Japan was what is now referred to as the Old Penal Code (旧・刑法, Kyū Keihō) which was promulgated in July 1880 and came into effect on January 1, 1882. French legal scholar Gustave Boissonade was employed by the Japanese government to draft this Code, which resulted in heavy influence from the French Penal Code. This Code took away judges' power to arbitrarily assign punishments to crimes.

This was replaced with the current Penal Code in 1908 which showed influence from the German model. It saw some amendments during World War II and further, more extensive amendments during the American occupation.

== Structure ==
The Penal Code of 1907 is subdivided into 2 parts, 50 chapters and comprises 264 articles.

=== Structure (Part I) ===
Part I: General Provisions
Chapter	Articles covered	Classification of provisions
Chapter I	Articles 1 to 8	Scope of Application
Chapter II	Articles 9 to 21	Punishments
Chapter III	Articles 22 to 24	Calculation of the Period of Time
Chapter IV	Articles 25 to 27-7	Suspended Execution of Sentence
Chapter V	Articles 28 to 30	Parole
Chapter VI	Articles 31 to 34-2	Prescription and Extinction of Punishment
Chapter VII	Articles 35 to 42	Actions not [sic] Constituting Crimes and Reduction or Remission of Punishment
Chapter VIII	Articles 43 and 44	Attempts
Chapter IX	Articles 45 to 54 (Note: Article 55 has been deleted.)	Consolidated Punishments
Chapter X	Articles 56 to 59	Repeated Convictions
Chapter XI	Articles 60 to 65	Complicity
Chapter XII	Articles 66 and 67	Reduction of Punishment in Light of Extenuating Circumstances
Chapter XIII	Articles 68 to 72	Rules for Aggravation and Reduction

=== Structure (Part II) ===
Part II: Crimes
Chapter	Articles covered	Classification of offences
Chapter I	73 through 76	Deleted (Note: Articles 73 through 76 previously related to crimes against the Imperial family. Article 73 related to high treason, Article 74 related to lese-majeste against the Emperor, Article 75 related to lese-majeste against the Imperial Shrine, and Article 76 related to lese-majeste against the Imperial Family. All these articles were deleted in 1947.)
Chapter II	77 through 80	Crimes Related to Insurrection
Chapter III	81 through 88	Crimes Related to Foreign Aggression
Chapter IV	92 through 94 (Note: Articles 89 through 91 have been deleted.)	Crimes Concerning Diplomatic Relations
Chapter V	95 through 96-6	Crimes of Obstructing the Performance of Public Duty

== See also ==
- Crime in Japan
- Criminal justice system of Japan
