= Shojiro Nishimoto =

Japanese serial killer

- 西本正二郎
- Born: October 22, 1976; Iida, Nagano, Japan
- Died: January 29, 2009 (aged 32); Tokyo Detention House, Tokyo, Japan
- Cause of death: Execution by hanging
- Convictions: Murder (4 counts); Burglary
- Penalty: Death

Details
- Victims: 4
- Span of crimes: January – September 2004
- Country: Japan
- States: Aichi, Nagano
- Date apprehended: September 13, 2004

Shojiro Nishimoto (西本正二郎, Nishimoto Shojiro; October 22, 1976 – January 29, 2009) was a Japanese serial killer responsible for four robbery-murders committed in Aichi and Nagano Prefectures between January and September 2004. He was sentenced to death for these crimes, and subsequently executed for them in 2009.

== Early life ==
Shojiro Nishimoto was born into a wealthy family in Iida on October 22, 1976, with his father working at a bento production company of which his mother was the company president's daughter. Not long after his birth, his father was sent on a work assignment in Tokyo, leaving the young boy to be looked after by his mother. On August 21, 1988, he was transferred to the Iida Hamaiba Elementary School, where he gained a reputation as a seemingly normal student, with the exception that he often skipped school because he felt that he wasn't very good at it.

This tendency continued into junior high school, with Nishimoto's performance gradually worsening because of his parents' frequent arguing and eventual divorce. After graduation, he found employment at a forest maintenance company, but was regarded as an unsavory worker who often slacked on the job. Eventually, he changed companies at the age of 21, but in August 2002, he got into a car accident and suffered a herniated disc, forcing him to retire. Unemployed and with a dwindling cash supply, he traveled back to Iida, where he soon married a woman to whom he presented himself as "the son of a famous entrepreneur".

Despite his newfound love, Nishimoto was amounting debts from rental companies and his personal expenses, which eventually forced him to turn towards burglary to find a source of income.

== Murders ==
While driving in his white Nissan Cedric through Nagoya on January 13, 2004, Nishimoto's car ran out of gas. Having no mode of transportation, he wanted to steal a bicycle, but as he was unable to find one, he instead got into a taxi and asked to be taken to Kasugai. Once he arrived at the destination, he beheaded the driver, 59-year-old Yasuo Minato, and then stole 18,000 yen from his car.

On April 27, he broke into the home of 77-year-old Mie Shimanaka in Iida, an elderly woman he had known as he had written a certificate for her the previous year. He strangled Shimanaka and then stole 15,000 yen in cash and a piggy bank. Her body was found later that same day by her eldest daughter. As he was unable to pay off the entirety of his debts to the car rental companies, he started searching for his next target.

By examining the phone book, which showcased subscribers' addresses and family structure for the area of Takamori, Nishimoto chose his next target: 69-year-old Hitoshi Kato, an unemployed pensioner whose residence was isolated from other homes. On August 10, he broke into Kato's home and stabbed him in the chest with a yanagi ba, with the elderly man perishing from blood loss. He then burgled his house, stealing 260,000 yen in cash. Kato's body was found four days later by a trio of brothers who had decided to check on him.

His final murder occurred on September 7, when he picked out a house he had previously burgled: that of 74-year-old Aiko Kimura, who lived by herself in Takamori. Nishimoto knocked on her front door, and when she opened, he apologized for disturbing her before stabbing Kimura several times with his knife, causing her to die from blood loss. He then stole her wallet and a purse with 6,000 yen in them, and fled. Kimura's body was later discovered by her daughter.

== Arrest and trial ==
For his next planned burglary, Nishimoto planned to steal from the house of an acquaintance in Iida. On September 13, he attempted to enter the premises undetected, but accidentally triggered the security alarm and alerted the homeowner. The man quickly alerted police about the suspicious intruder, who was immediately arrested upon the officers' arrival.

Nishimoto was then brought in for interrogation at the police station, where, after spending a week answering questions while wired to a lie detector, he confessed to the four murders that had recently plagued the community. He was charged with four counts of murder and brought before the Nagano District Court, where, on May 17, 2006, he was sentenced to death after being found guilty on all charges.

During his appeal trial in October, Nishimoto suddenly confessed another murder: allegedly, he had strangled a woman in Fukushima circa April or May 2003, and later buried her body somewhere along the mountain range. After his trial, investigators from Fukushima Prefecture were sent to locate the supposed burial site, but were unable to locate it. When pressed about this, Nishimoto claimed that the whole thing was a fabrication made out of a paranoid feeling that his parents and siblings would abandon him if he was found guilty of murder again.

== Execution ==
In January 2007, Nishimoto withdrew all his appeals, officially accepting his death sentence. And thusly, on January 29, 2009, he was hanged at the Tokyo Detention House. He was one of four death row inmates to be executed on that day: two others, Yukinari Kawamura and Testuya Sato, were executed in a double hanging at the Nagoya Detention House, while Tadashi Makino was hanged at the Fukuoka Detention House.

== See also ==
- List of serial killers by country
- List of executions in Japan
