= Yasunori Suzuki =

Japanese serial killer

- 鈴木泰徳
- Born: March 22, 1969; Nōgata, Fukuoka Prefecture, Japan
- Died: August 2, 2019 (aged 50); Fukuoka Detention House, Fukuoka Prefecture, Japan
- Status: Executed by hanging
- Convictions: Murder (3 counts); Rape; Robbery
- Penalty: Death

Details
- Victims: 3
- Span of crimes: 2004–2005
- Country: Japan
- State: Fukuoka
- Date apprehended: March 10, 2005

Yasunori Suzuki (鈴木泰徳, Suzuki Yasunori; March 22, 1969 – August 2, 2019) was a Japanese serial killer who robbed and killed three women in Fukuoka Prefecture between December 2004 and January 2005, raping two of them. He was sentenced to death for his crimes, and executed in 2019.

== Early life ==
Suzuki became obsessed with women's underwear in junior high school and often stole it. He got married in 1999, and had a child. However the marriage did not last, and he got divorced in September 2004.

== Murders ==
On December 12, 2004, at around 23:40, 18-year-old vocational school student Nana Kubota was walking in a park in Iizuka, when she was attacked, raped and strangled with her scarf. Suzuki tried to steal her wallet, but was frightened off by a passer-by.

On December 31, at around 7 o'clock, 62-year-old seasonal worker Toshiko Onaka was stabbed in the chest and back with a kitchen knife on the streets of Kitakyushu, with Suzuki stealing her bag and wallet, containing 6,000 yen. Onaka would later die from her injuries.

On January 18, 2005, at around 5:30, 23-year-old office worker Keiko Fukushima was attacked at a park in Fukuoka's Hakata-ku ward. Suzuki originally planned to rape her, but refrained from the idea due to fear of being seen by a passer-by. He then stabbed Fukushima to death with a kitchen knife, stealing her mobile phone, purse and bag, which jointly contained around 46,000 yen.

On March 8, the investigators received a signal from one of the victims' phones, which was being used in Nōgata. They tracked down the signal and caught Suzuki red-handed trying to embezzle a business. He had been using the phone for a dating service. 35-year-old Yasunori Suzuki was arrested two days later on suspicion of committing the murders.

At the time of the murders, Suzuki was in debt of a total of 8 million yen, accumulated from drinking, gambling at pachinko machines and paying for online dating services, following a failed marriage.

== Trials ==
=== First instance, Fukuoka District Court ===
On June 29, 2006, days after the prosecution finalized its argument, the prosecuting Fukuoka Public Prosecutors Office demanded a death sentence for the accused.

On November 13, 2006, the Fukuoka District Court, headed by Justice Hiromi Suzuki (no relation), officially sentenced Yasunori Suzuki to death. A week after his sentence was announced, he lodged an appeal to the Fukuoka High Court.

=== First appeal, Fukuoka High Court ===
On February 7, 2008, the appeal trial was held at the Fukuoka High Court, headed by Justice Katsuhiko Masaki. He ruled in favor of the original sentence, effectively dismissing Suzuki's appeal.

On February 20, the final trial was to begin before the court of cassation branch of the Supreme Court.

=== Final appeal, Supreme Court ===
The Supreme Court trial was headed by Justice Kiyoko Okabe, who set the trial to begin on February 8, 2011.

On said date, the defense counsel claimed that the death penalty was "too heavy and unjustified, as [the murders] were not a planned offence." While not against the idea of dropping the death sentence, the prosecutor's office demanded the defendant and defense counsel withdraw the appeal, saying that the vicious crimes that took the lives of three innocent people for the purpose of stealing money was appalling. After that, on February 18, Justice Okabe notified that the verdict would be announced on March 8.

On said date, Justice Okabe formally rejected the appeals from both the previous trials, effectively finalling Suzuki's death sentence.

Suzuki would later file a petition to Okabe for a retrial, but on March 25, his petition was rejected. Two days later, he was sent to death row to await execution.

== Execution ==
On July 31, 2019, then-Minister of Justice Takashi Yamashita officially signed Yasunori Suzuki's death warrant, set to take place at the Fukuoka Detention House. Just two days later, on August 2, the 50-year-old Suzuki was executed. On that day, 64-year-old Koichi Shoji was also executed at the Tokyo Detention House for two murders he committed in Yamato, Kanagawa. They were two of three criminals executed in the country for that year, the third was Wei Wei in December.

== See also ==
- Capital punishment in Japan
- List of executions in Japan
- List of major crimes in Japan
- List of serial killers by country
