= Yoshitomo Hori =

Korean-Japanese serial killer (born 1975)

- Born: Yoshitomo Kim; April 29, 1975 (age 51); Toki, Gifu, Japan
- Other name: "Tanaka"
- Convictions: Murder x3 Attempted murder x1
- Penalty: Death (Magoori); Death; commuted to life imprisonment (Isogai)

Details
- Victims: 3
- Span of crimes: 1998–2007
- Country: Japan
- State: Aichi
- Date apprehended: August 26, 2007
- Imprisoned at: Nagoya Detention House

Yoshitomo Hori (Japanese: 堀 慶末; né Kim; born April 29, 1975) is a Korean-Japanese serial killer who killed a couple in Hekinan in 1998, and later participated in the murder of Rie Isogai in 2007. Sentenced to life imprisonment for the latter crime, he was linked to the double murder and another attempted murder in 2012, for which he was sentenced to death and currently awaits execution on death row.

== Biography ==
=== Early life ===
He was born on April 29, 1975, at a hospital in Toki, Gifu Prefecture, the fifth child of a Zainichi Korean father and a Japanese mother. Born Yoshitomo Kim, a Korean citizen, he and three of his brothers were naturalized on August 22, 1984.

At the age of six months, Kim was diagnosed with purpura and had to be hospitalized for several months, and had to continue visiting the hospital for regular medical check-ups until he was 5 to 6-years-old. His father, a dump truck driver who transported cobblestone, was frequently violent towards his mother, and the pair often argued over his affairs with other women. Due to these quarrels, Kim was often ignored and neglected, forcing his mother to admit him to a nursery school. Around this time, his father moved the family to Nagoya, in Aichi Prefecture, but continued his affair. In April 1982, just before starting elementary school, his father moved in with another woman and divorced his mother. As a result, Kim was sent to live with his paternal grandmother, who up until then had a rocky relationship with his mother due to her strong anti-Japanese sentiment.

In April 1985, shortly after he finished 4th grade, his father, who owed a large amount of debt, sold his dump truck and tools and joined a local criminal gang, whose leader was his childhood friend. He eventually headed his own gang, with one of Kim's older brothers even becoming a member later on, resulting in the family moving to a prefectural housing estate in Nagoya. After moving to a new school, Kim developed a keen interest in soccer.

=== Junior high school ===
Much to his disappointment, there was no soccer club at his new school, causing Kim to beg his mother to transfer him elsewhere, a request which she refused as she could not afford it. Eventually, he joined the tennis club instead, devoting himself to the sport even when given the option to travel by bus to a soccer club in a different school. During the summer vacation of his first year in high school, he was approached by one of his brothers with an offer to work part-time in the construction industry to pay for a new tennis racket, to which he agreed. Due to the nature of the job, Kim's pants became slightly torn, for which his math teacher would frequently scold him, even resorting to violent physical punishment, which he forbade the teenager from reporting to his parents. Later on, Kim became a delinquent, pestering fellow students and skipping out on classes, before dropping out to work for one of his brothers. He was considered a skilled worker, but developed chronic back pain due to it. Around this time, he would meet one of his future accomplices, Teruo Hayama.

Eventually, Kim was given a choice: either go to a school trip with the other students, or on a part-time job with his brother and a customer in Guam. He would choose the latter option, as he had wanted to travel abroad, and returned to school in September. Due to his part-time job, he was considered fairly wealthy, as he often travelled with 300,000 yen in cash in his wallet.

=== Marriage ===
After graduating from junior high school in 1991, Kim began attending a high school part-time, saying that "[he wanted] to enjoy school life a little more", but dropped out in the middle of the semester due to lack of interest. He returned to doing odd jobs for his brothers and became romantically involved with Kou, an employee of a local snack bar that he had frequented since he was 16 or 17. Eventually, she became pregnant, and after overcoming his reluctant stepmother's worries, the pair were married. The baby was expected to be delivered shortly before Kim's 18th birthday, but Kou had to give birth via C-section several months earlier, as she had become ill due to gestational hypertension. During late 1993, Kim began a short affair with a woman named Otsu, three years older than Kou, who abandoned him soon after he told her that he was married and had a child.

After both he and Hayama had worked as employees for the company established by his older brothers for some time, Kim's relationship with them began to worsen and he expressed a desire to quit. However, his second brother, who had inspirations of going independent, offering him a new, less labor-intensive job, which he immediately accepted. The following year, the 19-year-old Kim and his wife began working as subcontractors for his brother's company, the "Yoshitomo House". Since it was necessary to own a car for the job, he loaned a car for 1.3 million yen under the company name; however, he had no time to attend driving school, and thus drove the car without a license. In 1995, shortly after his 20th birthday, his wife became pregnant with their second child, but at this time, Kim had begun another affair, this time with Hinoe, a snack bar employee ten years his senior who had a history of divorces. Not long after, he was also introduced to Hiroshi Sato, a high school dropout who had fled from Tokyo to escape trouble concerning bōsōzoku gang members, who had recently been hired by his brother.

Shortly after the birth of his second child, Kim resorted to giving his wife and child monthly expenses, while spending the remainder of his wage on drinking and dates with Hinoe. His worsening back pain preventing him from working, and in 1996 or 1997, he was expelled from his house for not paying rent. While his wife believed that this would make him come back to his senses, Kim soon racked up debts, resorting to sleeping at his mistress' house and stealing cash from her wallet.

== Hekinan murders ==
Around May 1998, Kim (who had changed his surname to Hori) failed to pay the loan for the car, angering his brother, as he had to pay the 1,700 yen to the company. In his desperation, Hori began thinking about gaining money through small crimes, first considering purse snatching before turning towards robbing pachinko parlors. He initially tried to survey a parlor in Owariasahi he had never visited before, but decided that it would be too difficult, so he instead opted to break into the parlor after it had closed. Hori went home to prepare tools, and when he returned to the parlor he saw the store's manager, 45-year-old Kazuo Magoori, exiting and heading home.

At this time, Hori decided that it would be better to follow the man to his home in Hekinan, where he could likely steal much more money he had hidden in various safes. In the day, he surveyed the home and, pretending to be conducting research for a questionnaire, asked Magoori's wife, 36-year-old Satomi, whether anyone else was living with them, to which she replied that their two children were with them. On the afternoon on June 28, 1998, accompanied by Hayama, he went to the Magoori residence and asked to be allowed inside, pretending to be an acquaintance of Kazuo. Hori waited until he returned home, then proceeded to strangle the couple one after the other. The two men then stole any valuables they could find.

Shortly after the incident, Hori's wife, fed up with his behavior, filed for divorce. Fearing that he might be investigated by police, Hori agreed to the divorce, which was finalized in July 1998. Left jobless, he lived with Hinoe until he and Sato started vandalizing vending machines. Not long after this began, his mistress found out that he had been stealing from her and kicked him out. Hori then returned to his parents' house, where he again started working for his older brothers, helping with construction of exterior walls.

== Attempted murder ==
After being kicked out of Hinoe's house, Hori contacted Otsu and moved in with her and her mother at their house in central Nagoya. At that time, due to his back pain, his brothers reduced his workload, allowing Hori to frequent the local pachinko parlors, eventually resorting to him borrowing salaries in advance and changing his savings. About two years later, Otsu became pregnant, causing anxiety for Hori, as he could accidentally mention the double murder in Hekinan. To the couple's shock, Otsu had a miscarriage, which caused her to develop panic disorder. In order to avoid grief, Hori began spending much of his time gambling at pachinko parlors.

In the summer of 2004, the pair were hanging out a bar when Hori, who by then had quit gambling, started getting invested in playing darts. Proving to be quite skilled at it, he started playing professionally. About a year later, he started going to pachinko parlors again, and in June 2006, he quit his job due to a feud with his brother and worsening back pain. On July 7, he also reunited with a female classmate from junior high school, whom he eventually started dating. Around this time, Hori recalled that there was a house in Moriyama on which he had worked two years prior, where the sole occupant was a 69-year-old woman. Thinking that it would be easy to rob, he approached Sato with an offer to help him out. On July 20, the two men went to the house under the guise of conducting a building inspection, whereupon they wrapped the woman's face and neck with tape. Afterwards, one of the two (it has never been conclusively determined whom) started strangling her, causing her serious injuries. When the victim was found, she had to be hospitalized for 56 days, but eventually recovered. Upon inspecting the crime scene, investigators found that the assailants had stolen 25,000 yen and 12 other items totalling 380,000 yen.

Following this incident, Hori pawned the victim's wallet and jewels, and later gave a necklace to his new girlfriend. He continued to go to pachinko parlors and darts bars, but due to growing dissatisfaction with his former classmate, a drug abuser who threw temper tantrums and often beat her children, he put out a deposit on her two children totalling 1.1 million yen. He used this money on Otsu and for his gambling expenses, but the scam was revealed in January 2007, and he was forced to work as a carpenter's apprentice to pay it off. However, Hori eventually refused to work any further, and on February 27, he withdrew 1.7 million yen from the woman's credit card. On March 2, she discovered this scheme and kicked him out, with Hori promising to pay her 100,000 yen each month, but was unable to do so and was left heavily in debt.

== Murder of Rie Isogai ==
After being expelled from his friend's house, he returned to Hayama, who by then had found himself a regular job. Struggling to repay the debt, he resorted to begging his father, mother-in-law and Hinoe to lend him some money, with his father suggesting that he work at one of his factories, which Hori refused to do out of laziness. While browsing for a job on the Internet in June 2007, he stumbled upon an underground website with job offers involving various criminal activities. After posting several requests for such offers, he was emailed by a user named "Yamashita", who claimed to be a hardened criminal who knew how to get money fast. Using the username "Tanaka", He agreed to meet up with the man at a later date, as he had an upcoming darts tournament and did not want to risk getting associated with his new partner-in-crime just yet.

However, on August 20, he received an email from his former girlfriend, who threatened to call the police if did not pay her 50,000 yen in five days. He then quickly contacted "Yamashita" again, and on the next day, they met for the first time. The man, a 40-year-old jobless vagrant named Kenji Kawagishi, also introduced Hori to two more accomplices: 36-year-old newspaper salesman Tsukasa Kanda, and 29-year-old Yūichirō "Sugiura" Hondō, who was also without a job. The quartet then began devising plans on what to do, with Hori suggesting that they rob a wealthy patron of a pachinko parlor he frequented. He bought a hammer and gloves for the crime, and when asked by Kanda if he would kill anyone who recognized him, he replied in the positive.

The plan was unsuccessful, and Hondō, dissatisfied with the outcome, proposed that they try something different. On the early morning of August 24, he and Kawagishi broke into a plumber's office in Nagakute, but the latter got frightened off and left Hondō behind, who eventually surrendered to police and was sent to prison. Later that day, the remaining three men regrouped at a restaurant in Nagoya, where they discussed what their next move would be. Hori suggested that they abduct an office clerk, an idea which Kanda supported, as he believed that these types of employee often had lots of savings. When it came to the location, Hori again suggested the luxury residential areas near the Higashiyama Line. After accepting his proposal, the trio got into a van and cruised around Nagoya, stalking a total of five women while searching for the perfect opportunity to strike.

Around 23:00, they stumbled upon 31-year-old Rie Isogai in Chikusa, whom they approached under the guise of asking for directions. When she got close to the van, they forced her inside and drove to an outdoor parking lot where, under the threat of a kitchen knife, they took 62,000 yen and her credit card. On the next day, her face was wrapped up in packing tape to smother her, but as she was still alive, she was beaten on the head with a hammer while Hori and Kawagishi choked her with a rope. The trio then dumped her body in a forest in Mizunami, Gifu Prefecture, before attempting to withdraw cash using her credit card, only to realize that she had given them the wrong PIN.

== Arrest ==
After failing to withdraw the money, the three men agreed to kidnap another woman from a soapland near Nagoya Station that night. However, after parting with Hori and Kanda, Kawagishi contacted the Aichi Prefectural Police and confessed to the murder. He was arrested by a mobile task force and guided them to the location of the corpse, while simultaneously admitting that he had two accomplices. Kanda was arrested on that same day, but Hori, duped by a fake email sent by police officers to meet his friend at his condominium, was arrested the following day. On August 26, all three confessed while in the detention center, and on September 14, they were charged with murder, robbery, kidnapping and fraud. The trial was scheduled for October 5, but at this time, Hori, paranoid about whether the police were investigating him for his other crimes and afraid that they would prohibit him from contacting his younger son, decided to remain silent on them.

== First trial ==
Since only one victim had been killed, the issue of whether the death penalty should be applied was raised. The Nagoya District Public Prosecutor's Office stated that due to the severity of the crime, as well as its impact on the family and public, all three defendants should be eligible. Despite being charged as an accomplice, Justice Hiroko Kondo sentenced Hori and Kanda to death, while Kawagishi was given a life term.

However, Hori later appealed the sentence to the Nagoya High Court, and on April 12, 2011, his sentence was successfully commuted to life imprisonment. In his statement, Justice Yasuo Shimoyama said that he found indications that the convict had a propensity for violent crimes and could be reformed. This was disputed by the Prosecutor's Office, who appealed against the Justice's decision, but on July 11, 2012, Justice Katsumi Chiba of the Nagoya Supreme Court ruled in favor of the original decision.

== Second trial ==
Ever since the Magoori couple had been killed, the Aichi Prefectural Police had suspected that they had been killed by an acquaintance, but Hori and his two friends were never investigated as potential suspects. However, before Satomi was killed, she had given sake and food to Hori, who had left edamame peels and the plates he had eaten from at the crime scene. These items were kept as clues by investigators, who hoped that the killer could be caught in the future with the help of advancing DNA technology. Years later, DNA samples were linked to both Hori and Sato (who had been arrested for drug possession at his home in Gunma in 2009), who had been obliged to provide DNA samples as convicted felons. Investigators first questioned Sato, who was serving time at a prison in the Kantō region, who then implicated Hayama as the third accomplice.

On August 3, 2012, Hori was charged with the Hekinan murder, and was brought to trial for them 21 days later. On January 16, 2013, he and Sato were charged with attempted murder and robbery in the Moriyama case as well. Designated as the mastermind in these cases, Hori was convicted and sentenced to death by Justice Taro Kageyama, who gave Sato and Hayama life terms as accomplices in the crimes. The decision was appealed to the Nagoya High Court, but on November 8, 2016, Justice Hiroyuki Yamaguchi dismissed the appeal. Hori then appealed to the Supreme Court on July 19, 2019, but yet again, on August 7 of that same year, Justice Tsuneyuki Yamamoto also dismissed the appeal, finalizing the convict's death sentence.

== Aftermath ==
Ever since his first death sentence, Hori has written several fiction books under pseudonyms, but has since started writing under his real name. On May 23, 2020, controversy arose over the publication of his newest book, "Requiem", with the publisher, Impact Publishing Association, eventually posting a redacted version of it. Hori later issued a statement criticizing an advertisement for it in The Asahi Shimbun, calling it "censorious".

Hori is the only one of Isogai's murderers to have publicly apologized to the families for his deeds, later writing letters of apology to them and the relatives of the Magooris. His behavior was met with mixed reception from both family members, psychologists and writers. In 2018, reporter Erika Tachibana wrote letters to Hiroshi Sato and Teruo Hayama asking them what they thought of their accomplice, with both of them describing him in positive light.

== See also ==
- List of serial killers by country
- Capital punishment in Japan

== Bibliography ==
- Yoshio Ohsaki (November 30, 2016). いつかの夏 名古屋闇サイト殺人事件 [Someday in Summer: The Nagoya Dark Site Murder Case] (in Japanese). Kadokawa Shoten. ISBN 9784041025222.
- Yoshitomo Hori (May 25, 2019). 鎮魂歌 [Requiem] (in Japanese). インパクト出版会. ISBN 978-4-7554-0296-8.
- NHK "Tears of the Incident" Group (February 25, 2020). 娘を奪われたあの日から―名古屋闇サイト殺人事件・遺族の12年― [From that day my daughter's life was robbed - 12 years for a bereaved family after the Nagoya Dark Site Murder Case] (in Japanese). Shinchosha. ISBN 978-4103531418.
