= Tetsuyuki Morikawa =

Executed Japanese serial killer (1930–1999)

- Born: April 10, 1930; Tenmei, Kumamoto Prefecture, Empire of Japan
- Died: September 10, 1999 (aged 69); Fukuoka Detention House, Fukuoka, Japan
- Cause of death: Execution by hanging
- Convictions: Murder (3 counts); Assault
- Penalty: Life imprisonment (1962); Death (1986)

Details
- Victims: 3
- Span of crimes: 1962–1985
- Country: Japan
- State: Kumamoto
- Date apprehended: For the final time on July 28, 1985

Tetsuyuki Morikawa (森川 テツユキ, Morikawa Tetsuyuki; April 10, 1930 – September 10, 1999) was a Japanese serial killer who killed two of his ex-wife's relatives in Kumamoto, after having been released on parole for killing his mother-in-law in 1962. For the latter crimes, Morikawa was sentenced to death and subsequently executed in 1999.

== Early life ==
Tetsuyuki Morikawa was born on April 10, 1930, in Tenmei, Kumamoto Prefecture, as the third son of a fisherman. At the time of his birth, Tenmei was a town renowned for its rather rough land pattern, and because of this, his father resorted to fishing for seafood and seaweed. When he was two years old, Morikawa's father was stabbed to death with a stitching awl during a dispute with another fisherman, and shortly afterwards, his mother remarried and abandoned both him and her second son. Because of this, Morikawa and his older brother were sent to live with their paternal grandparents.

When he was ten, Morikawa's grandmother died, whereupon he was placed in the care of his paternal aunt and her husband. The couple, who were relatively wealthy and did not have children of their own, welcomed the brothers with open arms, but Tetsuyuki proved to be troublesome. He dropped out of the Zendomo Elementary School after only one year, and on May 10, 1945, the 15-year-old was arrested for assault and fined a small sum of money. He continued to commit crimes afterwards, and on December 7, he was arrested and imprisoned for another assault and embezzlement in Mie Prefecture.

Upon reaching the age of majority and being released, Morikawa became an itinerant construction worker, working as various sites in Fukuoka, Hyōgo, Mie and Aichi Prefectures. However, he frequently quit due to repeated injuries, and was later jailed for another assault.

=== Troubled marriage ===
Around 1958, the then 27-year-old Morikawa settled down in his hometown of Kumamoto, where he soon started courting a woman, known only by the alias 'X'. The pair married in January 1959 and moved into a new home built by Morikawa's parents-in-law, and the following year, the couple had two sons born one after the other. At the beginning of his marriage, Morikawa made a living by selling seaweed, but after the birth of his eldest son, he became addicted to gambling, refused to work and spent most of the day drinking shōchū. Around this time, he started pawning his wife's belongings to continue with his lavish expenses, in addition to assaulting, beating and burning her with cigarettes. On one occasion, it was even claimed that he struck her on the arms with a hatchet so deeply that it reached the bones, and had on another occasion he held up a knife against her neck.

In spite of the excessive abuse, Morikawa's wife endured, consulting his aunt and uncle about his worsening behavior. One night shortly after the birth of their second son, Morikawa threw his wife and eldest son into a stream behind the house in the middle of the winter, stomping on her head when she tried to get back up. This event triggered his father-in-law to attempt to divorce the pair out of fear that X would be killed. X herself, who could not withstand the abuse any longer, divorced him in the summer of 1962, entrusting their children to Morikawa's brother and his wife, while she moved to the city of Ube in Yamaguchi Prefecture. Shortly afterwards, however, Morikawa located her, forcing X to move back to Kumamoto and attempt to reconcile with her ex-husband with the help of his aunt and uncle.

== First murder ==
On September 15, 1962, Morikawa and several family members on both sides of the family gathered at his aunt and uncle's house in Kumamoto, where they intended to discuss his behavior towards his wife. Deciding that he would kill both her and his mother-in-law, Morikawa left on the pretense of getting some money, but instead went to a hardware store and bought a knife.

At around 20:00, X and her mother left the house and went to the bus stop, intending to back to their house in Chūō-ku. When they arrived there, Morikawa confronted them and requested that he able to talk to his wife, which the mother-in-law allowed. The pair then stepped to the side and talked for a bit, but during the conversation, X announced her intention to break up with him and take custody of their child. Upon hearing this, Morikawa took out the knife and stabbed her twice, once in the sides and once in the chest. Her mother rushed to her aid, but she herself was then attacked and stabbed numerous times in the chest. A passer-by witnessed the attack and called the police, who immediately transported the injured women to the Kumamoto University Hospital.

X survived her injuries, despite suffering tears in her lungs and diaphragm, but her mother, who had been stabbed in the liver and stomach, succumbed to her injuries. Morikawa was arrested by the prefectural police soon after, and charged with murder and attempted murder. On November 22 of that year, he was found guilty of the charges and sentenced to life imprisonment, but appealed the decision to the Fukuoka High Court. However, he later withdrew his appeal on the suggestion of his defense counsel, and was sent to serve his sentence at the Kumamoto Prison.

Whilst serving his sentence, Morikawa explicitly stated that did not regret his actions and attempted to justify the crimes by exclaiming that he had been "made a bad guy" by his father-in-law.

=== Parole ===
On December 8, 1976, Morikawa was granted parole after serving 14 years of his sentence and was released from prison. As it was legally required that he be supervised by a relative, he moved back to his aunt and uncle's house, but refused to get a job and spent most of his time drinking. Due to this, his aunt began to scold him, but this resulted in Morikawa physically assaulting both her and her husband. When his older brother decided to intervene, Morikawa threw eggs at him.

On the early morning of June 21, 1978, Morikawa got into an argument with his aunt and uncle. In the heat of the moment, he grabbed a sashimi knife and attempted to stab them, but the couple managed to escape unscathed. They then contacted his brother, who in turn called the Prefectural Police, resulting in Morikawa's arrest. As he had violated the conditions of his parole, he was sent back to the Kumamoto Prison, where he began to harbor a deep grudge against those he had perceived as having 'wronged' him. At one point, he decided that if he was ever released again, he would dedicate his life to taking revenge on them.

On February 1, 1984, the 53-year-old Morikawa was granted parole yet again. This time, he was placed under the supervision of a probation facility in Kitakyushu, where he was obliged to take on a job at a construction site. While he worked hard and had a steady wage, Morikawa secretly began to plan his second murder.

== Double murder ==
=== Planning ===
While living in the probation facility, Morikawa began to devise a murder plan, making a hit list starting with his ex-wife that went down to his in-laws. He wrote down their addresses and names in a notebook and began planning the attack in meticulous detail, ranging from how he would carry out to how much funds he would need to escape afterwards. Reportedly, his hit list was eventually expanded to more than 30 targets, including the judge who had originally sentenced him and the passer-by who had intervened.

Morikawa secretly stashed 150,000 yen behind his probation officer's back, and on May 31, 1985, he escaped the facility without permission. He then got on a train from Kumamoto Station and went to his brother's house, where he managed to convince him that he was a changed man and wanted to find a job. A few days later, unbeknownst to his brother, Morikawa phoned officials at the facility and falsely claimed that his brother had offered to supervise him instead, which was readily accepted.

From there, Morikawa attempted to locate his ex-wife and her relatives while concealing his identity, but had trouble finding her address. Eventually, he attempted to ask her aunt while pretending to be someone else, but the woman, who had heard of his recent parole and was very suspicious, refused to tell him where she was.

=== Murder ===
Despite his failure to find his ex-wife, Morikawa decided not to give up on his plans. For the time being, he stayed at a snack bar instead of returning to his brother's house. Since he was unable to locate X, Morikawa decided to kill his other intended targets first, steal their money and secure enough funds to continue his mission.

On July 22, Morikawa left his brother's house with a flashlight and portable radio and went to a local hardware store, from where he wanted to buy a knife, claiming to the clerk that he needed it to handle some eels. He bought a sashimi knife with a length of 20 cm and a stitching awl, from where his ex-wife's aunt's house. His attempt to enter was cut short when a neighborhood dog began barking at him, prompting him to abandon the idea and instead travel to the house of 'A', the 65-year-old wife of X's uncle. At around 21:00, he arrived near the location and spent about an hour at a restaurant before heading to her house and demanding that the woman tell him where his ex-wife was. In response, A replied that it was late and locked the window. Angered, Morikawa decided to throw a stone at the window, but gave up on the idea and instead searched for an unlocked gate to enter through. After failing to find one, he spent the night in a storeroom before returning to the snack bar he had previously stayed at.

The following day, Morikawa left the snack bar at night, claiming that he was going to collect some money. He went back to X's aunt's house, but as she was not at home, he again went to A's house. Upon reaching his destination, he looked through a window and confirmed that both A and her adopted daughter, 22-year-old 'B', were inside. He then waited for the two women to fall asleep and hid in the storeroom, but accidentally fell asleep as he had drunk copious amounts of alcohol. When he awoke early in the morning, Morikawa wrapped up a stone in some cloth in order to prevent any potential noise and looked for a way in. After confirming that the outdoor unit of the air conditioner was not locked, he put the stone under it and climbed inside.

When he got in, Morikawa pulled out his sashimi knife and headed for the tatami mat room, where he found A and B sleeping side by side. He approached the pair, and when A woke up to ask who was there, he threatened her at knifepoint to tell her where X was, or otherwise he would kill her. When she replied that she did not know, Morikawa stabbed her in the chest, awakening B in the process. When she noticed that he was there, he began yelling at her before stabbing her twice in the chest. B attempted to run away, only to get stabbed twice more, but still managed to get into the adjacent room, where the phone was located. During that time, Morikawa killed A by stabbing her in the chest and throat a total of 41 times, before turning his attention to B. Upon reaching her, he stabbed her 35 times in the back, sides, chest and hips before dragging her back to her adopted mother. He then put the earpiece back on the phone, and cut off the cable to make sure it was not connected anymore. Both women died from blood loss as a result of punctures in the heart, both lungs, and carotid artery.

Apparently dissatisfied with simply stabbing the bodies, Morikawa stripped both of his victims naked and attempted to hang their bodies in the room using a belt from A's yukata. However, he slipped due to the amount of blood on his feet and eventually gave up on the idea. Morikawa then washed his clothes in the bathroom and let them dry by absorbing the moisture. Afterwards, he stole 686,000 yen and A's watch, sapphire ring, two reading glasses and a bag. He then escaped through the way he came in.

From there, he walked away from the house, transferred some of the valuables to his own bag and threw A's bag into the river. He then took a taxi to Jōnan, and walked on foot back to the snack bar. On the following day, Morikawa gifted the watch and sapphire ring to the two hostesses. However, as the reports of the double murder began to appear on the news, he panicked and invited the two women to flee with him, but they turned him down. Morikawa then left Kumamoto and traveled further north, hiding out in a hot spring resort.

=== Discovery and investigation ===
On July 24, two employees who worked at A's stone crushing company became suspicious of her absence and went to her house to investigate. They noticed that her moped was still parked in the garage and decided to ring the bell, but received no response. They then went to the back yard, noticing that some lights had been turned on unnaturally and one window (the one Morikawa went through) was open. After receiving no response again, one of the employees entered through the window in order to investigate, only to find red blood stains on the floor leading to the tatami mat room. After slipping and falling on the trail, he got up and went to the room, where he found the two women's bodies. Shocked by the discovery, he alerted his colleague and both of them soon called the Kumamoto Prefectural Police.

An investigation of the crime scene revealed no potential murder weapons, but autopsies on the victims' bodies confirmed that A and B had been stabbed to death with a sashimi knife.

== Arrest ==
During her lifetime, A had repeatedly claimed that she was afraid that Morikawa might harm her or her family members, and after interviewing neighbors, authorities learned that a suspicious man had been pestering the pair in the last few days. Examination of several fingerprints found at the crime scene matched those of Morikawa, which had been on file from his prior murder conviction, leading to a warrant being issued for his arrest.

In the meantime, Morikawa had escaped to Tamana, where he became acquainted with a woman whom he had met at a restaurant. The pair spent the night at a local hotel, and on July 28, they took a taxi to the Arao Racecourse in Arao. However, when Morikawa paid 10,000 yen for the taxi fare (3,290 yen), the driver did not have enough change to repay him, so the three instead went to a nearby sushi restaurant to eat. While eating, the driver noticed that his male client resembled the fugitive Morikawa, but did not immediately report this to the police. Eventually, his curiosity got him to check the order book and see that he had picked up the pair from Tamana, prompting him to notify the local police just in case. In response to this, officers from both Tamana and Arao were dispatched to survey the racecourse until one stopped a man resembling Morikawa. Upon questioning him, it did indeed turn out to be him, and Morikawa readily admitted his involvement in the murder. Later that day, a sashimi knife, thought to be the murder weapon, was found in an agricultural canal about 200 meters northwest of the crime scene.

In the subsequent interrogation, Morikawa again admitted to the murders, but denied that he intended to rob them. Despite this, he was charged with murder, robbery, burglary and firearm violations. After being charged, Morikawa admitted that he was a lifer on parole and that he intended to kill everyone on his hit list.

== Trial ==
Morikawa's trial was held at the Kumamoto District Court, where he reiterated that he intended to kill all of his ex-wife's relatives. Upon hearing this, B's father, who attended the proceedings, requested that when he was convicted, Morikawa should be executed.

On August 5, 1986, Morikawa was found guilty on all charges and sentenced to death by Justice Katsumi Araki. Both Morikawa and his defense council admitted that he was indeed responsible for the crimes, but claimed the crime was committed on impulse during a drinking binge and robbery was not the main intention. This was dismissed by the judges on the court, who pointed out that this contradicted Morikawa's admissions during the investigation phase. In addition to that, they pointed out that the brutality of the crime, Morikawa's lack of remorse and victim-blaming, and the fact that he committed it while on parole for another murder reinforced their view that he could not be rehabilitated.

Morikawa appealed the sentence to the Fukuoka High Court two days later, but Justice Yoshiro Asano dismissed his appeal on June 22, 1987, citing the premeditation of the crime. His appeal to the Supreme Court was also dismissed on September 24, 1992, by Justice Seiichi Ohori.

== Execution ==
On September 1, 1999, a death penalty abolitionist group filed a personal protection claim on behalf of Morikawa and three other death row inmates who were at risk of execution. The claim was dismissed by the Fukuoka High Court only six days later, followed by another dismissal by the Supreme Court on September 13.

On September 10, 1999, Morikawa was hanged at the Fukuoka Detention House. On that day, two other death row inmates, who had also been sentenced to death after committing murder while on parole, were also hanged in other execution sites. The executions were the subject of protest by fifteen members of an abolitionist group, who demanded to speak to the director of the Fukuoka Detention House. When their request was denied, one of the members read aloud a statement condemning the hangings, which they later gave to prison staff.

== See also ==
- List of serial killers by country
- Capital punishment in Japan
- List of executions in Japan

== Bibliography ==
- Taku Asamiya (February 20, 2014). "熊本母娘殺害事件" [Kumamoto Continuous Murders Case]. 殺人者はそこにいる―逃げ切れない狂気、非情の13事件 [The murders are there - 13 crazy, ruthless incidents] (in Japanese). Shincho Bunko. pp. 88–142. ISBN 978-4101239132.
