= Miyuki Ueta =

Japanese murderer and suspected serial killer (1973–2023)

- Born: 21 December 1973; Kurayoshi, Tottori, Japan
- Died: 14 January 2023 (aged 49); Hiroshima Detention House, Japan
- Conviction: Murder (2 counts)
- Penalty: Death

Details
- Victims: 2–6
- Span of crimes: 2004–2009
- Country: Japan
- State: Tottori
- Date apprehended: 2 November 2009

Miyuki Ueta (上田 美由紀, Ueta Miyuki; 21 December 1973 – 14 January 2023) was a Japanese murderer and suspected serial killer, convicted of two murders in the Tottori suspicious death series case between May 2004 and October 2009.

== Case summary ==
On 2 November 2009, Ueta, a snack hostess, was arrested for defrauding a woman of 1.26 million yen. After some further investigations, authorities noticed that all of the men she dated died under suspicious circumstances. Soon after, the deaths were carefully examined.

In January 2010, Ueta was arrested for robbery and murder of two of her dates.

=== Suspicious deaths ===
Akira Seo (42)
On 13 May 2004, Seo, a journalist and Ueta's boyfriend at the time, was run over by a train at the Inbi Line in Tottori.
Things like "I was happy to meet you" were written on a supposed suicide note, and the Tottori Prefectural Police treated the death as a suicide because of it. No autopsy was made on the body. Akira had had money trouble with Ueta, and was frequently indebted with co-workers.
Shinichi Furuta (27)
On 18 August 2007, Furuta went out on the shore near Tottori's sand dunes so he could collect shells with his family. He was found drowning in the sea, and later died in hospital, 10 days after being transported there.
Furuta could not swim. He acquainted himself with Ueta at the snack bar around 2001, and she came to live with him around 2005. Shinichi was assaulted with hot water by her on a daily basis.
Houitsu Sakai
In February 2008, the body of police officer Sakai was found hanged in the mountains on the outskirts of Tottori.
Sakai was a regular patron of the snack bar, and it was said that there was financial trouble between him and Ueta.
Kazumi Yabe (47) [conviction]
In the early morning of 11 April 2009, Yabe, a truck driver, was found floating in the sea off Hokuei.
In addition to finding sleeping agents in his body, authorities also detected sand in Yabe's lungs (in the case of drowning, it could not be possible for it to enter naturally). There were too many unnatural elements surrounding the death, and it was concluded that the possibility of murder was very high.
Hideki Maruyama (57) [conviction]
On 7 October, Maruyama, an electronics store owner, was found 4 kilometers away from his Maamakawa home in Tottori, beaten and left to die in a river.
The day before, Hideki had decided to "go collect his family" from Inokoshi, and later go somewhere with the car. As a result of the investigations, Maruyama's car was found about 10 meters away from the crime scene, and with a background check of the car navigation systems, it was found that he had visited Ueta's house numerous times.
Ueta was his housemate, and owed about 1.4 million yen to Maruyama, a likely reason for his murder. In addition, the murder scene indicated that Hideki had been pressed into the shallow river with a depth of 20 cm. by a third party. Like with Yabe, sleeping agents were located in his body.
Kazumi Taguchi (58)
On 27 October, the unemployed Taguchi, who lived in the same apartment with Ueta, died suddenly from a supposed illness.
In September, Taguchi rented a car from Ueta and crashed in front of Tottori Station while driving. At that time, Ueta had received 80,000 yen from Kazumi, whom allegedly wanted to talk about "the other party", but that discussion never occurred.
A month later, Taguchi fell into a coma and died. He was a regular patron of Ueta's snack bar, and even had a key to her home.

== Arrest ==
In this case, Miyuki Ueta was arrested on 2 November 2009, for fraud, with the Tottori Prefectural Police using her real name and distributing the press release to news agencies. However, she remained anonymous for five days after the suspicious deaths were discovered. Lay judges are considered for murder cases, so that the public is prejudiced against the defendant. However, most of the weekly magazines published the suspect's real name and photographs of her likeness, including sensational headlines reporting her upbringing and life situation. Shukan Shincho explained the reason for this as "high social interest, and the right to freedom of information", and Shukan Bunshun for the "seriousness" of the crimes.

According to media researcher Keiichi Katsura, the series of reports of Ueta's real name did not slow even after police decided to point out that her guilt was not even established yet.

After Ueta was arrested for robbery and murder on 28 January 2010, news agencies and major newspapers switched to reporting her real name officially.

== Trial ==
Since there was no direct evidence in the witness testimony, the prosecutors resorted to using circumstantial evidence.

On 4 December 2012, Takashi Noguchi, the presiding judge, sentenced Miyuki Ueta to death. That was his second death sentenced handed against a female criminal, the first being Kanae Kijima. Both defendants appealed their sentences on the same day as their verdicts.

On 20 March 2014, the Matsue Branch of the Hiroshima High Court, headed by Judge Ihei Tsukamoto, dismissed the appeal in favor of the death penalty. Ueta appealed to the Supreme Court on the same day.

Presiding Judge Hiroshi Koike set the second trial to open on 29 June 2017.

On that date, the Supreme Court trial's opening session began. The prosecution said that she was definitely guilty of the two murders, as it was impossible for the accused to just lend a shoulder to a man drugged on sleeping pills and take him to his supposed "suicide location", without being directly responsible for it. As such, they asked for the appeal to be dismissed, as the accused "committed the murders and was fully responsible".

On 5 July Koiki set the second trial for 27 July.

On said date, the second Supreme Court trial, again headed by Hiroshi Koike, rejected Ueta's appeal, thus confirming her death sentence.

Ueta appealed the decision, alleging that the Supreme Court was prejudiced against her, but on 23 August that appeal was also rejected, confirming the death sentence for the final time. Miyuki Ueta is the 16th post-war and second female prisoner to be given such a sentence, preceded only by the aforementioned Kanae Kijima.

== Lawsuit from another death row prisoner ==
One magazine supporting Masumi Hayashi, convicted in the Wakayama curry-poisoning in 1998 and currently incarcerated in the Osaka Detention House, drew comparisons between her and Ueta's case, despite them having no relation. Some claim that the two women were familiar with each other in some way. On 28 December 2016, Hayashi filed a civil lawsuit before the Tokyo District Court, seeking 10 million yen in damages. The suit was decided to be heard before the Matsue District Court in March 2017.

== On death row ==
Since her 2009 conviction, Ueta was housed in the Matsue District Prison, but in 2017, she was transferred to the Hiroshima Detention House.

== Death ==
Ueta died on 14 January 2023, of asphyxiation after choking on food while incarcerated at the Hiroshima Detention House. She was 49.

== Bibliography ==
- Aoki, Osamu (12 November 2013). Tottori Continuous Suspicious Death Case. Kodansha. ISBN 978-4062186735.
- Aoki, Osamu (21 January 2016). Two consecutive cases of suspicious deaths. Kodansha. ISBN 978-4062816397.
  - This book also includes the Kanae Kijima case.

== See also ==
- List of serial killers by country
