= List of executions in Japan since 1993 =

Capital punishment is a legal penalty for homicide in Japan, and is applied in cases of multiple homicides or a single aggravated homicide. Executions in Japan are carried out by hanging, and the country has seven execution chambers, all located in major cities.

After a four-year moratorium, executions resumed in 1993 and up to 15 have taken place almost each year since then. Thirteen of those executed in 2018 had taken part in the Tokyo subway sarin attack of 1995.

== List of people executed since 1993 ==
No.	Name	Age	Sex	Date	Place	Crime	Victim(s)	Minister of Justice
1	Seikichi Kondo	55	M	26 March 1993	Sendai	Multiple murders	2	Masaharu Gotoda
2	Shujiro Tachikawa	62	M	26 March 1993	Osaka	Multiple murders	2	Masaharu Gotoda
3	Tetsuo Kawanaka	48	M	26 March 1993	Osaka	Multiple murders	3	Masaharu Gotoda
4	Tadao Kojima	61	M	26 November 1993	Sapporo	Multiple murders	3	Akira Mikazuki
5	Yukio Seki	47	M	26 November 1993	Tokyo	Single murder	1	Akira Mikazuki
6	Hideo Deguchi	70	M	26 November 1993	Osaka	Multiple murders	2	Akira Mikazuki
7	Toru Sakaguchi	56	M	26 November 1993	Osaka	Multiple murders	2	Akira Mikazuki
8	Yukio Ajima	44	M	1 December 1994	Tokyo	Multiple murders	3	Isao Maeda
9	Kazumi Sasaki	66	M	1 December 1994	Sendai	Multiple murders*	2	Isao Maeda
10	Eiji Fujioka	40	M	26 May 1995	Osaka	Multiple murders	2	Isao Maeda
11	Fusao Suda	54	M	26 May 1995	Tokyo	Single murder	1	Isao Maeda
12	Shigeho Tanaka	69	M	26 May 1995	Tokyo	Single murder	1	Isao Maeda
13	Shuji Kimura	45	M	21 December 1995	Nagoya	Single murder	1	Hiroshi Miyazawa
14	Naoto Hirata	63	M	21 December 1995	Fukuoka	Multiple murders	2	Hiroshi Miyazawa
15	Tokujirou Shinohara	68	M	21 December 1995	Tokyo	Multiple murders*	2	Hiroshi Miyazawa
16	Yoshiaki Sugimoto	49	M	11 July 1996	Fukuoka	Single murder	1	Ritsuko Nagao
17	Kazumi Yokoyama	43	M	11 July 1996	Fukuoka	Single murder	1	Ritsuko Nagao
18	Mikio Ishida	48	M	11 July 1996	Tokyo	Multiple murders	2	Ritsuko Nagao
19	Yoshihito Imai	55	M	20 December 1996	Tokyo	Multiple murders	3	Isao Matsuura
20	Mitsunari Hirata	60	M	20 December 1996	Tokyo	Multiple murders	2	Isao Matsuura
21	Satoru Noguchi	50	M	20 December 1996	Tokyo	Multiple murders	2	Isao Matsuura
22	Yasumasa Hidaka	54	M	1 August 1997	Sapporo	Multiple murders	7	Isao Matsuura
23	Nobuko Hidaka	51	F	1 August 1997	Sapporo	Multiple murders	7	Isao Matsuura
24	Hideki Kanda	43	M	1 August 1997	Tokyo	Multiple murders	3	Isao Matsuura
25	Norio Nagayama	48	M	1 August 1997	Tokyo	Multiple murders	4	Isao Matsuura
26	Masahiro Muratake	54	M	25 June 1998	Fukuoka	Multiple murders	3	Kokichi Shimoinaba
27	Yukihisa Takeyasu	66	M	25 June 1998	Fukuoka	Multiple murders*	1	Kokichi Shimoinaba
28	Shinji Shimazu	66	M	25 June 1998	Tokyo	Multiple murders*	1	Kokichi Shimoinaba
29	Masamichi Ida	56	M	19 November 1998	Nagoya	Multiple murders	3	Shozaburo Nakamura
30	Tatsuaki Nishio	61	M	19 November 1998	Nagoya	Single murder	1	Shozaburo Nakamura
31	Akira Tsuda	59	M	19 November 1998	Hiroshima	Single murder	1	Shozaburo Nakamura
32	Masashi Satou	62	M	10 September 1999	Tokyo	Multiple murders*	1	Takao Jinnouchi
33	Katsutoshi Takada	61	M	10 September 1999	Sendai	Multiple murders*	1	Takao Jinnouchi
34	Tetsuyuki Morikawa	69	M	10 September 1999	Fukuoka	Multiple murders*	2	Takao Jinnouchi
35	Teruo Ono	62	M	17 December 1999	Fukuoka	Multiple murders*	1	Hideo Usui
36	Kazuo Sagawa	48	M	17 December 1999	Tokyo	Multiple murders	2	Hideo Usui
37	Kiyotaka Katsuta	52	M	30 November 2000	Nagoya	Multiple murders	22	Okiharu Yasuoka
38	Takashi Miyawaki	57	M	30 November 2000	Nagoya	Multiple murders	3	Okiharu Yasuoka
39	Kunikatsu Oishi	55	M	30 November 2000	Fukuoka	Multiple murders	3	Okiharu Yasuoka
40	Toshihiko Hasegawa	51	M	27 December 2001	Nagoya	Multiple murders	3	Mayumi Moriyama
41	Kojiro Asakura	66	M	27 December 2001	Tokyo	Multiple murders	5	Mayumi Moriyama
42	Ryuya Haruta	36	M	18 September 2002	Fukuoka	Single murder	1	Mayumi Moriyama
43	Yoshiteru Hamada	51	M	18 September 2002	Nagoya	Multiple murders*	3	Mayumi Moriyama
44	Sinji Mukai	42	M	12 September 2003	Osaka	Multiple murders	3	Mayumi Moriyama
45	Sueo Shimazaki	59	M	14 September 2004	Fukuoka	Multiple murders	3	Daizo Nozawa
46	Mamoru Takuma	40	M	14 September 2004	Osaka	Multiple murders	8	Daizo Nozawa
47	Susumu Kitagawa	58	M	16 September 2005	Osaka	Multiple murders	2	Chieko Nono
48	Hiroaki Hidaka	44	M	25 December 2006	Hiroshima	Multiple murders	4	Jinen Nagase
49	Yoshimitsu Akiyama	77	M	25 December 2006	Tokyo	Single murder	1	Jinen Nagase
50	Yoshio Fujinami	75	M	25 December 2006	Tokyo	Multiple murders	2	Jinen Nagase
51	Michio Fukuoka	64	M	25 December 2006	Osaka	Multiple murders	3	Jinen Nagase
52	Yoshikatsu Oda	59	M	27 April 2007	Fukuoka	Multiple murders	2	Jinen Nagase
53	Masahiro Tanaka	42	M	27 April 2007	Tokyo	Multiple murders	4	Jinen Nagase
54	Kosaku Nada	56	M	27 April 2007	Osaka	Multiple murders	2	Jinen Nagase
55	Hifumi Takezawa	69	M	23 August 2007	Tokyo	Multiple murders	3	Jinen Nagase
56	Kozo Segawa	60	M	23 August 2007	Nagoya	Multiple murders	2	Jinen Nagase
57	Yoshio Iwamoto	62	M	23 August 2007	Tokyo	Multiple murders	2	Jinen Nagase
58	Seiha Fujima	47	M	7 December 2007	Tokyo	Multiple murders	5	Kunio Hatoyama
59	Hiroki Fukawa	42	M	7 December 2007	Tokyo	Multiple murders	2	Kunio Hatoyama
60	Noboru Ikemoto	74	M	7 December 2007	Osaka	Multiple murders	3	Kunio Hatoyama
61	Masahiko Matsubara	63	M	1 February 2008	Osaka	Multiple murders	2	Kunio Hatoyama
62	Takashi Mochida	65	M	1 February 2008	Tokyo	Multiple murders*	1	Kunio Hatoyama
63	Keishi Nago	37	M	1 February 2008	Fukuoka	Multiple murders	2	Kunio Hatoyama
64	Kaoru Okashita	61	M	10 April 2008	Tokyo	Multiple murders	2	Kunio Hatoyama
65	Masahito Sakamoto	41	M	10 April 2008	Tokyo	Single murder	1	Kunio Hatoyama
66	Katsuyoshi Nakamoto	64	M	10 April 2008	Osaka	Multiple murders	2	Kunio Hatoyama
67	Masaharu Nakamura	61	M	10 April 2008	Osaka	Multiple murders	2	Kunio Hatoyama
68	Tsutomu Miyazaki	45	M	17 June 2008	Tokyo	Multiple murders	4	Kunio Hatoyama
69	Yoshio Yamasaki	73	M	17 June 2008	Osaka	Multiple murders	2	Kunio Hatoyama
70	Shinji Mutsuda	37	M	17 June 2008	Tokyo	Multiple murders	2	Kunio Hatoyama
71	Yoshiyuki Mantani	68	M	11 September 2008	Osaka	Multiple murders*	1	Okiharu Yasuoka
72	Mineteru Yamamoto	68	M	11 September 2008	Osaka	Multiple murders	2	Okiharu Yasuoka
73	Isamu Hirano	61	M	11 September 2008	Tokyo	Multiple murders*	2	Okiharu Yasuoka
74	Michitoshi Kuma	70	M	28 October 2008	Fukuoka	Multiple murders	2	Eisuke Mori
75	Masahiro Takashio	55	M	28 October 2008	Sendai	Multiple murders	2	Eisuke Mori
76	Yukinari Kawamura	44	M	29 January 2009	Nagoya	Multiple murders	2	Eisuke Mori
77	Tetsuya Sato	39	M	29 January 2009	Nagoya	Multiple murders	2	Eisuke Mori
78	Shojiro Nishimoto	32	M	29 January 2009	Tokyo	Multiple murders	4	Eisuke Mori
79	Tadashi Makino	58	M	29 January 2009	Fukuoka	Multiple murders*	1	Eisuke Mori
80	Hiroshi Maeue	40	M	28 July 2009	Osaka	Multiple murders	3	Eisuke Mori
81	Yukio Yamaji	25	M	28 July 2009	Osaka	Multiple murders*	2	Eisuke Mori
82	Chen Detong	41	M	28 July 2009	Tokyo	Multiple murders	3	Eisuke Mori
83	Kazuo Shinozawa	59	M	28 July 2010	Tokyo	Multiple murders	6	Keiko Chiba
84	Hidenori Ogata	33	M	28 July 2010	Tokyo	Multiple murders	2	Keiko Chiba
85	Yasuaki Uwabe	48	M	29 March 2012	Hiroshima	Multiple murders	5	Toshio Ogawa
86	Tomoyuki Furusawa	46	M	29 March 2012	Tokyo	Multiple murders	3	Toshio Ogawa
87	Yasutoshi Matsuda	44	M	29 March 2012	Fukuoka	Multiple murders	2	Toshio Ogawa
88	Junya Hattori	40	M	3 August 2012	Tokyo	Single murder	1	Makoto Taki
89	Kyozo Matsumura	31	M	3 August 2012	Osaka	Multiple murders	2	Makoto Taki
90	Sachiko Eto	65	F	27 September 2012	Sendai	Multiple murders	6	Makoto Taki
91	Yukinori Matsuda	39	M	27 September 2012	Fukuoka	Multiple murders	2	Makoto Taki
92	Masahiro Kanagawa	29	M	21 February 2013	Tokyo	Multiple murders	2	Sadakazu Tanigaki
93	Keiki Kano	62	M	21 February 2013	Nagoya	Multiple murders*	1	Sadakazu Tanigaki
94	Kaoru Kobayashi	44	M	21 February 2013	Osaka	Single murder	1	Sadakazu Tanigaki
95	Katsuji Hamasaki	64	M	26 April 2013	Tokyo	Multiple murders	2	Sadakazu Tanigaki
96	Yoshihide Miyagi	56	M	26 April 2013	Tokyo	Multiple murders	2	Sadakazu Tanigaki
97	Tokuhisa Kumagai	73	M	12 September 2013	Tokyo	Single murder	1	Sadakazu Tanigaki
98	Mitsuo Fujishima	55	M	12 December 2013	Tokyo	Multiple murders	2	Sadakazu Tanigaki
99	Ryoji Kagayama	63	M	12 December 2013	Osaka	Multiple murders	2	Sadakazu Tanigaki
100	Masanori Kawasaki	68	M	26 June 2014	Osaka	Multiple murders	3	Sadakazu Tanigaki
101	Mitsuhiro Kobayashi	56	M	29 August 2014	Sendai	Multiple murders	5	Sadakazu Tanigaki
102	Tsutomu Takamizawa	59	M	29 August 2014	Tokyo	Multiple murders	3	Sadakazu Tanigaki
103	Tsukasa Kanda	44	M	25 June 2015	Nagoya	Single murder	1	Yōko Kamikawa
104	Sumitoshi Tsuda	63	M	18 December 2015	Sendai	Multiple murders	3	Mitsuhide Iwaki
105	Kazuyuki Wakabayashi	39	M	18 December 2015	Tokyo	Multiple murders	2	Mitsuhide Iwaki
106	Yasutoshi Kamata	75	M	25 March 2016	Osaka	Multiple murders	5	Mitsuhide Iwaki
107	Junko Yoshida	56	F	25 March 2016	Fukuoka	Multiple murders	2	Mitsuhide Iwaki
108	Kenichi Tajiri	45	M	10 November 2016	Fukuoka	Multiple murders	2	Katsutoshi Kaneda
109	Masakatsu Nishikawa	61	M	13 July 2017	Osaka	Multiple murders	4	Katsutoshi Kaneda
110	Koichi Sumida	34	M	13 July 2017	Hiroshima	Single murder	1	Katsutoshi Kaneda
111	Teruhiko Seki	44	M	19 December 2017	Tokyo	Multiple murders	4	Yōko Kamikawa
112	Kiyoshi Matsui	69	M	19 December 2017	Tokyo	Multiple murders	3	Yōko Kamikawa
113	Shoko Asahara	63	M	6 July 2018	Tokyo	Multiple murders	29	Yōko Kamikawa
114	Seiichi Endo	58	M	6 July 2018	Tokyo	Multiple murders	29	Yōko Kamikawa
115	Masami Tsuchiya	53	M	6 July 2018	Tokyo	Multiple murders	29	Yōko Kamikawa
116	Tomomitsu Niimi	54	M	6 July 2018	Osaka	Multiple murders	29	Yōko Kamikawa
117	Yoshihiro Inoue	48	M	6 July 2018	Osaka	Multiple murders	29	Yōko Kamikawa
118	Tomomasa Nakagawa	55	M	6 July 2018	Hiroshima	Multiple murders	29	Yōko Kamikawa
119	Kiyohide Hayakawa	68	M	6 July 2018	Fukuoka	Multiple murders	29	Yōko Kamikawa
120	Satoru Hashimoto	51	M	26 July 2018	Tokyo	Multiple murders	29	Yōko Kamikawa
121	Yasuo Hayashi	60	M	26 July 2018	Sendai	Multiple murders	29	Yōko Kamikawa
122	Kenichi Hirose	54	M	26 July 2018	Tokyo	Multiple murders	29	Yōko Kamikawa
123	Toru Toyoda	50	M	26 July 2018	Tokyo	Multiple murders	29	Yōko Kamikawa
124	Masato Yokoyama	54	M	26 July 2018	Nagoya	Multiple murders	29	Yōko Kamikawa
125	Kazuaki Okazaki	57	M	26 July 2018	Nagoya	Multiple murders	29	Yōko Kamikawa
126	Keizo Okamoto	60	M	27 December 2018	Osaka	Multiple murders	2	Takashi Yamashita
127	Hiroya Suemori	67	M	27 December 2018	Osaka	Multiple murders	2	Takashi Yamashita
128	Koichi Shoji	64	M	2 August 2019	Tokyo	Multiple murders	2	Takashi Yamashita
129	Yasunori Suzuki	50	M	2 August 2019	Fukuoka	Multiple murders	3	Takashi Yamashita
130	Wei Wei	40	M	26 December 2019	Fukuoka	Multiple murders	4	Masako Mori
131	Yasutaka Fujishiro	65	M	21 December 2021	Osaka	Multiple murders	7	Yoshihisa Furukawa
132	Tomoaki Takanezawa	54	M	21 December 2021	Tokyo	Multiple murders	2	Yoshihisa Furukawa
133	Mitsunori Onogawa	44	M	21 December 2021	Tokyo	Multiple murders	2	Yoshihisa Furukawa
134	Tomohiro Katō	39	M	26 July 2022	Tokyo	Multiple murders	7	Yoshihisa Furukawa
135	Takahiro Shiraishi	34	M	27 June 2025	Tokyo	Multiple murders	9	Keisuke Suzuki
136	Sunao Takami	58	M	21 August 2026	Osaka	Multiple murders	5	Hiroshi Hiraguchi

The number of people executed in Japan since 1993
1993	1994	1995	1996	1997	1998	1999	2000	2001	2002	2003	2004	2005	2006	2007	2008	2009	2010	2011	2012
7	2	6	6	4	6	5	3	2	2	1	2	1	4	9	15	7	2	0	7
2013	2014	2015	2016	2017	2018	2019	2020	2021	2022	2023	2024	2025	2026	2027	2028	2029	2030	2031	2032
8	3	3	3	4	15	3	0	3	1	0	0	1	1	—	—	—	—	—	—

Note: Inmates noted with a * were sentenced to death for homicide(s) committed while on parole for another homicide

== See also ==
- List of death row inmates in Japan
