= Masakatsu Nishikawa (serial killer) =

Executed Japanese serial killer

- 西川正勝
- Born: January 14, 1956; Tottori, Tottori Prefecture, Japan
- Died: July 13, 2017 (aged 61); Osaka Detention House, Osaka, Japan
- Other name: Masakatsu Kanade
- Status: Executed by hanging
- Conviction: Murder (5 counts)
- Penalty: 5–10 years imprisonment (first murder); Death (latter murders)

Details
- Victims: 5
- Span of crimes: 1974; December 12 – 28, 1991
- Country: Japan
- States: Tottori, Hyōgo, Shimane, Kyoto
- Date apprehended: January 7, 1992

Masakatsu Nishikawa (西川正勝, Nishikawa Masakatsu; January 14, 1956 – July 13, 2017) was a Japanese serial killer who killed four snack bar hostesses and attempted to kill two others from 1991 to 1992 in three prefectures. An ex-criminal with a murder conviction from 1974, he was convicted of his latter crimes, sentenced to death and executed in 2017.

== Early life ==
Masakatsu Nishikawa was born on January 14, 1956, in Tottori, the youngest of five children and the only son. His father was a day laborer who paid little attention to his children, as a result of which Nishikawa lived predominantly with his mother, as his sisters would go to the San'in region in winter to earn money for the impoverished family. In 1962, he enrolled in elementary school, but rarely attended due to frequent bullying, which prevented him from fully partaking in his studies. His life at home was difficult as well, as his father physically abused his mother, who in turn harshly disciplined and often beat him and his sisters. When Nishikawa was in the third grade, his mother, a diabetic who had repeatedly been hospitalized before, died.

In May 1970, he was sent to a childcare facility in Yonago for stealing, where he was taught to read and write. By the time he left the facility, his father had sold the family home, forcing Nishikawa to search for work in Kyoto and Osaka, before returning to Tottori in October 1971. Upon his return, he was taken in by one of his sisters, but was soon after sent to a juvenile detention facility for several thefts. After being allowed temporary leave in October 1973, he worked for some relatives for a time, but eventually quit and filled his day by visiting pachinko parlors and movie theatres. During this time, he became acquainted with local delinquents and began stealing money and vandalizing property.

=== First murder ===
Around 0:30 on July 6, 1974, the 18-year-old Nishikawa entered a store in Tottori and forced the 26-year-old female storeowner to lie down on the ground. The woman complied with his demand, but kept smiling and attempted to talk him out of it, which Nishikawa interpreted as her mocking him. In response, he turned her over and slashed her carotid arteries three times with a kitchen knife, killing her. He then stole her wallet containing 22,000 yen and fled, but was arrested and brought to the police station six hours later. He was later convicted of murder, attempted rape, theft, forgery and fraud, but was given an irregular sentence of 5-to-10 years imprisonment, as the prosecutor presiding over the case, Hideo Okano, believed that he would be rehabilitated in prison.

After spending 158 days behind bars, Nishikawa was paroled from the Matsue Prison on June 19, 1984. For the next two months, he worked at a pachinko parlor in Matsue, using the local train station to travel back home to Tottori. On the night of September 10, Nishikawa, who had money problems, tried to rob an inn in Tottori, threatening the 58-year-old sister of the proprietor with a fruit knife, but was unsuccessful and soon arrested. In January 1985, he was convicted of attempted murder and robbery, and given a 7-year sentence at the Tottori Prison. During his detention, he frequently fought with cellmates, for which he was later isolated and denied parole. Near the end of his sentence, Nishikawa was quoted as saying that "[he] doesn't want to be released because there is nothing [he] could about it". His term finished on October 25, 1991, and less than two months later, he would begin his killing spree.

== Murders ==
=== Background ===
Two days after his release, Nishikawa moved in with a former inmate he had met in Tottori Prison, living in his condominium in Kurashiki, Okayama Prefecture. In the ensuing 41 days, he tried to strangle a female store owner, but fled without stealing anything. On December 6, he went to his ex-convict friend's house where he befriended and talked with his wife, but at one point he grabbed the couple's 3-year-old child and threatened to kill them if the woman did not give him money. He eventually coaxed her into giving him money, but then fled the condominium without taking it. The incident was reported to police, who put out a warrant for his arrest.

Four days later, he moved into the Wake house of another acquaintance from prison, from which he stole 105,000 yen and promptly disappeared. On that same day, he registered at a hotel in Himeji, Hyōgo Prefecture, where he remained for the next two days.

=== Modus operandi ===
In all of the ensuing murders, Nishikawa, pretending to be a customer, entered snack bars and locked the door behind him if he was left alone with the female employees. Almost all of them (except the Takahashi killing) were committed at night. When the bodies were discovered, it was noted that the neon lights of all four bars had been turned off, and that in three of them, the doors had been locked from the outside to simulate that they had closed early. According to an employee at a bar in Kyoto, Nishikawa would approach them and ask that they turn off the neon lights and lock the door, as he and several supposed friends wanted to browse the premises without being disturbed by others.

At first he wore a black jumper, but in the following days shifted between wearing various colored ones. He also used pseudonyms taken from the surnames of prison associates at his lodgings.

=== Kumiko Masaki ===
At around 16:00 on December 11, 1991, Nishikawa stopped by the offices of the West Japan Railway Company near Himeji Station, ostensibly to ask the clerk for directions. However, he then leaned over the counter, said that he was a "terrible human being", and then fled in a hurry; in the meantime, another clerk had reported the incident to the police.

The following night, he entered the "Kumi" snack bar, where he suffocated the 45-year-old proprietress Kumiko Masaki and stole 6,000 yen in cash, gift certificates and lottery tickets. That same night, while riding on the San'in Main Line, he threw out the murder weapon through the window and later disposed of her credit card at the Kinosaki Onsen Station. Masaki's bag was also found there, along with his fingerprints.

The woman's body was found around 20:20 on December 25, with several puncture wounds on her neck and abdomen. The Hyōgo Prefectural Police initially suspected focusing on a friend of Masaki, claiming that there was a strong possibility she had been killed after a drinking binge, but this theory was later ruled out.

The afternoon after the murder, Nishikawa booked a room at the Toshuku Inn in Yonago, paying with the lottery tickets he had stolen. Two days later, a police officer came by and questioned him for an unrelated robbery, but not for the recent murder; he was cleared of the former charge.

=== Fumiko Takahashi ===
On December 20, Nishikawa deposited a purple jumper in a coin locker at Matsue Station, and then put on a yellow one with a bright blue background. On that evening, he visited a snack bar in Matsue, Shimane Prefecture, requesting of the employee that she close the store as he did not want to "listen to other customers' bad karaoke". While he unsuccessfully attempted to convince the manager to do so for half an hour, customers began to gather and he was forced to leave. He briefly returned to Tottori, but had to hide for two hours in a local park, as he had been chased away by a gang of hoodlums who thought that he was a thief.

On the next day, at around 12:00–13:00, Nishikawa entered the "Key" snack bar and strangled 55-year-old Fumiko Takahashi, before stealing about 200,000 yen in cash. Immediately after, he took a taxi from Matsue Station and traveled to Yonago and then to a snack bar in Kurayoshi, where he deposited a bag containing his blood-covered jumper. At 15:30 of that day, Nishikawa drove to Kyoto, from where he called the store owners, but never returned.

On December 24, at 13:30, family members discovered Takahashi's body in the store with three puncture wounds to her chest. By that time, Nishikawa had registered on the upper floor of the "Maki" snack bar, where he would commit his next killing.

=== Kyo Harada ===
Before dawn on December 26, he went to the first floor of the "Maki" snack bar, slashed 55-year-old Kyo Harada's neck with a knife and then stole 5,000 yen. Her body was found in the afternoon of the following day, with two injuries to the neck and one to the left side of the chest, as well as strangulation marks. The Kyoto Prefectural Police determined that she had ultimately died of blood loss. An investigation team was thereafter set up at the Gojo Police Station to investigate the murder. Unbeknownst to them, Nishikawa was eavesdropping on the investigators, and decided he would leave on the next day. He was charged with 30,000 for his expenses, but claimed that he would transfer it from his bank account later and left. He then got into a taxi, was driven to a hotel near the Yasaka Shrine, lied to the driver that his father was staying at the hotel and he would come back to pay, and promptly left.

=== Noriko Murakami ===
On the morning of December 28, he went to the "Nakama" snack bar, about 200 meters away from the last crime scene, where he stabbed 51-year-old Noriko Murakami with a knife before stealing 10,000 yen in cash. However, while he was searching for additional valuables, he was found by the victim's 25-year-old son, whom he hit in the face with a beer bottle and then fled. The son was left with minor injuries, but Murakami died from blood loss at the hospital. The Kyoto Prefectural Police, believing that the two recent murders were related, set an investigating team to capture the killer.

In the meantime, he went into hiding at an inn in Tennōji-ku, Osaka. The next day, when the Hyōgo Prefectural Police put out a warrant for his arrest, he paid 5,000 yen out of the 20,000 he owed to the proprietor and fled.

==== Fugitive ====
While examining the crime scenes, investigators from the three prefectures found several clues that indicated that the perpetrator was one and the same: for example, since the Takahashi murder, the killer had left behind footprints from MoonStar sneakers, and two fingerprints found at the Masaki and Murakami murders matched those of Masakatsu Nishikawa, who had been released from the Tottori Prison in October. In addition to this, three out of the four victims had first been strangled before being stabbed to death, and all four were reasonably wealthy snack bar proprietresses killed at night.

On the other hand, the Okayama Prefectural Police was also investigating him for a theft that had occurred on December 10, and so, a joint meeting between the prefectural police units was held. In the end, it was decided that Nishikawa should be listed as a fugitive for the theft, but would remain a person of interest in the murders.

Soon after, after each prefecture dispatched an investigator to determine whether the cases were definitely linked, all four police units, headed by the Hyōgo Prefectural Police, put out an arrest warrant for Nishikawa. Meanwhile, Nishikawa himself first hid in the house of a former prison associate in Wakayama Prefecture, then went on the Hanwa Line and travelled to Tennōji Station, where he stayed at an inn in Osaka under a pseudonym. He then moved to an apartment opposite that of Hanae Katsura, a famous female rakugoka, and robbed a neighboring apartment soon after. On the next day, around 14:00, he broke into a condominium in Daido and stole a wallet containing 40,000 yen. At that time, this incident was considered a simple burglary since the inhabitants were not present, but it was considered that they likely would have been killed if they were.

From January 1 to 5 1992, Nishikawa hid in his apartment, spending most of his time either alone or chatting with an 80-year-old neighbor. On January 4, he bought himself new sneakers at a shoe store in Ebisuhigashi and dumped his old ones in the trash next to the store, which were later taken to a processing plant in Suminoe-ku.

==== Attempted murder of Hanae Katsura ====
On January 5, about 10:45, Nishikawa knocked on the door of Katsura, ostensibly to borrow her phone for a phone call. When she brought it to the front door, he suddenly burst into the room and strangled her into unconsciousness. When Katsura awoke, she found him ransacking the room, and after noticing that she had woken up, Nishikawa started to choke her again. He threatened the woman to tell where the money was, and when he loosened his grip on Katsura, she told him where she had hidden it. Nishikawa then stole 140,000 yen and fled the apartment, without finishing off his would-be victim. Katsura would later claim that right before fleeing, her assailant said that he was the mysterious killer of the two women in Kyoto and had fled from Shimane, later leaving a newspaper article about his crimes on the front door. She also said that while he was searching for the money, at one point he sat down and lit a cigarette, before expressing his regrets for the crimes and claiming that he did it out of a desperate desire not to starve to death.

Katsura was hospitalized for 10 days due to her injuries, drifting in and out of consciousness, but eventually recovered. Upon doing so, she immediately called the local police department to report her attack. In response, the Osaka Prefectural Police began an investigation into the robbery and attempted murder, and after examining fingerprints the assailant had left behind, they were linked to Nishikawa's crime spree. On that same day, all inns and hotels in the country were put on lockdown, while police in Osaka, Kyoto and Hyōgo conducted stakeouts in an effort to finally capture the criminal.

== Arrest ==
On January 6, around 19:00, Nishikawa went to the 5th floor of a condominium in Daido, where he knocked on the first door he saw. When the homeowner, a 31-year-old office worker, answered the door, he lied to her that his mother and father-in-law were arguing and asked to stay with her for a while. He was allowed to stay inside for the next 16 hours, during which he watched TV and played videogames with the woman's 7-year-old son, even giving her 10,000 yen to buy him a toy sometime in the future. The woman eventually grew suspicious of him after he refused to leave, but still allowed him to stay.

In the early morning, when the boy was asleep, Nishikawa, who had gotten up to get a glass of water, suddenly went into the woman's room and started strangling her. However, the woman yelled out, causing him to release her, in addition to waking up the boy, who started crying. After a while, he started strangling her even harder, but again released her after the boy started crying again. Nishikawa finally released her, apologized for what he did and confessed to his identity and crimes in full. After having her listen to the entirety of his story, he also told the woman that he intended to surrender himself in the morning.

At 10:40, Nishikawa let the woman walk her child to school, but did not accompany them and remained in the corridor. After dropping the boy off, she told one of the teachers that the fugitive murderer was at her house, prompting the teacher to go to a nearby police station and tell the authorities. Police officers rushed to the scene, where they discovered Nishikawa patiently standing in the corridor, and duly arrested him without incident. The Osaka District Public Prosecutor's Office postponed indicting him for attempted murder and robbery, as the woman he had been staying with did not want him punished.

After his arrest, Nishikawa expressed his gratitude to Katsura and the woman for hearing him out and sympathizing with him, despite what he had done. He then admitted to the four murders and explained his motivations by saying that he wanted to steal money and could only get it by killing, but eventually began restraining himself from doing it.

=== Prosecution ===
Over the next few months, Nishikawa was investigated for his involvement in the murders, eventually resulting in all three prefectures charging him with their respective crimes. Since there were no clear provisions about having a single destination to try a suspect in a large-scale investigation, authorities took the unusual measure of charging him before the Osaka District Court, where the caseload was relatively light compared to others.

Nishikawa was soon after indicted by the other district courts and appointed a lawyer in each of them. However, it was determined that he would be incapable of paying the legal fees, and therefore, three public defenders from the Osaka Bar Association were assigned as his defense counsel. At this time, Nishikawa had begun denying all other crimes besides the attempted murder in Osaka, which would likely result in a lengthy and complicated trial. The Osaka District Public Prosecutor's Office thus decided to send prosecutors to look into each and every case, and after reaching an agreement with all involved parties, it was officially decided that the case would be consolidated before the Osaka District Court on May 12, 1992.

Nishikawa was detained in Matsue Prison to await trial, but in April of that year, he attempted to commit suicide by repeatedly banging his head against the wall. He was then transferred to the Osaka Detention House, where he slashed his neck and arms with a razor on June 29. His attorneys claimed the reason for his self-harming was the strict surveillance and heightened anxiety due to his upcoming trial, while prosecutors argued that it was due to his frustration about the evidence mounting against him.

== Trials ==
=== Murder trial ===
On July 24, 1992, Masakatsu Nishikawa's first court session was held at the Osaka District Court, and presided by Judge Akira Nanasawa. He was charged with four murders and robberies, which he vehemently denied and gave conflicting explanations as to why. The prosecutors countered his claims with the accumulating circumstantial evidence, including his blood type matching that found at the crime scene where Takahashi had been killed and witness statements. On the other hand, no murder weapons were found in any of the cases, with his defense counsel arguing that no direct evidence pointed towards Nishikawa being the culprit in any of the individual cases.

At the second session on October 5, the prosecutors presented evidence that the defendant was "familiar" with the lottery tickets taken from Masaki, which he had used to pay his stay at the Toshuku Inn. The defense counsel eventually conceded to the fact that the two fingerprints found at the crime scene undoubtedly belonged to Nishikawa. On October 29, the three judges, as well as members of both the prosecution and the defense counsel were led to an inspection of the Masaki crime scene and its surroundings.

At the fourth session held on December 21, Hanae Katsura appeared as a witness for the prosecution, testifying that she had been attacked by him and expressing her belief that while he had not planned to kill her, she still wanted the defendant to be punished harshly. A cross-examination was conducted at the Kyoto District Court on January 29, 1993, of a female employee working at the scene where Kyo Harada had been found, who testified about the situation inside the store before and after the crime, the presumed murder weapon, etc.

At another court hearing on July 28, 1994, Nishikawa's lawyer admitted that a majority of the 180 points regarding the confessions were likely truthful, but claimed that 12 of them (concerning two instances in which his client had supposedly admitted to all four murders, etc.) were not voluntary, and had been extracted from him in a state of mental and physical fatigue.

On March 19, 1995, the closing arguments from the prosecution were presented, along with a request that the accused be sentenced to death. The proceedings were concluded on May 29, with Judges Yoshiki Matsumoto and Keiichi Taniguchi recognizing that evidence indicated in the latter three murders pointed towards Nishikawa's guilt, but his motive remained unclear. The judgment trial was held on September 11, and the presiding judge, Kaoru Matsumoto, pronounced the death sentence for Nishikawa. In his final statement, he pointed out that while material evidence was lacking in the Masaki murder, the convict's own confessions as well as the results of the DNA analysis and the shoe imprints linked Nishikawa to the crime scenes.

==== Appeal trial ====
Immediately after the sentence, Nishikawa's defense counsel filed an appeal to the Osaka High Court, and on January 21, 1998, an appeal trial was held before Judge Michio Kakutani. In it, they argued that their client was drunk at the time of the first murder, and was not guilty of the follow-up crimes, requesting a psychiatric evaluation to be held. The closing arguments were held at the 15th court session on December 15, 2000, with Nishikawa pleading not guilty. A few weeks after this decision, Nishikawa changed his last name to Kanade, after the surname of a chaplain who had been visiting him in prison.

The decision was announced on June 20, 2001, with Judge Motoyasu Kawakami upholding the death sentence and dismissing the appeal. On that same date, the Supreme Court also rejected the appeal. Kanade was returned to the Osaka Detention House, where he would remain until his execution. In 2004, he began corresponding with American professor David T. Johnson, admitting to him in a letter that he was praying for the other death row inmates, and wished to be reintegrated back into society.

On June 7, 2005, Nishikawa (who had returned to his original surname) and his defense counsel filed for a final appeal trial before the Supreme Court, with presiding Judge Kunio Hamada. The attorneys requested for their client to be acquitted in the murders of Takahashi, Harada and Murakami, while the prosecutors recommended that the death sentence be maintained. Later that same day, Judge Hamada dismissed the appeal, finalizing Nishikawa's death sentence.

== Imprisonment and execution ==
Following the Supreme Court decision, Nishikawa and his team filed a total of 10 requests for a retrial, frequently responding to questionnaires by anti-death penalty activists and claiming that he was innocent of the crimes. His final request was dismissed on May 11, 2017, and his execution date set for July 13 of that year. On that day, the 61-year-old Nishikawa was hanged at the Osaka Detention House; another murderer, Koichi Sumida, was hanged at the Hiroshima Detention House on the same day.

His execution was criticized by several prominent members of Japanese society, due to the convict's upbringing and supposed harsh treatment at correctional facilities. Among these critics were University of Tsukuba professor Susumu Oda, social critic Yukio Akatsuka and writer/former yakuza George Abe.

== See also ==
- List of serial killers by country
- List of executions in Japan
- Capital punishment in Japan

== Bibliography ==
- Supreme Court decision (2007)
