= Koichi Shoji =

Japanese murderer executed in 2019

- 庄子幸一
- Born: 1955; Japan
- Died: August 2, 2019 (aged 64); Tokyo Detention House, Tokyo, Japan
- Status: Executed by hanging
- Conviction: Murder (2 counts)
- Penalty: Death

Koichi Shoji (庄子幸一, Shoji Koichi; c. 1955 – August 2, 2019) was a Japanese murderer who committed a series of murders in Yamato, Kanagawa, in August and September 2001. He was executed for his crimes on August 2, 2019, at the Tokyo Detention House.

== Case Summary ==
On August 28, 2001, Koichi Shoji conspired with a woman he was dating to break into the home of the first victim, a 54-year-old woman. They attempted to rape her by covering her mouth with a towel, but when she resisted, they strangled her with a belt and stabbed her in the abdomen with a knife. He took 230,000 yen in cash, a backpack containing a cash card, and 409,000 yen from an automatic teller machine at a bank.

On September 12 of the same year, Shoji and the same woman conspired to break into a 42-year-old woman's house, press a stun gun to her waist, hold a petit knife to her throat, bind both wrists and ankles with adhesive tape, and rape her. He wrapped several layers of adhesive tape around her face for the purpose of killing her, and pressed her face against the bathtub to suffocate her and kill her. The pair robbed a pouch containing 60,000 yen in cash and a bankbook.

In the same year, Shoji broke into a 60-year-old woman's house alone, threatened her, and raped her. Using the cash card he took, he stole 4.25 million yen from a bank's automatic teller machine.

== Trial ==
The prosecution sought the death penalty for both Shoji and the woman. At the first trial, Shoji was sentenced to death, and the woman was sentenced to life imprisonment, because it was argued that she had been mind controlled by Shoji into helping him carry out the murders. Both the prosecutor and the defendant appealed against the verdict.

The appeals court rejected the appeals of both the prosecutor and the defendant, and upheld the death sentence for Shoji and the life imprisonment sentence for the woman. The woman did not appeal and was sentenced to life imprisonment. Only Shoji, whose death sentence was upheld, appealed to the Supreme Court against the verdict.

On November 6, 2007, the Third Petty Bench of the Supreme Court rejected Shoji's appeal on the grounds that "the rape, theft of money and goods, and the murder of women who were not in any way at fault were heinous," and the death sentence was confirmed.

== Execution ==
On August 2, 2019, Shoji was executed at the Tokyo Detention House following an execution order issued by the Minister of Justice, Takashi Yamashita. This was the first execution after the new reformation, together with the execution of Yasunori Suzuki, who was executed on the same day at Fukuoka Detention House.

== See also ==
- Capital punishment in Japan
- List of executions in Japan
