= Kanae Kijima =

Japanese fraudster and serial killer

- Born: November 27, 1974 (age 51); Nakashibetsu, Hokkaido, Japan
- Other name: "The Konkatsu Killer"
- Conviction: Murder (3 counts)
- Penalty: Death

Details
- Victims: 3–7
- Span of crimes: 2007 – 2009 possibly 2004
- Country: Japan
- States: Chiba, Tokyo, Saitama
- Date apprehended: January 2010

Kanae Kijima (木嶋 佳苗, Kijima Kanae; born November 27, 1974), known as The Konkatsu Killer, is a Japanese fraudster and serial killer, convicted for poisoning three would-be husbands and suspected of four more, spanning from 2007 to 2009.

She was given her nickname for her frequenting of "konkatsu" (marriage-hunting) websites, with her case also being called with similar names (ex. Konkatsu Killings Case, etc.).

== Exposure ==
On August 6, 2009, 41-year-old Yoshiyuki Oide, from Tokyo, was discovered dead in his car, parked at a parking lot in Fujimi, Saitama. The cause of death was determined to be carbon monoxide poisoning using a rentan, but the supposed suicide had several inconsistencies, so an investigation was launched by the Saitama Prefectural Police.

As a result of the investigation, they arrived at the doorstep of 34-year-old unemployed woman Kanae Kijima, who was dating Oide. It turned out that she had had several previous lovers, most of whom had died under questionable circumstances. The police determined that Kijima had been fraudulently posing as a bride, and on September 25, she was arrested for fraud. She had also received 4.5 million yen from a 40-year-old Chiba man, who was living with her at the time of the arrest.

By January 2010, Kijima had been rearrested for seven charges of fraud, while police simultaneously continued carefully investigating the suspicious deaths. On February 22, she was indicted for the murder of 53-year-old Takao Terada in Ōme, as recounted by the Tokyo Metropolitan Police Department. However, his death at the time was considered a suicide and was not given an autopsy, resulting in a very unusual murder charge, despite the lack of evidence for the cause of death.

== Crimes ==
=== Victims ===
Sadao Fukayama (70)
In August 2007, Fukayama's naked body was found in the bathroom in his Matsudo home. The cause of death could not be determined.
The money he contributed to Kijima amounted to 74 million yen.
Takao Terada (53) [conviction]
On January 30, 2009, the Ōme-based salaryman was found dead in his home. The cause of death was determined to be carbon monoxide poisoning.
Immediately before his death, a total of 17 million yen were transferred from his bank account to Kijima's deposit account.
Kenzo Ando (80) [conviction]
On May 15, 2009, Ando, from Noda, died during a blaze that set his house on fire, burning it to the ground. Several rentan were placed near the body, suggesting the cause of death to be carbon monoxide poisoning.
Ando's father was a renowned painter, and Kijima stole paintings from Kenzo's house so she could sell them at a high price. Immediately after his death, she withdrew 1.9 million yen from his bank account.
Yoshiyuki Oide (41) [conviction]
On August 6, 2009, Oide, from Chiyoda, was found in a rental car parked in a parking lot in Fujimi. The cause of death was concluded to be carbon monoxide poisoning. Kijima received about 4.7 million yen after pretending she was willing to marry Yoshiyuki.
Others
There were three other suspicious deaths (two in the Kantō region, and another in the Chiba prefecture):
- May 2004 – death of an unnamed journalist, run over by a train.
- April 11, 2009 – trucker Kazumi Yabe (47) was found on the seabed off Tottori, having supposedly died in a fishing accident. His family had reported his disappearance a week earlier.
- October 7, 2009 – the body of Hideki Maruyama (53) was found lying face-down in a river in Chiba, with his trousers ripped and injuries to his face. He died of suffocation.

=== Other crimes ===
Unnamed man in his 40s (Shizuoka Prefecture)
From September to December 2008, Kijima deceived this victim from a total of 1.3 million yen.
Unnamed man in his 50s (Nagano Prefecture)
From October to December 2008, Kijima simultaneously deceived this victim of about 1.9 million yen.
Unnamed man in his 40s (Shizuoka Prefecture)
On January 10, 2009, while sleeping in a hotel with Kijima, he had 50,000 yen stolen from his wallet.
Unnamed man in his 50s
In late July 2009, Kanae attempted to deceive this victim of hundreds of thousands of yen.
Unnamed 41-year-old (Tokyo)
On July 24, 2009, Kijima deceived him out of 400 million yen.
Unnamed man in his late 50s (Nagano Prefecture)
In August 2009, Kijima attempted to deceive the victim out of about 1.4 million yen.
Unnamed man in his late 30s (Saitama Prefecture)
From August to September 2009, Kijima attempted to deceive the man of about 700 million yen.

== Biography ==
Kijima was born in Nakashibetsu, Hokkaido, moving to Betsukai, Hokkaido around the time she started elementary school. She attended Betsukai Chuo Elementary School and Betsukai Chuo Junior High School before enrolling in Hokkaido Betsukai High School. After graduating high school, she enrolled in Toyo University's Faculty of Economics, but did not graduate. Kijima, who was a skillful liar, said she lived in a luxury condominium in Nishi-Ikebukuro, paying 200,000 yen every month and driving a rented Mercedes-Benz. In addition, using the alias of "Sakura Yoshikawa", she claimed that her father was a teacher at the University of Tokyo, while she herself was a piano instructor and food coordinator. Kijima's memoirs and novels are published in Josei Jishin. One novel was published by Kadokawa Future Publishing in February 2015, under the title of Praise (ISBN 978-4041024331). Since January 5, 2014, supporters have posted Kijima's writings on a specially-made blog.

== Trials ==
=== Criminal trial ===
The first criminal trial was filed in the Saitama District Court, for a consolidated hearing on all cases of prosecution (three murders, six counts of fraud/attempted fraud and one theft).

The judicial procedures began on January 5, 2012; the first trial on January 10; Judgment Day on April 13, with the lay judge trial lasting 100 days.

For the three murder cases, the prosecution provided the following evidence:

Similarities in the murders

- In all cases, the rentans and other items, purchased by Kijima beforehand, were found at the scene.
- Each victim was last seen with Kanae.

Takao Terada case

- Terada's personal computer and keys were taken from his home.
- It is unlikely that Terada purchased the 20 kilograms of rentan; he also had no car or bicycle, and had no record of renting a car. In addition, there is no record of a purchase on the Internet.

Kenzo Ando

- He had never taken sleeping pills before, but more than 10 times the usual amount was found in his body.
- At the judicial autopsy, there was almost no charcoal powder in the throat, which is supposed to occur during a supposed poisoning from carbon monoxide.

Yoshiyuki Oide

- There was no rental car key in the car at the murder site. It is unnatural to throw it away before committing suicide.
- The rentan is believed to have been ignited by a match left near the car, but there was no matchbox. It is unnatural to throw such item away before a suicide.
- Oide had no rentan residue left on his hands, and no gloves were located.

The prosecution said in a statement: "The night sky is spreading out of the window. When the night breaks, it becomes snow-covered. Even if you don't see when the snow has fallen, you can find that it has fallen in the middle of the night." Using metaphors, the emphasis on accumulation of circumstantial evidence was sufficient to prove Kijima's guilt.

On the other hand, Kanae and her defense team claimed that the bribes were voluntarily handed over to her, and their deaths were either accidental or suicide, which warranted an acquittal.

The Saitama District Court, with presiding judge Kazuyuki Okuma, acknowledged the prosecutors' accusations, sentencing Kanae Kijima to death. She was the first female defendant to be given such a sentence in a lay judge trial. She appealed on the very same day.

=== Tokyo High Court appeal ===
The Tokyo High Court of Appeals also upheld the death sentence, and on March 12, 2014, dismissed Kijima's appeal. On that same day, she decided to appeal to the Supreme Court.

=== Supreme Court appeal ===
Kijima married in prison after the appellate court's decision, and had her last name changed in 2016. The Supreme Court, headed by judge Yoshinobu Onuki, decided to have the first opening session on February 10, 2017.

On said date, the defense court argued that "the men may have committed suicide" at an oral hearing. This was not supported by any facts, and the prosecutor dismantled, contributing to the dismissal of the appeal. On February 22, the judgment date was set for April 14.

On April 14, 2017, the Supreme Court Judge Yoshinobu Onuki said, "The killings are intentional and extremely malicious. The defendant has irrational excuses and shows no remorse. Thus, the death penalty is unavoidable." With this, her death sentence was officially confirmed.

On May 9, the Supreme Court dismissed allegations of prejudice against Kijima. She is the 15th woman to be condemned to death in the post-war period, and the first to be convicted by a lay judge.

Since 2019, Kanae Kijima is incarcerated on the Tokyo Detention House's death row.

== See also ==
- Miyuki Ueta
- Bride scam
- Suspicious death
- Perfect crime
- List of serial killers by country
