= Kiyohide Hayakawa =

Aum Shinrikyo member and murderer

- 早川 紀代秀
- Born: July 14, 1949; Kawanishi, Hyōgo, Occupied Japan
- Died: July 6, 2018 (aged 68); Fukuoka Detention House, Fukuoka, Japan
- Education: Kobe University (School of Agriculture); Graduate School of Osaka Prefecture University
- Status: Executed by hanging
- Conviction: Murder
- Penalty: Death

Kiyohide Hayakawa (早川 紀代秀, Hayakawa Kiyohide; July 14, 1949 – July 6, 2018) was a Japanese criminal, member and deputy leader of the doomsday-cult group Aum Shinrikyo. Hayakawa was born in Hyōgo Prefecture in 1949. After Aum Shinrikyo adopted a "ministry system", he was the Minister of Construction. Hayakawa was the person behind the organization's uranium mining at Banjawarn in Australia.

Convicted for his participation in the Sakamoto family murder and several other crimes, Hayakawa was executed on July 6, 2018, at Fukuoka Detention House.

== Early life ==
Hayakawa was born in Hyōgo Prefecture in 1949. His father was a staff member of the National Japanese National Railways. In 1952, his family moved to Sakai, Osaka. Hayakawa earned his bachelor degree in Kobe University. Then he went to the Graduate School of Osaka Prefecture University. After graduation, he was hired by a giant general contractor.

== Joining Aum Shinrikyo ==
In 1986, interested in Shoko Asahara's so-called superpower, Hayakawa contacted the Aum Shinsen no Kai (オウム神仙の会), which then became Aum Shinrikyo. After a phone conversation with Asahara, he was touched by his sincerity and decided to join Aum Shinrikyo.

In following years, Hayakawa was believed to be involved in a series of crimes committed by Aum Shinrikyo, including killing a former member of Aum Shinrikyo called Shuji Taguchi and the Sakamoto family murder. In 1990, after an election campaign by Aum Shinrikyo failed, the group began planning to overthrow the government of Japan by force. To assist with this plan, Hayakawa went to Russia, presenting high-performance computers to the Moscow Institute of Physics and Technology in exchange for access to the technical documentation of military equipment. He had knowledge of the method for synthesizing LSD, and acquired design drawings for a type of automatic rifle. He was ultimately able to purchase a Mil Mi-17 helicopter as part of his efforts.

As the deputy leader of Aum Shinrikyo, Hayakawa arrived in Western Australia in April 1994, and then purchased an area of nearly 2000 square kilometers known as the Banjawarn Station. The organization started mining uranium there – apparently even before the sale was finalized. In his personal notes, Hayakawa praised the high quality of the uranium ore in Australia, although it referred to the state of South Australia, not to Banjawarn (which is in another state).

According to media reports from 1995, sheep carcasses in Banjawarn showed signs of exposure to sarin, the substance used in the Tokyo subway attack.

Hayakawa was arrested in Japan on April 19, 1995, shortly after the Tokyo subway sarin attack (and exactly on the day of the Oklahoma City bombing, although no relation between Aum Shinrikyo and the bombing is known). He was sentenced to death in 2000. In 2009, his appeal was dismissed. Hayakawa was executed on July 6, 2018, at Fukuoka Detention House.

== See also ==
- Aum Shinrikyo
- Banjawarn Station
- Capital punishment in Japan
- List of executions in Japan
