= Kiyotaka Katsuta =

Japanese serial killer

- Katsuta on a TV program prior to his arrest
- Born: August 29, 1948; Kizugawa, Kyoto, Occupied Japan
- Died: November 30, 2000 (aged 52); Nagoya Detention House, Higashi-ku, Nagoya, Japan
- Other name: Kiyotaka Fujiwara
- Status: Executed by hanging
- Conviction: Murder (8 counts)
- Penalty: Death

Details
- Victims: 8–22
- Span of crimes: 1972–1982
- Country: Japan
- States: Kyoto, Osaka, Aichi, Hyogo, Shiga
- Date apprehended: January 31, 1983

Kiyotaka Katsuta (勝田 清孝, Katsuta Kiyotaka; August 29, 1948 – November 30, 2000) was a Japanese serial killer and thief.

== Biography ==
Katsuta was born in a farmhouse in Kyoto.

Katsuta committed several murders and robbed several houses before being apprehended. The exact number of murders he committed is unknown. He killed his victims by strangling and shooting them.

On October 27, 1982, he hit a police officer with a car and stole the officer’s New Nambu M60 service revolver. On October 31, he attempted to commit a robbery, but killed a man with a handgun during the failed attempt. On November 1, he shot another man, who survived. Because he was armed, Katsuta continued to elude capture. The incident was officially named Metropolitan Designated Case 113.

On January 31, 1983, he was arrested while threatening a man with a handgun. He was initially thought to have only killed his victims while robbing them, but later confessed to seven other murders.

He may have killed as many as 22 people, but the police charged him with only eight counts of murder. The police suspected that Katsuta raped some of his victims before killing them, but were not able to prove this. His crimes greatly shocked Japan because he was a firefighter. During Katsuta's killing spree, he had even appeared on television and won multiple awards.

The 1984 film Renzoku satsujinki: Reiketsu (連続殺人鬼 冷血) was based on his crimes. In the film, the murderer was named Kiyoshi Tatsuta. Kazuya Nakayama, who has a criminal record of his own, played the role of Tatsuta.

In prison, he was mistrustful of his fellow inmates. While incarcerated, he met a Christian woman, who was also known by the pen name Yūko Kurusu. He was adopted by her mother and changed his name to Kiyotaka Fujiwara. On January 17, 1994, the Supreme Court of Japan upheld his two death penalty convictions, a first in the history of the Japanese Supreme Court. One was for seven murders between 1972 and 1980, and the other was for killing a man with a handgun in 1982.

Katsuta was executed at the Nagoya Detention House on November 30, 2000. After entering the execution chamber, Katsuta asked a prison guard "Would you please take off my blindfold, as I wish to have a look once more at the face of my chaplain whom I revere?" The prison officer removed Katsuta's blindfold so he could look at his chaplain, a Buddhist priest. While the priest recited Hannya Shingyo, Katsuta spoke the names of his victims one by one. He said, "I'm sincerely sorry." Katsuta's blindfold was then put back on and he was taken to the gallows.

== See also ==
- List of executions in Japan
- List of serial killers by country
- Norio Nagayama - Metropolitan Designated Case 108
- Glico Morinaga case - Metropolitan Designated Case 114
- Sekihotai - Metropolitan Designated Case 116
- Tsutomu Miyazaki - Metropolitan Designated Case 117
- List of serial killers by number of victims
