= Murder of Rie Isogai =

2007 murder case in Aichi Prefecture, Japan

Rie Isogai (磯谷 利恵, Isogai Rie; 20 July 1976 – 24 August 2007) was a 31-year-old Japanese woman, an office clerk who was robbed and murdered in Aichi Prefecture on the night of 24 August 2007 by three men who became acquainted through an underground message board. Because the three men met on an underground website, the case is frequently called the Dark Site Murder (闇サイト殺人, Yami Saito Satsujin) in Japan, "dark site" being the Japanese term for underground websites. Despite Japan's death penalty not normally being used in cases involving a single murder, Isogai's mother launched a petition to have the three killers face the death penalty; one was sentenced to death on 18 March 2009, while the other two, including serial killer Yoshitomo Hori, were sentenced to life in prison on 13 April 2011.

== Background ==
On 17 August 2007, Kenji Kawagishi (川岸 健治, Kawagishi Kenji), an unemployed forty-year-old man living in a van, posted a message to seek partners in crime on a cell phone website used for exchanging shady information. His message, implying robbery, was read and answered by Tsukasa Kanda (神田 司, Kanda Tsukasa), Yoshitomo Hori (堀 慶末, Hori Yoshitomo) and Yūichirō Hondō (本堂 裕一朗, Hondō Yūichirō). He was a 36-year-old Asahi Shimbun salesman from Takasaki, Gunma Prefecture. Hori was an unemployed 32-year-old darts player who was under a heavy debt amounting to four million yen. Hondō was an unemployed 29-year-old man who had difficulty paying his rent. All of them were desperate for cash.

After exchanging several emails, the four men met face-to-face on 21 August to discuss how they would be able to get money with ease. Hori suggested robbing a wealthy pachinko player whom he knew, and the other three agreed. They tried in vain to rob him later that same day. On the night of 23 August, Kawagishi and Hondō broke into a plumber's office in Nagakute, where Kawagishi ran away in fright, leaving Hondō behind. With too little money to go home, Hondō surrendered to the police and was arrested for trespassing and attempted theft.

On the afternoon of 24 August, Kawagishi, Kanda and Hori met to draft another plot at the parking lot of a video rental shop in Midori, Nagoya. Kanda suggested that they kidnap and rob a woman walking on a street and kill her to prevent their robbery from being detected. Hori and Kawagishi agreed to his proposal.

== Murder ==
Inside Kawagishi's van, the three men searched for a woman walking alone beginning around 7:00 p.m. until they saw Rie Isogai walking home on a dark street in the Jiyūgaoka neighborhood of Chikusa, Nagoya around 10:00 p.m. He got out of the van and approached her, pretending to be asking for directions, and forced her into the van. They put handcuffs on her, threatened her with knives, and demanded her money and ATM cards while he drove his van to a lonely parking lot in Aisai, a suburban city of Nagoya. At the parking lot, He pulled a knife on Isogai and extracted her PIN for ATM cards.

Just after midnight, Kawagishi tried to rape her, though he failed in his attempt because Kanda and Hori stopped him. His sudden attempt to rape her frightened Isogai so much that she tried to get out of the van, which made the three decide to kill her immediately. Despite her desperate pleas for her life, at about 1:00 a.m., He wrapped packing tape around her head to smother her and, seeing her still alive, bludgeoned her head with a hammer approximately thirty times, while Hori and Kawagishi choked her with a rope.

After killing her, the three men dumped the victim's body in a forest in Mizunami, Gifu Prefecture at around 4:00 a.m., and tried to withdraw money from her bank account at an ATM in a Market, only to find that she had told them the wrong PIN. Disappointed after failing to withdraw money, they shared 62,000 yen which they had found in the victim's handbag, and parted, promising that they would rob and kill women at random near Nagoya Station in the evening that day.

== Arrest ==
On 25 August 2007, Kawagishi telephoned the police to confess to the crime around 13:00. As for the reason he surrendered to the police, he explained that he was scared of receiving capital punishment. The Japanese penal code provides that punishment shall be extenuated if a criminal surrenders before being identified as a suspect by the authorities.

Finding the victim's body abandoned as he described, the police arrested Kawagishi and his crime partners on 26 August. Fumiko Isogai, the victim's mother and only family member, identified the body on the same day of their arrest. The three were charged with murder for robbery, kidnapping for profit, confinement and abandonment of a corpse by 5 October 2007. Kawagishi was additionally charged with attempted rape at the scene of robbery.

== Petition for death penalty ==
Capital punishment is a legal penalty for murder in Japan, but the general sentencing guidelines seldom impose death sentences in single-victim murder cases. Fumiko Isogai, whose only child was killed in this crime, launched a campaign to call for the death penalty for the three murderers in September 2007. Within ten days, her petition was signed by 100,000 citizens. She presented her petition for the death penalty with some 150,000 signatures to the District Public Prosecutors' Office of Nagoya on 23 October 2007. About 318,000 citizens had signed her petition by December 2008. Although single-victim murderers rarely face a death sentence in Japan, Takeshi Tsuchimoto, a criminal law scholar at Hakuoh University and former prosecutor of the Supreme Public Prosecutors' Office, expected that the recent trend toward stricter punishments, backed by the growing public support for capital punishment, would encourage the court to sentence Kanda and Hori to death. Kawagishi's and Kanda's fathers also asked the court to sentence their sons to death.

== Trial ==
The trial started at the District Court of Nagoya on 25 September 2008. All the defendants admitted to robbing and murdering her at the first session. They agreed that the brutality escalated as they tried to call each other's earlier boasts. Kanda told Kawagishi at their first meeting that he had committed homicide twice, and Hori wrote in an email to Kawagishi that he had just been released from prison, both of which turned out to be lies each of them told to make himself look bigger than the others. The defense attorneys argued that they should not be punished by death because the crime was carried out in an atmosphere that disabled the bluffing men from saying no to each other, whatever atrocious act might be proposed, and because Isogai's death was accidental and could not be said to be so vicious as to result in capital punishment, given the sentences handed down in similar cases in the past.

The defendants disputed over who among them was the principal culprit and when they agreed to kill the victim. Kawagishi insisted that Kanda was the principal and that he had not known the plan to kill the woman until he saw the other two begin to smother her. Hori also claimed that Kanda led the crime and that he had not thought of murdering the victim until Kanda suggested choking her at the last minute. Kanda said that they had achieved a consensus on murder before they began to search for a woman to rob of money but that it had not been serious until Kawagishi's attempt to rape her made Isogai change her attitude, claiming that Hori, who allegedly hit the victim on the head with a hammer before Kanda did, was the principal.

During trial sessions, the defendants often got into quarrels with each other. Kanda made fun of Rie Isogai and called her a liar in his blog, which he started in order to reveal what he claims to be the true story of this case. Kawagishi said that the victim was just unlucky. Seeing the defendants far from apologetic, Fumiko Isogai said that their words were unbearable and added, "It might be better than superficial apologies".

The prosecutors demanded capital punishment for all the defendants in the closing argument on 20 January 2009. They insisted that the court sentence Kawagishi to death despite his voluntary surrender because he was unrepentant and the police would have been able to arrest the three without his surrender.

== Judgment ==
On 18 March 2009, the district court found the defendants guilty of all the charges. It sentenced Kanda and Hori to death. Judge Hiroko Kondō determined in the ruling that Kanda had played a leading role in the murder. She said that their motives for the crime left no room for leniency and that capital punishment was the only option, even after considering that there was only one victim, because their criminal acts were extremely merciless and heinous and deemed to be a serious threat to society. Kawagishi received a life sentence because the court judged that he had provided the police with useful information that led to the arrest of Kanda and Hori.

Major national newspapers published editorials in support of Kondō's unorthodox judgment on the premise that capital punishment should be retained. The Asahi Shimbun and the Mainichi Shimbun claimed in their editorials that most people would be supportive of this judgment. The Nikkei commented that the judgment was reasonable. The Sankei Shimbun aggressively evaluated the judgment as "a natural and down-to-earth judgment of great significance". The Tokyo Shimbun expressed the view that capital punishment was inevitable when they thought how brutal the murder was and what the victim's family felt of it. They also noted, however, that it would be difficult for citizen judges to determine whether the death penalty would be appropriate in this kind of case under the lay judge system, which was started in May 2009. Hiroshi Itakura, a criminal law scholar at Nihon University said that this decision could be a new criterion for capital punishment under the lay judge system.

Four hours after he received the death penalty, Hori told journalists that he felt the words "capital punishment" were "heavy", though he had been prepared for it. Kawagishi said, "I'm glad my surrender was counted and I didn't get a death sentence."

The victim's parents and partner expressed their disappointment at the judgment which spared Kawagishi's life.

== Appeal ==
The three defendants also appealed to the High Court of Nagoya to have their sentences reduced. However, Kanda withdrew his own appeal without his attorney's consent to have his death sentence finalized on 13 April 2009. The prosecutors lodged an appeal against the district court's decision for Kawagishi on 27 March 2009.

On 13 April 2011 the Nagoya High Court affirmed Kawagishi's life sentence and reduced Hori's death sentence to life, ruling that they were both less responsible than Kanda. The prosecution appealed the ruling to the Supreme Court, which affirmed the two life sentences, but Hori was later sentenced to death for having killed a married couple in 1998.

== Execution of Kanda ==
He was executed by hanging at the Nagoya Detention House on 25 June 2015.

== See also ==
- Capital punishment in Japan
- List of executions in Japan
