= Shimonoseki Station massacre =

Mass stabbing and car ramming attack in Shimonoseki, Japan

Coordinates: 33.949°N 130.922°E

- Yasuaki Uwabe
- Location: Shimonoseki Station, Shimonoseki, Yamaguchi Prefecture, Japan
- Date: September 29, 1999; 4:25 pm (JST)
- Attack type: Mass murder, mass stabbing, vehicle-ramming attack
- Weapons: 8th generation Mazda Familia hatchback (rental car), kitchen knife
- Deaths: 5
- Injuries: 10
- Perpetrator: Yasuaki Uwabe
- Motive: Hatred towards society

The Shimonoseki Station massacre (Japanese: 下関通り魔殺人事件, romanized: Shimonoseki tōrima satsujin jiken) was a mass murder that occurred in Shimonoseki, Japan on 29 September 1999. Yasuaki Uwabe, a 35-year-old former architect, drove a car into Shimonoseki Station and then stabbed passers-by at random, killing five people and injuring 10 others, before being arrested at the scene. Uwabe was sentenced to death in 2002 and executed in 2012.

== Perpetrator ==
Yasuaki Uwabe (Japanese: 上部康明 Uwabe Yasuaki) was born in March 6, 1964 in Shimonoseki, Yamaguchi Prefecture, the son of Masakazu and Keiko Uwabe who were both teachers. He achieved excellent grades at school until he reached high school, failing his university entrance exam the first time but passing it the second time. In 1989, he graduated from the Faculty of Engineering at the prestigious Kyushu University with a degree in architecture. After graduation, he worked in the office for an architecture firm in Fukuoka until 1991, when he received his certification as a first-class architect. He worked in the office for another architectural firm, but soon quit due to his social phobias.

Uwabe married in 1993 and opened his own architectural firm, but quit in 1997 due to his mental health. As he ran out of money, he received a loan to buy a light truck and began work in the delivery service industry, a job which did not require interpersonal relationships. At the same time, he began to increasingly isolate himself, and got a divorce in June 1999. His delivery company was successful until September that year, when his truck was lost in a flood due to Typhoon Bart, and his loan was recalled. He asked his parents to pay for the loan but they refused.

== Attack ==
On 29 September 1999, at around 4:25 pm, Uwabe, who was still working in the transportation industry, drove a rented car into the east entrance of Shimonoseki Station hitting at least seven people, two of whom died at the scene. As the car got stuck, he exited the vehicle brandishing a kitchen knife and progressed up to the second platform on the second floor, stabbing a further seven people on the stairs and platform. He was eventually overpowered by a station worker and an officer of the railway police, and arrested at the scene.

== Aftermath ==
After his arrest, Uwabe said that "No matter what I did, it never turned out well, which made me bitter toward society" and "There's no point in living. I'm going to commit suicide. I've always been the only one who has felt miserable. I can't just die. I want to cause great damage to society. The only way to do that is to commit mass indiscriminate murder." He also stated that he decided to use a car in order to "kill more people". Looking back on his early life, he described how, after graduating as a first-class architect from a national university of Japan, he found it hard to open his own design office and began to blame his parents and society for his frustration. Reportedly, on the morning of 29 September, he asked his father to buy him a new truck for his business but was refused. He said that he was also motivated by another crime in Japan three weeks earlier, when 23-year-old man stabbed two people to death and injured six others in Ikebukuro, Tokyo.

Uwabe underwent a psychiatric evaluation which concluded that he had paranoid personality disorder, and his defence lawyer argued that he believed he was being unfairly persecuted by society. However, the prosecution argued that he was sane and fully responsible for his crimes after a second psychiatric evaluation. He was judged by the Yamaguchi District Court and found guilty of all charges and sentenced to death in September 2002. He appealed his sentence to the Hiroshima High Court, the highest court in the Chūgoku region, but judge Toshikazu Obuchi upheld the sentence in a ruling in June 2005. Uwabe filed an appeal to the Supreme Court, but a committee headed by Isao Imai upheld the original death sentence and the ruling by the Hiroshima High Court in July 2008. Minister of Justice Toshio Ogawa signed Uwabe's execution warrant on 27 March 2012, and he was executed by hanging at the Hiroshima Detention House two days later. He was one of several prisoners on Japan's death row to be executed on 29 March 2012.

Uwabe's attack led to controversy over the welfare scheme for victims of crime in Japan. Survivors and the families of those killed in the car ramming were entitled to a vehicle insurance payout from the rental car's insurance, while those of the knife attack were not and could only receive payments from the government's victim compensation scheme, which was deemed to be insufficient. In 2001, the Japanese government passed reforms to improve the scope and amount of compensation paid to victims of crime.

Shimonoseki Station's East Gate was damaged in Uwabe's attack and soon repaired, but was later destroyed in the Shimonoseki Station arson incident (ja:下関駅放火事件) on 7 January 2006, and has since been significantly remodeled.

== See also ==
- List of executions in Japan
