= Special Security Readiness Team =

- 特別機動警備隊 (Japanese)
- Active: 2019–present
- Country: Japan
- Agency: Ministry of Justice
- Role: Riot control; Natural disaster response
- Part of: Correction Bureau
- Headquarters: Tokyo Detention House
- Abbreviation: SeRT

Structure
- Officers: 58

Commanders
- Current commander: Nobuteru Suzuki

The Special Security Readiness Team (Note: The unit's name is literally known as the Special Mobile Guard.) (特別機動警備隊, Tokubetsu kidō keibitai), also known as SeRT, is a unit of the Japanese Ministry of Justice's Correction Bureau.

According to Norio Saeki, Director of the Correction Bureau, SeRT is tasked to handle anti-riot and disaster operations at CB-staffed facilities without diverting manpower from various police or fire departments. It allowed the Correction Bureau to have a full-time anti-riot response unit as the CB formerly used temporary anti-riot teams consisting of CB guards and to ensure security of CB-staffed correctional facilities. The unit assists in disaster response when requests are made.

Captain Hiromichi Ouchi is the SeRT's commanding officer when the unit was founded. Captain Shinjiro Nagase was the SeRT Deputy Captain.

== History ==
The SeRT was established on April 1, 2019, at the grounds of the Tokyo Detention House. On June 3, 2019, the unit was awarded the commander's flag by Minister of Justice Takashi Yamashita.

SeRT was called in to provide assistance in the aftermath of Typhoon Hagibis in October 2019 in Suzaka, Nagano Prefecture a few months after the unit was created to support debris disposal operations. During the COVID-19 pandemic in Japan from 2020 to 2023, SeRT is tasked to oversee anti-COVID-19 infection measures at CB-staffed facilities.

In the aftermath of the 2021 Atami landslide, a major humanitarian operation was underway in Atami, Shizuoka. 19 officers were dispatched to work with Atami City officials and the Atami Police Station on July 18 to provide support in traffic duties and protection of restricted areas alongside the fire department and the Japanese Self-Defense Forces. After Typhoon Hagibis made landfall at Izu Peninsula in Shizuoka Prefecture, 13 SeRT officers were deployed to Suzaka, Nagano to provide assistance for waste disposal and provide facility security from October 19 to 23. From October 23, 14 SeRT officers were deployed to the city up to October 27.

On December 2, 2021, SeRT has publicly shown a Mazda CX-8 that would serve as a commander vehicle, equipped with red emergency lights, a front sensor, a radio and a loudspeaker microphone. It was previously delivered to the Ministry of Justice in November 2021.

On April 19, 2022, SeRT held an induction ceremony to welcome new officers into the unit.

In January 2024, SeRT officers were dispatched in search and rescue (SAR) operations at the Noto Peninsula after the earthquake.

== Organization ==
SeRT is composed of 56 officers, including the captain in charge. The unit consists of four platoons with twelve officers each.

It is based at the Tokyo Detention House.

On April 19, 2022, 58 officers are assigned to SeRT.

=== Tasks ===
SeRT is tasked with the following responsibilities:

1. Riots and other serious incidents such as prison breaks and attacks inside prisons, detention centers and juvenile training schools.
2. Anti-terrorist operations in and around prisons, detention centers and juvenile training schools under the Armed Attack Situation Response Law.
3. Dispatch to disaster areas for humanitarian operations, including the operation of emergency shelters.
4. Conduct disaster relief operations in correctional facilities after a tsunami or an earthquake under a scale intensity of six or higher.

=== Training ===
Training is conducted for new recruits in a SeRT platoon by dividing into sub-units consisting of the transportation/setup/shelter management unit, a rescue unit, a mobile security unit, and a firearms unit.

== Equipment ==
SeRT officers are equipped with unknown sidearms, tear gas, anti-riot shields and tear gas grenade launchers.

The unit also has the Mazda CX-8 as the commander's car.

== Gallery ==
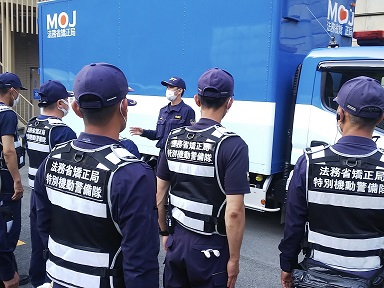
SeRT officers in a briefing prior to participating in humanitarian operations in Atami, Shizuoka after the landslides

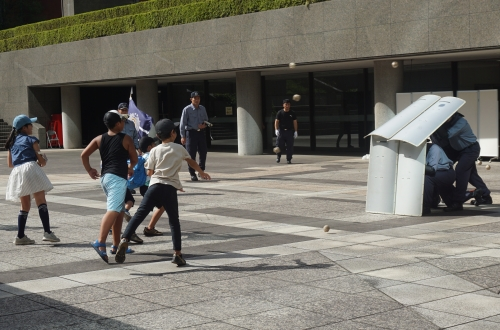
Kids throw fake stones at SeRT officers during an anti-riot demonstration.

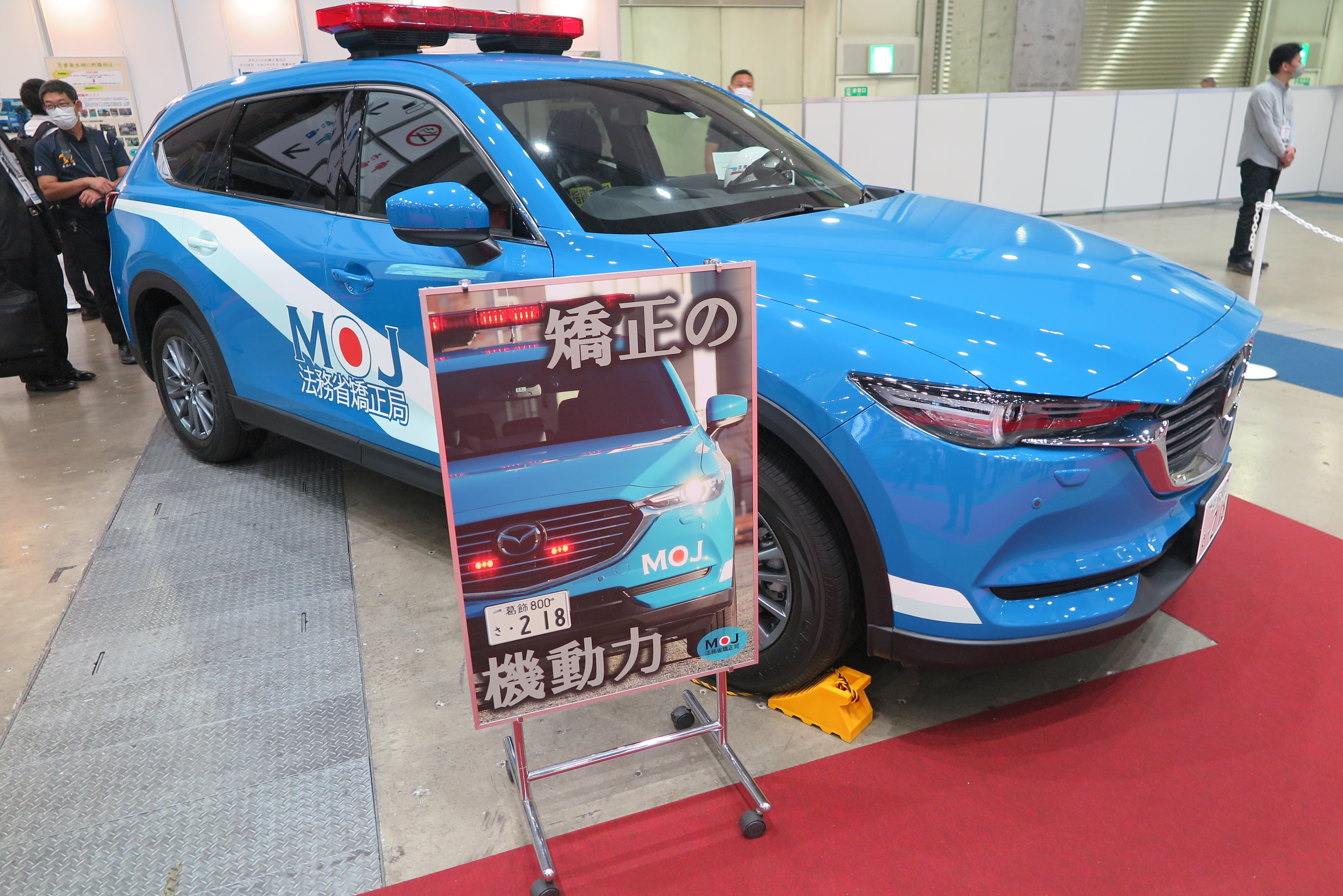
Mazda CX-8 as a Commander's vehicle

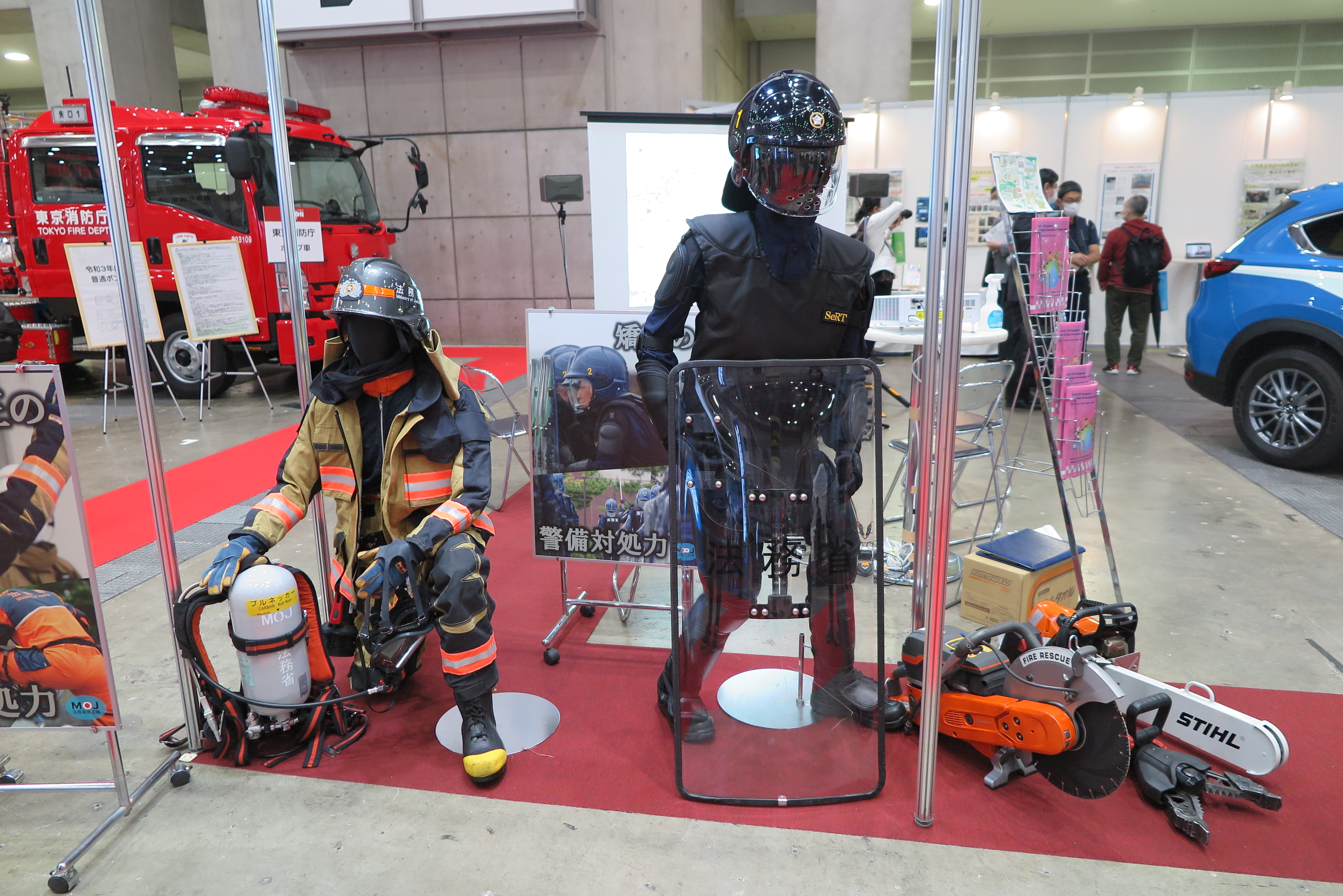
Personal equipment
