= Kenichi Hirose =

Aum Shinrikyo member and murderer

- 広瀬 健一
- Born: June 12, 1964; Shinjuku, Tokyo, Japan
- Died: July 26, 2018 (aged 54); Tokyo Detention House, Tokyo, Japan
- Known for: Tokyo subway sarin attack
- Status: Executed by hanging
- Convictions: Mass murder Terrorism
- Penalty: Death

Kenichi Hirose (広瀬 健一, Hirose Kenichi; June 12, 1964 – July 26, 2018) was a Japanese terrorist and member of the doomsday-cult group Aum Shinrikyo. He was later convicted and executed for murder during the Tokyo subway sarin attack.

== Early life ==
Born in 1964, Hirose was an outstanding student in his early years. In 1983, Hirose was admitted by Waseda University and chose applied physics as his major. In 1987, Hirose graduated from Waseda University as the best student in his grade and entered the Graduate School of Waseda University with a research topic on high-temperature superconductivity. Working with his supervisor, he published a paper in July 1987. His supervisor said Hirose was a gifted scientist. At the same time, Hirose began to wonder if the knowledge he learned in the university could help society.

== Joining Aum Shinrikyo and leading secret assault rifle production ==
In 1988, Hirose read books written by Shoko Asahara by accident. He was attracted by Asahara and began to correspond with Asahara. Per Asahara's request, in 1989, after graduating from graduate school and getting his master's degree, Hirose declined a job offered by NEC and joined Aum Shinrikyo, becoming an important person in this group. In the early 1990s, he produced around 1,000 assault rifles based on the AK-74. It was reported that Hirose once went to Russia to test these rifles.

== Tokyo subway gas attack, arrest, trial and execution ==
In 1995, Hirose took part in the Tokyo subway sarin attack. He was assigned to release sarin gas inside train A777 on Marunouchi Line. Hirose was arrested in the same year. In 2000, he was sentenced to death. In 2006, his appeal was dismissed. On July 26, 2018, Hirose was executed by hanging in the Tokyo Detention House.
