= Hiroaki Hidaka =

Japanese serial killer

- Hidaka's 1996 mugshot
- Born: 17 April 1962; Miyazaki, Japan
- Died: 25 December 2006 (aged 44); Hiroshima Detention Center, Japan
- Occupation: Taxi driver
- Children: 1
- Status: Executed by hanging
- Conviction: Murder (4 counts)
- Penalty: Death

Details
- Victims: 4
- Span of crimes: April 18 – September 14, 1996
- Country: Japan
- State: Hiroshima
- Date apprehended: September 21, 1996

Hiroaki Hidaka (日高 広明, Hidaka Hiroaki; 17 April 1962 – 25 December 2006) was a Japanese serial killer.

== Early life ==
Hidaka was born in the Miyazaki Prefecture. He was originally an excellent student, but he failed to enter the University of Tsukuba, his target college. He entered the Fukuoka University instead, but eventually dropped out. He often borrowed money, drank and went to prostitutes. In April 1989, he moved to Hiroshima and began to work as a taxi driver.

Hidaka married in 1991, and had a daughter in 1993, but his wife entered a mental hospital.

== Murders ==
Hidaka killed and robbed four women between April and September 1996. One of his victims was a 16-year-old girl who engaged in enjo-kōsai. He was arrested on 21 September 1996.

== Trial and execution ==
The district court in Hiroshima sentenced Hidaka to death on 9 February 2000, a sentence that he did not appeal. He was executed by hanging on 25 December 2006. After his execution, his lawyer, Shuichi Adachi, protested that he had been illegally refused access to his client by prison authorities.

== See also ==
- List of executions in Japan
- List of serial killers by country
