= Fukuoka family murder case =

2003 Japanese murder case

- Native name: 福岡一家4人殺害事件
- Date: June 20, 2003
- Location: Higashi-ku, Fukuoka, Japan
- Type: Robbery-murder
- Target: Matsumoto family
- Convicted: Wei Wei, Yang Ning, Wang Liang
- Convictions: Murder (x4); Robbery
- Sentence: Wei: Death (Executed 26 December 2019); Yang: Death (Executed 12 July 2005); Wang: Life imprisonment

The Fukuoka family murder case (福岡一家4人殺害事件, Fukuoka ikka yonin satsugai jiken) was a robbery-murder by Wei Wei (Chinese: 魏巍; pinyin: Wèi Wēi) and two other Chinese international students in the Higashi-ku ward of Fukuoka, Japan, on June 20, 2003.

In 2004, Judge Hiroshi Suyama indicted Wei Wei for murdering Shinjiro Matsumoto and his family.

The Japanese Minister of Justice Masako Mori confirmed Wei Wei's death warrant, and Wei was executed in 2019.

== Outline of the incident ==
On June 20, 2003, the bodies of Shinjiro Matsumoto (松本 真二郎, Matsumoto Shinjirō; age 41), his wife Chika (千加, age 40), and their two children (ages 8 and 11) were found in Hakata Bay handcuffed and weighed down with dumbbells. Shinjiro Matsumoto had been strangled with a tie, and Chika had been drowned in a bathtub. Their children had been otherwise strangled or smothered. Once the victims had been murdered, their bodies were transported by vehicle to Hakata Bay where they were discarded.

Three suspects were identified from witness testimony near the discovery site and surveillance camera footage from the store where the handcuffs and dumbbells used for the crime had been sold.

The first suspect, Wei Wei (魏巍), was a 24-year-old former language student in Japan. He was detained by police in another case. He pleaded guilty to four counts of murder but contended that he was not a central figure in the case and testified that the murder was the result of a plan to rob the family while they were at home.

The remaining two suspects, Yang Ning (simplified Chinese: 杨宁; traditional Chinese: 楊寧; pinyin: Yáng Níng, written in Japanese as 楊寧) and Wang Liang (Chinese: 王亮; pinyin: Wáng Liàng), were also students. They had fled to Mainland China after the murders and were arrested there.

The three assailants said, "I committed a crime for the purpose of robbery". Chika and Shinjiro ran a high-end restaurant, and Wang arrived by accident on the way to a part-time job. On seeing a Mercedes-Benz parked outside the restaurant, Wang thought that, "There must be a bank deposit of around tens of millions of yen in Matsumoto's house." However, there are doubts that robbery was the main motive in the case. On February 5, 2004, the Japanese daily newspaper Nishinippon Shimbun reported, "For the purpose of robbery, the amount of cash stolen was as small as about 40,000 yen, and there were many suspicious points, such as the fact that valuables such as cameras were left behind. Besides the three, there is a suspicion that an accomplice may have been present."

== Progress of criminal trials ==
=== Hearing by the Chinese side (Yang and Wang) ===
After fleeing Japan, Wang immediately started working, but drew the attention of police by "spending extravagantly" with money he had stolen. He was brought in for questioning and confessed to the murders, giving a detailed account of the crime, providing vital information which would lead to the arrest of Yang. Both men were formally taken into custody by Chinese authorities in August 2003, and indicted for murder in July 2004. On January 24, 2005, the Liaoyang Intermediate People's Court sentenced Yang to death and Wang to life imprisonment. Wang was spared execution due to his confession and cooperation with investigators. During the sentencing hearing, he kneeled down and apologized. Family members of the victims and many in the Japanese media condemned the life term as too lenient.

Yang was sentenced to death on February 3, 2005. His death sentence was confirmed by the Liaoning Superior People's Court after a ruling which dismissed the appeal. Yang was executed on July 12, 2005, at the age of 25.

Yang and Wang's criminal trial in China proceeded in step with Wei's trial in Japan, but the Chinese government did not respond officially to Wei's prosecution. Commentators in Japan compared sentencing and public opinion toward the accused.

=== Hearing by the Japanese side (Wei Wei) ===
Wei was indicted in Japan on March 23, 2004, by Judge Hiroshi Suyama of the Fukuoka District Court. The fact of prosecution was largely confirmed in the first trial, and on February 1, 2005, opening statements began regarding whether the Fukuoka District Public Prosecutors Office should seek the death penalty.

During the first trial on May 19, 2005, the Fukuoka District Court (Presiding Judge Kawaguchi) sentenced Wei to death. After accepting to hear Wei's case, the Court of Appeals broke with the District Court's silence, yielding detailed testimony on the motive, the criminal process, the role of the three assailants, and Wei's apology to the victims' bereaved family. On March 8, 2007, the Court of Appeals upheld the decision of the District Court in favor of the death sentence.

Wei's appeal to the Supreme Court was dismissed by the presiding judge, Isamu Shiraki (白木 勇, Shiraki Isamu), on October 20, 2011. The death sentence was finalized in the following month.

Approximately eight years and one month after Wei's death sentence was finalised, Minister of Justice Masako Mori issued an execution order for Wei on December 23, 2019. On December 26, he was executed at Fukuoka Detention House at the age of 40.

== See also ==
- Capital punishment in Japan
- List of executions in Japan
- List of major crimes in Japan
