= Hiroshima Detention House =

Correctional facility in Naka-ku, Hiroshima, Japan

Coordinates: 34.402049°N 132.4644352°E

Hiroshima Detention House

Hiroshima Detention House (広島拘置所, Hiroshima Kōchisho) is a correctional facility in Naka-ku, Hiroshima. A part of the penal system of Japan, it is operated by the Ministry of Justice. One of Japan's seven execution chambers is in this facility.

== Notable prisoners ==
- Hiroaki Hidaka, serial killer
- Yasuaki Uwabe, mass murderer
