= Nagoya Detention House =

Detention facility in Nagoya, Japan

Nagoya Detention House 名古屋拘置所 (Nagoya Kōchisho)
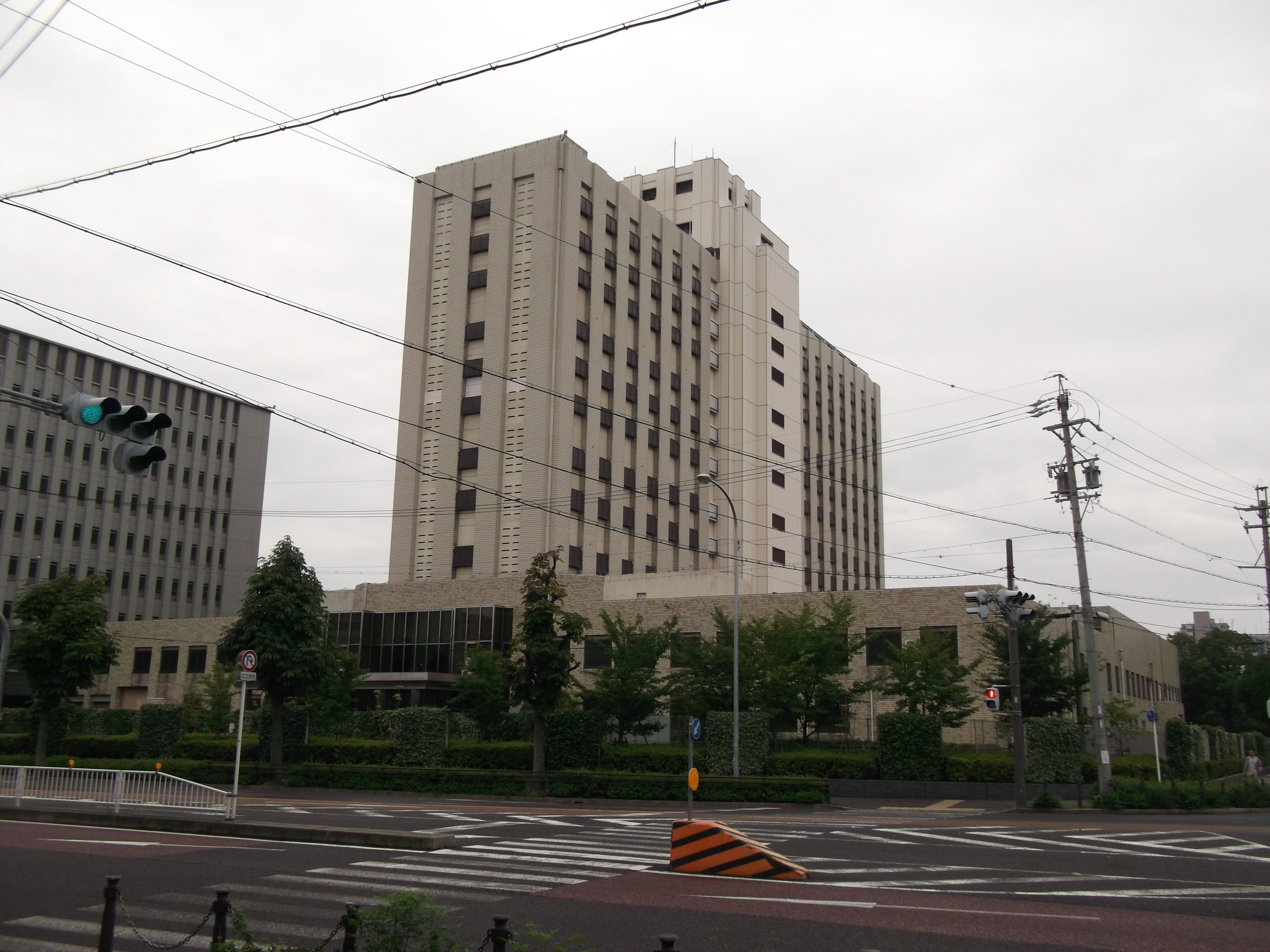
- Photo of Nagoya Detention House
- Interactive map of Nagoya Detention House 名古屋拘置所 (Nagoya Kōchisho)
- Location: Nagoya, Aichi Prefecture, Japan; 35°10′55.88″N 136°54′35.55″E
- Status: Operational
- Capacity: 1000
- Opened: 2 July 1938; 88 years ago
- Managed by: Ministry of Justice Corrections Bureau, Nagoya Regional Corrections Headquarters

Notable prisoners
- Tsukasa Kanda

Nagoya Detention House (名古屋拘置所, Nagoya Kōchisho) is a correctional facility in Higashi-ku, Nagoya. A part of the penal system of Japan, it is operated by the Ministry of Justice.

One of Japan's seven execution chambers is in this facility.

== Notable prisoners ==
- Kiyotaka Katsuta – Serial killer, executed in 2000.
- Tsukasa Kanda – Executed in 2015.
- Masato Yokoyama - Member of Aum Shinrikyo, executed in 2018.

.
