= Tokyo Detention House =

Building in Katsushika-ku, Tokyo, Japan

Coordinates: 35°45′31″N 139°49′03″E

Tokyo Detention House 東京拘置所
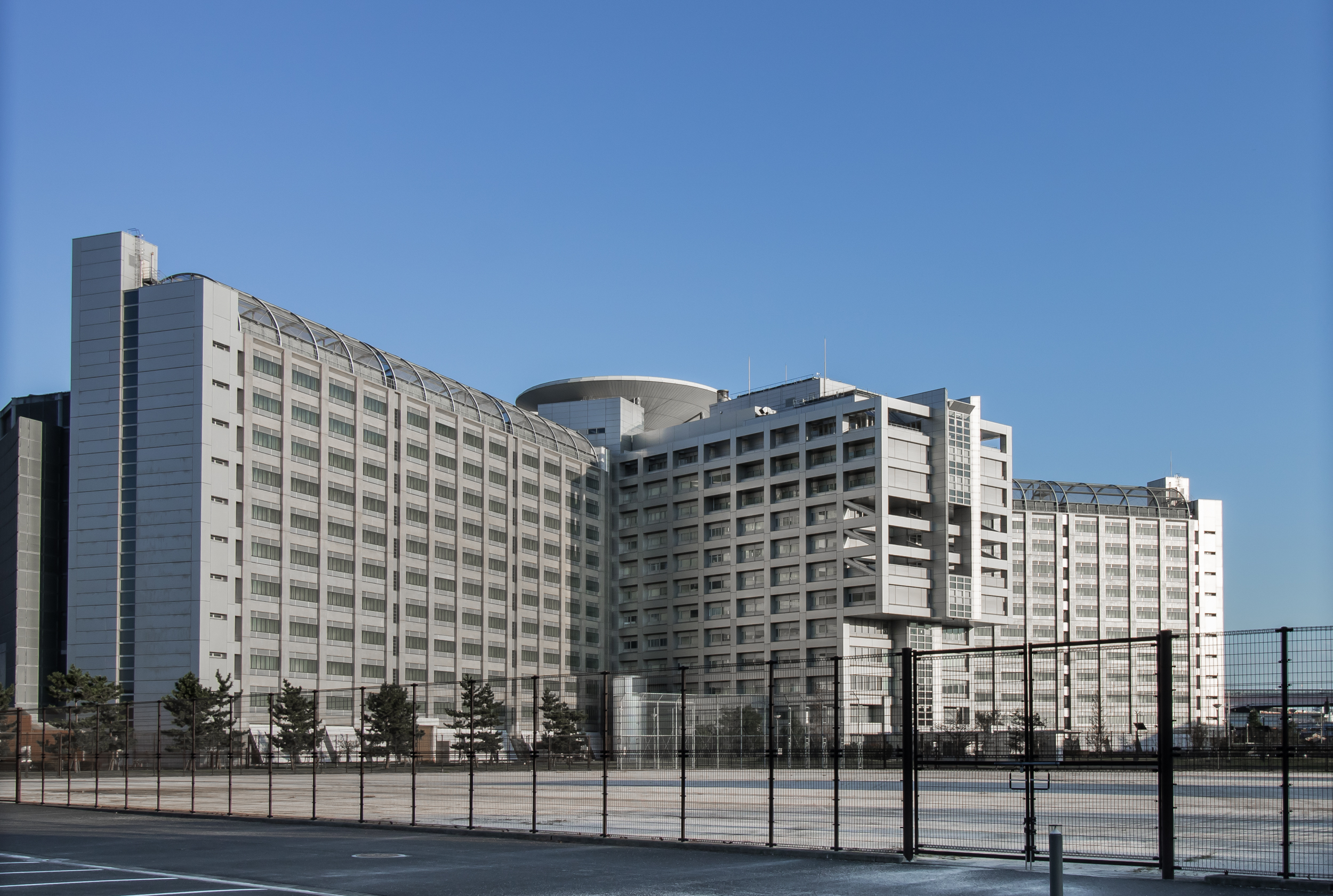
- Interactive map of Tokyo Detention House 東京拘置所
- Location: Katsushika, Tokyo, Japan 1-35-1
- Status: In operation
- Capacity: 3010
- Opened: 1895 (as Sugamo Prison); 1970 (Relocation)
- Managed by: Ministry of Justice (Japan), Tokyo correctional province

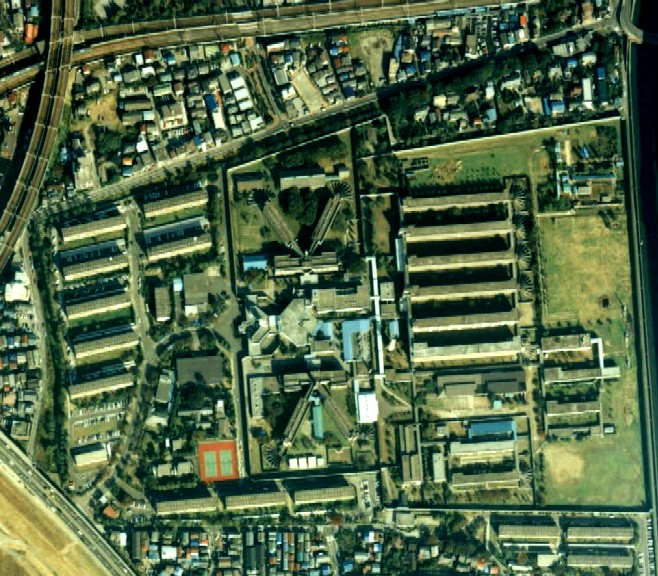
1989 aerial photograph of the correctional facility and its surroundings

The Tokyo Detention House (東京拘置所, Tōkyō Kōchisho) is a maximum security correctional facility in Katsushika, Tokyo. The prison, which is operated by the Ministry of Justice, is one of seven detention centres that carry out executions in Japan. It is used to detain people awaiting trial, convicted felons and those sentenced to death.

== History ==
First established and opened in 1895 as Japan's first independent pre-trial detention center as the "Sugamo Prison" in Ikebukuro, the Tokyo Detention House traces its origins to earlier prison operations dating back to 1879, featuring a distinctive asterisk-shaped structure designed for security and classification of inmates, back then known as the "Kosuge Prison". The prison was renamed "Sugamo Detention House" in May 1937, and would later become a primary site for detaining communists during World War II and later Class A war criminals. As of December 1963, Japan had a total of 58 prisons, 9 juvenile prisons, 7 detention centers, 9 prison branches, and 108 detention offices, with a capacity of 16,995 inmates. After being returned to Japanese administration in 1958, the prison was renamed Tokyo Detention House.

In 1970, the prison was relocated to the Kosuge area of Katsushika Ward, and the original site was demolished the following year. The original prison site was later redeveloped into the Sunshine City commercial complex. The Tokyo Detention House received renovations in 1997.

In April 2019, the Special Security Readiness Team, a tactical response unit, was established at the Tokyo Detention House.

== Execution chamber ==
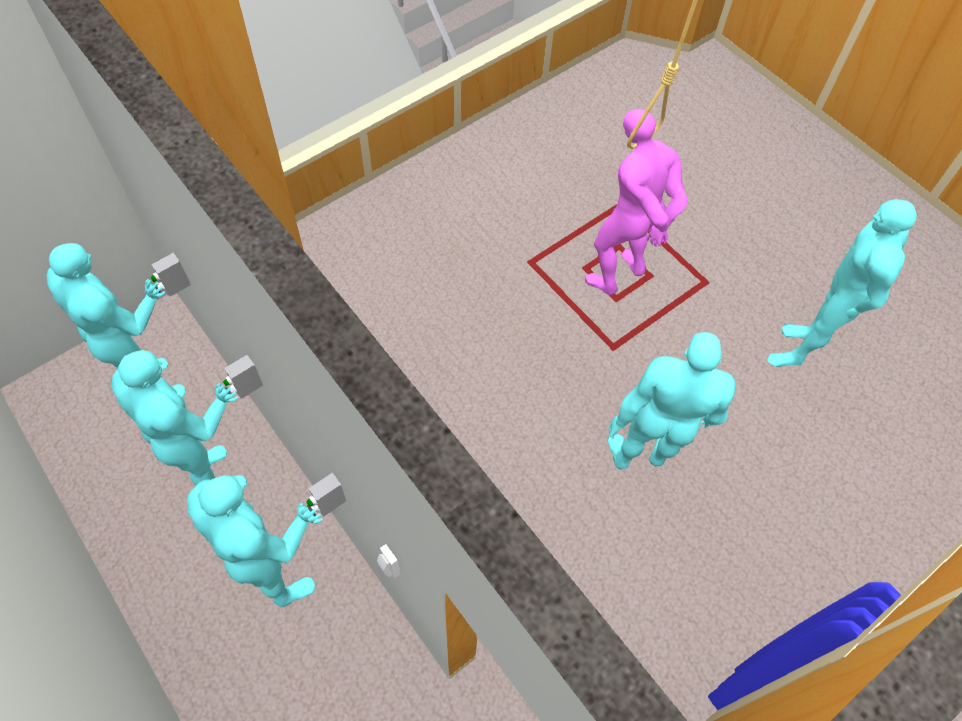
Diagram of the three-button execution method

One of Japan's seven execution chambers is in this facility. All executions in Japan are carried out by hanging. The execution chamber in Tokyo has a trap door, which is operated by one of the three buttons in the next-door room, which are simultaneously pressed by three prison staff members so that none of them will know who activated the drop.

Before entering the execution chamber, the condemned person passes a Buddhist statue of Kannon (観音), a bodhisattva associated with compassion. The execution chamber has two sections, with both of them together no larger than a 15-tatami mat room. When the execution happens, the body drops into a room below the execution chamber; it is in this room where death is confirmed.

== Notable prisoners ==
- Shoko Asahara (hanged 6 July 2018)
- Seiichi Endo (hanged 6 July 2018)
- Seiha Fujima (hanged 7 December 2007)
- Carlos Ghosn
- Kenichi Hirose (hanged 26 July 2018)
- Yoshio Iwamoto (hanged 27 August 2007)
- Masahiro Kanagawa (hanged 21 February 2013)
- Hideki Kanda (hanged 1 August 1997)
- Tomohiro Katō (hanged 26 July 2022)
- Kiyoshi Miki
- Tsutomu Miyazaki (hanged on 17 June 2008)
- Hiroko Nagata
- Hiroshi Sakaguchi
- Norio Nagayama (hanged 1 August 1997)
- Teruhiko Seki (hanged 19 December 2017)
- Yukio Seki (hanged 26 November 1993)
- Takahiro Shiraishi (hanged 27 June 2025)
- Koichi Shoji (hanged 2 August 2019)
- Richard Sorge
- Prime Minister Kakuei Tanaka
- Toru Toyoda (hanged 26 July 2018)
- Satoshi Uematsu
