= Fukuoka Detention House =

Correctional facility in Sawara-ku, Fukuoka, Japan

Coordinates: 33.58322°N 130.34483°E

Fukuoka Detention House (福岡拘置所, Fukuoka Kōchisho) is a prison in Sawara-ku, Fukuoka. A part of the penal system of Japan, it is operated by the Ministry of Justice.

One of Japan's seven execution chambers is in this facility.

== Notable prisoners ==
- Akira Nishiguchi (hanged 11 December 1970)
- Kiyohide Hayakawa (hanged 6 July 2018)
- Yasunori Suzuki (hanged 2 August 2019)
- Wei Wei (hanged 26 December 2019)
