= List of Japanese serial killers =

A serial killer is typically a person who kills three or more people, with the murders taking place over more than a month and including a significant period of time between them. The Federal Bureau of Investigation (FBI) defines serial murder as "a series of two or more murders, committed as separate events, usually, but not always, by one offender acting alone".

Serial killers have existed in Japan since ancient times, and Japan has the fourth highest number of serial killers in the world after the United States, the United Kingdom, and Russia.

== Pre-Empire of Japan serial killers ==
Below is a list of serial killers active before the formation of the Empire of Japan in 1889.

Name	Nickname	Years active	Proven victims	Possible victims	Fate	Notes	Ref.
Tokugawa Tadanaga	"Suruga Dainagon"	1626–1632	?	?	Executed 1634	Daimyo from Suruga who killed dozens of vassals. He may have suffered from schizophrenia. Legend has it that he cut up pregnant women and dismembered girls. Ordered by his older brother Tokugawa Iemitsu to commit seppuku for the crimes of theriocide, homicide and misconduct. Executed by seppuku in 1633.	
Aochababa	"Aochababa"	1771 and earlier	10	10+	Executed 1771	Unnamed middle-aged woman from Kyoto who killed a large number of babies in baby farming. After being executed by decapitation at the Kozukappara execution grounds in 1771, her body was dissected for research purposes by Sugita Genpaku, Maeno Ryōtaku and Katsuragawa Hoshū.	
Saito Hiroemon	"Yaritsuki"	1806	7	7	Executed 1806	Thrill killer who killed 7 homeless and disabled people with a spear in Edo.	
Sadakichi Shimizu	"Pistol robber"	1882–1886	5	6	Executed 1887	First recorded Japanese serial killer. He robbed and murdered five people in Tokyo between 1882 and 1886 and was executed in 1887. The police officer who arrested him died in 1888 from wounds sustained in a struggle with him; executed in 1887.	

== Empire of Japan serial killers ==
Below is a list of serial killers active before the formation of the State of Japan in 1947.

Name	Nickname	Years active	Proven victims	Possible victims	Fate	Notes	Ref.
Shige Sakakura		1898–1913	10	200+	Executed 1915	Baby farmer from Hioki Wakasa (present-day Nagoya) who suspicions arose that murdered hundreds of infants with two accomplices. Sentenced to death for ten murders. Sentenced to death and hanged in September 1915.	
Katsutaro Baba	"Katsutaro the Liver Harvester"	1905–1907	6	6	Executed 1908	Strangled and mutilated five women and one infant in present-day Tatsuno from 1905 to 1907, stealing their gallbladders post-mortem; executed in 1908.	
Ryuun Daimai	"The Nun Slayer"	1905–1915	5	5+	Executed 1916	Former monk who raped and killed at least five people in 1905 and 1915; executed in 1916.	
Satarō Fukiage		1906–1924	7	13–20+	Executed 1926	When he was 17 years old, he was arrested for raping and murdering a girl. He was later released and raped and murdered at least six additional girls. He was executed in 1926.	
Tokichi Ishii		1915	4	4	Executed 1918	Rapist who committed 40 robberies and rapes and killed four people, including a police officer. Executed in 1918.	
Ihachiro Nakashima	"Ihachiro the Devil"	1930	7	7+	Year of death unknown	Former police officer who strangled at least seven infants through baby farming. Sentenced to life imprisonment.	
Yoshio Kodaira		1932–1946	8	11+	Executed 1949	He was arrested for beating his wife's father-in-law to death with an iron rod in 1932. After his release, he raped more than 40 women and murdered at least seven people in Tochigi and Tokyo; executed in 1949.	
Seisaku Nakamura	"Hamamatsu Deaf Killer"	1938–1942	9	11	Executed 1943	Deaf boy who killed at least nine people; executed in 1943.	
Genzo Kurita	"The Second Kodaira"	1945–1952	7	17	Executed 1959	Necrophile who murdered least seven people in 1948 to 1952, Possible that he began committing murders in 1945.	
Miyuki Ishikawa	"Demon Midwife"	1946–1948	5	84–169	Released in 1956; died in 1987	Committed murders with accomplice Takeshi Ishikawa; Midwife who murdered five infants, but could have been up to 84, between 1946 and 1948.	
Takeshi Ishikawa		1946–1948	5	84–169	Released in 1954; Year of death unknown	Committed murders with accomplice Miyuki Ishikawa; Former police officer who murdered five infants, but could have been up to 84, between 1946 and 1948.	

== Japan serial killers ==
Name	Nickname	Years active	Proven victims	Possible victims	Fate	Notes	Ref.
Sokichi Furutani		1951–1965	8	12	Executed 1985	Robbed and murdered at least eight people; executed in 1985.	
Kau Kobayashi		1952–1960	3	3	Executed 1970	Poisoned her husband in 1952, and later killed an inn proprietor and his wife in 1960 with the help of her accomplice; executed in 1970.	
Sadame Sugimura		1960	3	3	Executed 1970	Fatally poisoned three women to steal their money in Kumamoto Prefecture from November to December 1960; executed in 1970.	
Tetsuyuki Morikawa		1962–1985	3	3	Executed 1999	Sentenced to life in prison for murdering his stepmother in 1962, released on parole. He killed two of his ex-wife's relatives after being released on parole; executed in 1999.	
Akira Nishiguchi		1963	5	5	Executed 1970	Fraudster who killed five people; executed in 1970.	
Akiyoshi Umekawa		1963–1979	5	5	Killed by police	At 15, he was arrested for stabbing a woman to death. After his release, he robbed a bank in 1979 and shot and killed four people. He was killed by police.	
Ryuichi Tsukamoto		1966–1967	3	3	Released on parole in the 1980s	Boy who strangled three women to death in Aichi, Chiba, and Yamanashi.	
Norio Nagayama	"The Shooter of Tear"	October 1968 - April 1969	4	4	Executed 1997	Teenager who shot to death four people using a stolen handgun in Tokyo, Kyoto, Hokkaidō and Aichi. Sentenced to death.	
Susumu Nakayama		1969–1998	3	3	Died in prison awaiting execution	Sentenced to life imprisonment for robbery and murder in 1969, but was later released and stabbed two people to death in 1998.	
Kiyoshi Ōkubo	"The Gunma Kodaira"	1971	8	8	Executed 1976	Russian-Japanese painter who strangled eight women aged 16 to 21 to death; executed in 1976.	
Kiyotaka Katsuta		1972–1983	8	22	Executed 2000	Firefighter who killed at least eight people; executed in 2000.	
Masakatsu Nishikawa		1974–1992	5	5	Executed 2017	At 18 years old, he stabbed a woman to death and was sentenced to prison. He killed four hostesses after being released and was executed in 2017.	
Takeshige Hamada		1978–1979	3	3	Died in prison awaiting execution	He killed three people for insurance money.	
Toshihiko Hasegawa		1979–1983	3	3	Executed 2001	Committed murders with accomplice Masamichi Ida, drowning or bludgeoning three people to death for insurance money. Executed in 2001.	
Masamichi Ida		1979–1983	3	3	Executed 1998	Committed murders with accomplice Toshihiko Hasegawa, drowning or bludgeoning three people to death for insurance money. Executed in 1998.	
Miyoko Sumida	"Piranha Grandma"	1984–2012	8	11+	Committed suicide in custody	As the leader of the serial-killing gang known as the Piranha Family she, along with accomplices, abused, tortured, and murdered at least eight people. Committed suicide after arrest.	
Yasutoshi Kamata	"The Osaka Ripper"	1985–1994	5	5	Executed 2016	Strangled and dismembered five women; executed in 2016.	
Tsutomu Miyazaki	"Otaku Murderer"	1988–1989	4	4	Executed 2008	Pedophile who strangled four girls to death and ate their bodies; executed in 2008.	
Yoshinori Ueda	"Osaka Dog Lover Murders"	1992	5	5	Sentenced to death	Poisoned five people with suxamethonium from July to October 1992 as part of a fraudulent scheme; sentenced to death.	
Shinichi Shimoyama		1993	3	3	Sentenced to death	Gang leader who robbed and killed three people in Shiga, Gunma, Tokyo with six accomplices. Sentenced to death.	
Gen Sekine	"Saitama Dog Lover Murders"	1993	4	7–30+	Died in prison awaiting execution	Committed murders with accomplice Hiroko Kazama by poisoning four customers. He burned their bones and bodies in drums, and dumped the ashes in forests and rivers. He boasted of 30 murders.	
Sachiko Eto	"The Drumstick Killer"	1994–1995	6	6	Executed 2012	Committed murders with accomplice Hiroshi Nemoto, Yuko Eto and Mitsuo Sekine. Cult leader who lynched and bludgeoned six people to death with a taiko stick.	
Hiroshi Nemoto		1994–1995	5 (Note: One murder case resulted in no indictment.)	6	Sentenced to life imprisonment	Committed murders with accomplicesSachiko Eto, Yuko Eto and Mitsuo Sekine. Cultist who lynched and bludgeoned six people to death with a taiko stick. Sentenced to life imprisonment.	
Yuko Eto		1994–1995	6	6	Sentenced to life imprisonment	Committed murders with accomplice Hiroshi Nemoto, Sachiko Eto and Mitsuo Sekine, Cultist who lynched and bludgeoned six people to death with a taiko stick. Sentenced to life imprisonment.	
Mitsuo Sekine		1994–1995	6	6	Released in 2020	Committed murders with accomplices Hiroshi Nemoto, Yuko Eto and Sachiko Eto. Cultist who lynched and bludgeoned six people to death with a taiko stick. Sentenced to 18 years imprisonment.	
Hiroaki Hidaka		1996	4	4	Executed 2006	Taxi driver who killed four prostitutes in Hiroshima in 1996; executed in 2006.	
Futoshi Matsunaga		1996–1998	7	9	Sentenced to death	Committed murders with accomplice Junko Ogata. He tortured and killed at least seven of his relatives.	
Junko Ogata		1996–1998	7	9	Sentenced to life imprisonment	Committed murders with accomplice Futoshi Matsunaga. He tortured and killed at least seven of his relatives.	
Yoshitomo Hori		1998–2007	3	3	Sentenced to death	Korean-Japanese who killed a couple in Hekinan in 1998, then aided in the murder of Rie Isogai in 2007; sentenced to death.	
Takashi Kitamura		2000–2004	5	5	Sentenced to death	Yakuza's son sentenced to prison for killing an 18-year-old boy by hitting him with a wooden sword and pushing him into an irrigation canal in 2000. After his release, he killed four family members along with his three family members.	
Yukio Yamaji		2000–2005	3	3	Executed 2009	Thrill killer who murdered his own mother in 2000, and then murdered a 27-year-old woman and her 19-year-old sister in 2005; executed in 2009.	
Shojiro Nishimoto		2004	4	4	Executed 2009	Killed a taxi driver and three elderly people during robberies to pay off his debts from January to September 2004; executed in 2009.	
Yasunori Suzuki		2004–2005	3	3	Executed 2019	Robbed and killed three women in Fukuoka Prefecture from 2004 to 2005; executed in 2019.	
Kanae Kijima	"The Konkatsu Killer"	2004–2009	3	7	Sentenced to death	Fraudster who poisoned at least three husbands.	
Hiroshi Maeue	"The Suicide Website Murderer"	2005	3	3	Executed 2009	Sadist who murdered three suicidal people; executed in 2009.	
Lee Masanori	"The Violent Device"	2005–2011	4	5–8+	Sentenced to life imprisonment	Convicted in 2018 of three murders and one manslaughter counts of murder committed as part of the "Piranha Family" gang.	
Kentaro Sumida		2005–2011	3	4+	Incarcerated	Convicted in 2015 of three murders counts of murder committed as part of the "Piranha Family" gang.	
Mieko Sumida		2005–2011	3	3+	Incarcerated	Convicted in 2015 of three murders counts of murder committed as part of the "Piranha Family" gang.	
Jeong Raitaro		2005–2011	3	6+	Incarcerated	Convicted in 2015 of three murders counts of murder committed as part of the "Piranha Family" gang.	
Rui Sumida		2005–2011	3	3+	Incarcerated	Convicted in 2016 of three murders counts of murder committed as part of the "Piranha Family" gang.	
Chisako Kakehi	"Black Widow"	2007–2013	3	10	Died in prison awaiting execution	She poisoned at least three of her husbands.	
Hayato Imai		2014	3	3+	Sentenced to death	Caregiver who caused at least three people to fall to their deaths at the nursing home where she worked.	
Takahiro Shiraishi	"The Twitter Killer"	2017	9	9	Executed 2025	Former scout man who lured eight suicidal people on Twitter (currently X) and strangled a total of nine people to death, including the victim's older brother; executed in 2025.	
Hiroki Kishinami	"The Grim Reaper"	2024-2025	4	4	Incarcerated	For the purpose of sex and theft, he assisted five young suicidal men in their suicides, resulting in the deaths of four of them. Sentenced to 5 years imprisonment.	

== Unidentified serial killers ==
Name	Years active	Proven victims	Possible victims	Region where active	Notes	Ref.
Tokyo Metropolitan Murders	1968–1974	10	10	Chiba, Saitama, Tokyo	An incident in which 10 people were burned to death by someone over a period of six years. The suspect, Etsuo Ono, was acquitted.	
Wednesday Strangler	1975–1989	7	7	Saga	Seven women were strangled to death in 1975 and 1989. The suspect was acquitted.	
North Kanto serial kidnappings and murders	1979–1996	4	5+	Tochigi, Gunma	At least four girls were kidnapped and murdered. The suspect was acquitted.	
Shinjuku–Kabukicho Love Hotel murders	1981	3	3	Tokyo	Four women were attacked, three of them strangled to death with pantyhose.	
Paraquat Killer	1985	13	13+	Hiroshima, Osaka, Mie, Fukui, Miyazaki, Wakayama, Saitama, Nara, Tokyo	At least 13 people have died after drinking poison-laced soft drinks.	

== Suspected serial killers ==
Name	Nickname	Years active	Proven victims	Possible victims	Fate	Notes	Ref.
Osaburo Noguchi		1902–1905	1	3	Executed 1908	Sentenced to death for the murder of a drug store owner. Accused of strangling a boy to death, eating his body, and poisoning his brother, but the charges were never brought against him.	
Chizuko Okamoto		1984-2005	1	5	Released in 2019	Sentenced to 12 years in prison for killing daughter in 2005. Four other bodies were found in her house, including two newborn babies, but no murder case could be established.	
Mamoru Takuma		1989-2001	8	10	Executed 2004	Mass Murderer who murdered eight children at school in 2001. He also caused two other car accidents between 1989 and 1993, but was never prosecuted because he lied about the cause of the accidents.	。
Shigeru Yagi		1989–1999	2	3	Died in prison awaiting execution	Poisoned two people with three accomplices between 1995 and 1999, and was suspected of having committed a poisoning in 1989.	
Joji Obara		1992–2000	2	2+	Sentenced to life imprisonment	Korean-Japanese rapist who raped at least ten people and killed at least two people. Most of the victims were white women.	
Miyuki Ueta		2004–2009	2	6	Died in prison awaiting execution	Killed a truck driver and two electronics store owners, and four other people around her died under suspicious circumstances.	
Yutaro Sumida		2005–2008	2	3+	Incarcerated	Convicted in 2015 of two counts of murder committed as part of the Piranha Familygang.	
Koji Nakashima		2008–2011	2	3+	Incarcerated	Convicted in 2015 of two counts of murder committed as part of the Piranha Familygang.	
Ayumi Kuboki		2016	3	20–48	Sentenced to life imprisonment	Nurse who poisoned at least three people over the course of several days.	

== Disputed cases ==
Name	Nickname	Years active	Proven victims	Possible victims	Fate	Notes	Ref.
Matsudaira Nobuyasu		1579 and earlier	?	?	Executed 1579	According to legend, he killed a monk because he had failed in a hunt, and killed the people of his territory for the trivial reason of not being good at the Bon festival dance. These legends are not confirmed in the materials of the time, but are recorded in later materials. It is believed that these legends were created to justify his execution.	
Toyotomi Hidetsugu	"Life-Killing Kanpaku"	1593-1595	?	?	Executed 1595	According to legend, shot to death a visually impaired person using a bow, shot to death farmers using a gun, cut up pregnant women, killed prisoners in a brutal manner in Kyoto, Fushimi, Osaka and Sakai, killed and dismembered chef for trivial reason, tortured and killed hundreds of people for sadistic pleasure and thrill. Boasted about these criminal acts, calling them the "Kanpaku Thousand-Person Slashings". Ordered by his uncle Toyotomi Hideyoshi to commit seppuku, executed by seppuku in 1595. These legends are not confirmed in the materials of the time, but are recorded in later materials. It is believed that these legends were created to justify his execution.	
Harada Kinu	"Yoarashi Okinu"	1872 and earlier	1	?	Executed 1872	According to folklore, she poisoned multiple people one after another, including her husband. In historical fact, she poisoned her husband to death in order to marry a Kabuki actor. Sentenced to death and beheaded on March 28, 1872.	
Takahashi Oden	"The Poisonous Woman"	1872–1876	1	2+	Executed 1879	According to folklore, she poisoned multiple people one after another, including her husband. In historical fact, she was accused of murdering his lover by slitting her throat with a razor. She was sentenced to death and beheaded on January 31, 1879.	
Masao Minamidate		1915–1920	0	7+	Released; Year of death unknown	Teenager who confessed to being the perpetrator of a familicide in 1915 and to having raped and murdered three girls by 1920. No confessions were obtained in any of the cases, and they were released shortly after their arrests.	
Etsuo Ono		1968–1996	1	11	Sentenced to life imprisonment	Suspect in the Tokyo Metropolitan Murders; Suspected of the killing by burning of 10 people between 1968 and 1974, but was acquitted in 1991. He committed a murder in 1996.	
Masumi Hayashi		1985–1998	4	5	Sentenced to death	Mass murderer who served curry laced with arsenous acid at a summer festival, injuring 63 people and killing four in 1998. Also suspected of having poisoned someone to death for the purpose of fraud in 1985.	
Hiroko Kazama	"Saitama Dog Lover Murders"	1993	3	4–7+	Sentenced to death	Committed murders with accomplice Gen Sekine by poisoning four customers. He burned their bones and bodies in drums, and dumped the ashes in forests and rivers. The defendant admitted to the charges of damaging and abandoning the body but pleaded not guilty to murder.	
Daisuke Mori		1999–2000	1	10+	Sentenced to life imprisonment	Nurse who was accused of killing at least 10 people at the hospital where she worked. Sentenced to life imprisonment for one count of murder and four counts of attempted murder and claims to be innocent.	

== See also ==
- List of major crimes in Japan
- Lists of serial killers
- List of serial killers by country
- List of serial killers by number of victims
