= Kau =

Kau or KAU may refer to:

== People ==
- Kau Kobayashi, Japanese serial killer
- Killer Kau, South African singer

== Places ==
- Kauhava Airfield, an airport in Kauhava, Finland (IATA airport code KAU)
- Kau River, Mizoram, India
- Kõue Manor or Kau, in Estonia
- Kaʻū, Hawaii, the southernmost district on the island of Hawaii
- Kaʻū Desert, Hawaii

== Abbreviations ==
- Karlstad University
- Kenya African Union
- Kerala Agricultural University
- King Abdulaziz University, Jeddah, Saudi Arabia
- Korea Aerospace University, Goyang, South Korea
- ISO 639:kau for Kanuri language

== Other ==
- Kau (bull), a legendary bull in Meitei mythology (India)
- Kau, an alternate name for Fungor language, Sudan
