= Ihachiro Nakashima =

Japanese baby farmer and serial killer

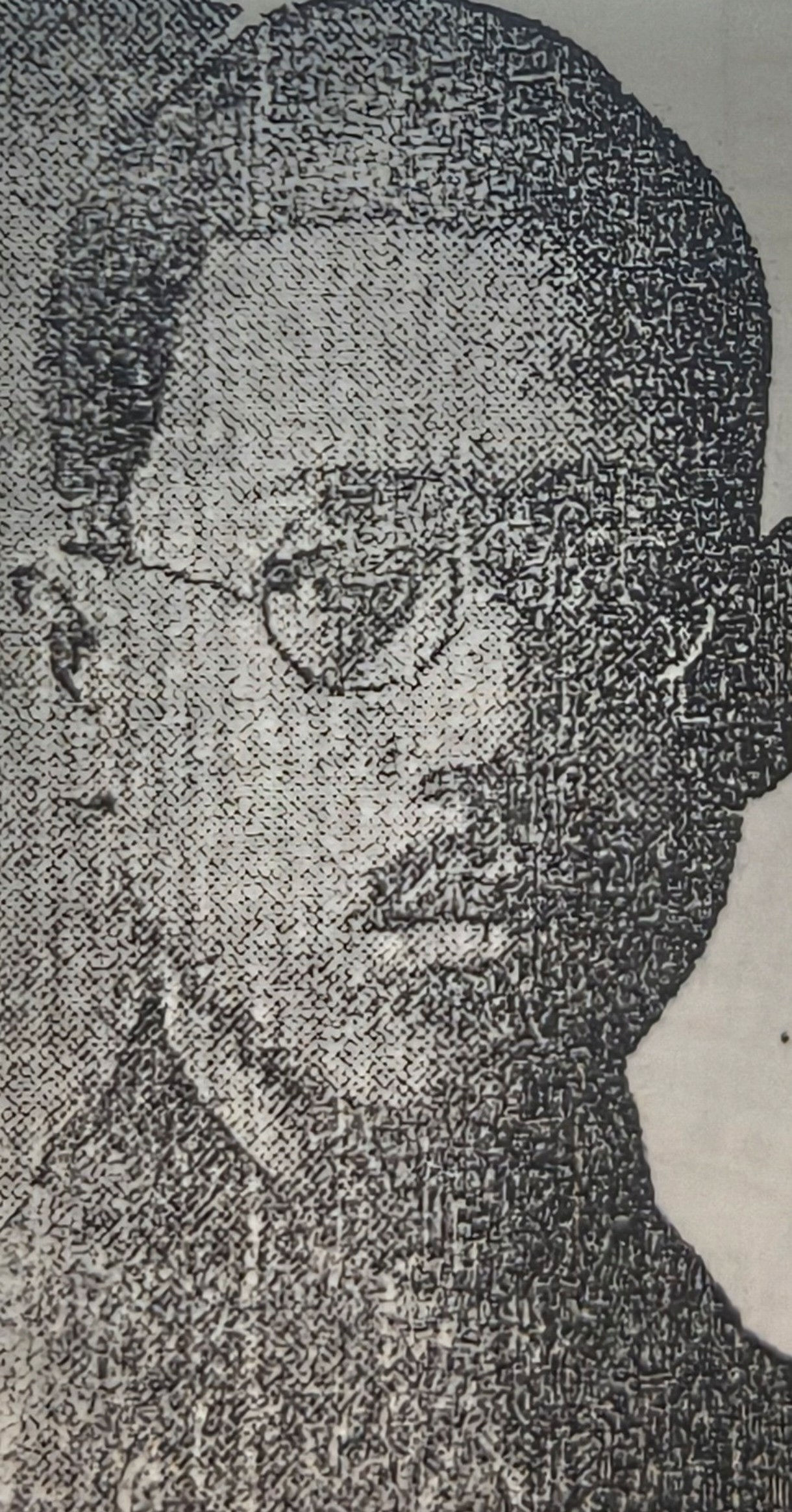
- Ihachiro Nakashima (from Tokyo Asahi Shimbun in June 1, 1930)
- Born: Around 1895; Japan
- Died: Unknown
- Other names: "Ihachiro The Devil", "Ihachiro The Demon"
- Motive: Fraudulent obtaining of child support
- Convictions: Murder, Abandonment of a corpse
- Penalty: Life in prison

Details
- Span of crimes: February 18 – May 15, 1930
- Country: Japan
- Killed: 7+
- Date apprehended: June 1, 1930

Ihachiro Nakashima (Japanese: 中島伊八郎, Hepburn: Nakashima Ihachiro; born c. 1895) was a Japanese baby farmer, serial killer and former police officer who murdered seven infants in his care from February 18 to May 15, 1930.

== Biography ==
Ihachiro Nakashima graduated from Kinjo Gakuen High School and Nihon University. After graduating from school, he moved to Korea and worked as a police officer in North Chungcheong Province. He brought his wife, Shizu, from his hometown in Kumamoto Prefecture and had two children with her; however, after one of them died, he sent his wife and the surviving child back home, resigned from the police force, and wandered through the region of Manchuria.

While living as a drifter, he entered into an intimate relationship with Koma Chikazaki (26) and fathered two children; however, after one of them died, he gave the other up for adoption to an acquaintance in Osaka. In 1926, he moved to Tokyo with Koma and lived with her in Kasumi-cho, Azabu. However, Ihachiro’s sexual appetite was excessive; Koma lost patience with him and disappeared from his life.

Meanwhile, Shizu frantically searched for Ihachirō; upon learning he was in Tokyo, she moved there to live with him. Ihachirō tried his hand at ventures such as the electric power business, but all of them ended in failure. Eventually, driven by a desire for child-rearing allowances, he set his sights on an adoption scheme advertised in the newspaper and began committing crimes.

== Crime ==
Around 10:00 PM on May 30, 1930, a woman who appeared to be in her late twenties arrived at Shinjuku Station, carrying a girl of about nine dressed in a sailor-style uniform and an infant wearing a knit hat. The woman got out of the car, said "I'm just going out for a bit, so please hold onto these for me," and handed over one large trunk and two oil cans to the baggage handler at Shinjuku Station. The woman handed over a piece of paper with "Yoshie Uchida, Koishikawa Ward" written on it and left, but never returned.

Before long, a stench of decomposition began to emanate from the luggage; suspicious, the baggage handler opened the items in the presence of a police officer from the station-front box. Inside the trunk, the bodies of three young girls were discovered, while two kerosene cans each contained the bodies of two individuals—bringing the total to seven bodies, believed to be newborn infants—and Shinjuku Station was plunged into panic.

The case was immediately reported to the court, and the police immediately suspected that the seven infants were victims of adoption fraud for the purpose of obtaining child support payments. They tracked down the person who had seen the newspaper advertisement for the adopted children and inquired with the person claiming to be Yoshie Uchida. The following day, Shizu Nakashima (30), who was using the name Yoshie Uchida, was arrested, and at the same time, her husband, Ihachiro (35), was also arrested on suspicion of abandoning a corpse. Upon his arrest, Ihachiro confessed to the murders, stating that he had committed each one while his wife was away; regarding the first incident, he wrapped the body in paper and hid it in the space above the ceiling of his home, later wrapping it in cloth and applying a scented preservative to suppress the odor once decomposition began to set in.

Some of the victims' parents, concerned about the children they had entrusted to Ihachirō as adoptees, visited his home and asked to see them; since Ihachirō had already killed the children by the time these inquiries were made, he would show them a different child instead, reassuring them by saying, "As you can see, the child is healthy." Furthermore, when his wife became suspicious about the disappearance of the child, he claimed to have handed the child over to a broker named Yamada who dealt in children for adoption. Ihachiro was sentenced to life imprisonment. Shizu was also suspected of involvement in the murder, but as she had no part in it whatsoever, the case against her was dismissed.

One week after the incident came to light, police officials, local notables, and the head priest of Joen-ji Temple collaborated to erect a set of Jizo statues known as the "Yodobashi Shichi-Jizo" (淀橋七地蔵) to mourn the seven infants who had lost their lives.

== Victims ==
| Number | Victim | Midwife | Sex | Child support | Date of Murder | Locations | Cause of Death |
|---|---|---|---|---|---|---|---|
| 1 | Baby | Michi Naoe | Female | 20 yen | February 18, 1930 | | Strangulation |
| 2 | Baby | Tae Yashiro | Female | 30 yen | February 25, 1930 | | Strangulation |
| 3 | Baby | Haru Kanemori | Female | 30 yen | March 9, 1930 | | Strangulation |
| 4 | Baby | Susa Naoi | Female | 100 yen | April 1, 1930 | Sawtooth oak forest | Strangulation |
| 5 | Baby | Michi Naoi | Female | 20 yen | April 20, 1930 | | Strangulation |
| 6 | Baby | Kiyo Kobayashi | Male | 30 yen | April 25, 1930 | | Strangulation |
| 7 | Baby | Mie Kobayashi | Male | 15 yen | May 14 or 15, 1930 | | Strangulation |

== See also ==
- List of Japanese serial killers
- List of serial killers by country
- Baby farming
- Miyuki Ishikawa
