= Shinichi Shimoyama =

Japanese fraudster, gangstar, robber and serial killer

Shinichi Shimoyamd
- Born: February 27, 1961 (age 65); Japan
- Status: Incarcerated in Tokyo Detention House
- Motive: Robbery
- Convictions: Robbery-murder (×3); Attempted Robbery-murder (×1); Robbery; Harm; Violation of firearm and Sword Possession Control Law
- Penalty: Death

Details
- Span of crimes: October 8 – December 20, 1993
- Country: Japan
- States: Shiga, Gunma, Tokyo and Shizuoka
- Killed: 3
- Injured: 1
- Weapons: Knife, Handgun, Hammer
- Date apprehended: March 1993

Shinichi Shimoyama (Japanese: 下山信一; born February 27, 1961) is a Japanese fraudster, gangster, robber and serial killer who together with Chinese-Malaysian accomplices Wong Yee sun (Chinese: 黄奕善; born December 14, 1968) and five accomplices, committed five robberies and killed three people in Shiga, Gunma, Tokyo and Shizuoka between October and December 1993. The crimes perpetrated by the Shimoyama's gang came to be known as the Serial robberies and murders incident by the Japanese press (Japanese: 日本・外国人集団連続強盗殺人事件) or Metropolitan Designated Case No. 121 (Japanese: 警察庁広域重要指定121号事件). Both men were convicted for their respective roles in the killings, and each was sentenced to death.

== Biography ==
Little is known about Shimoyama's upbringing. Shimoyama was born on February 27, 1961.

Even before committing the serial murders, he had repeatedly engaged in insurance fraud with several individuals who would later become his accomplices, swindling a total of 3,750,000 yen.

== Formation of a gang and murders ==
Shimoyama met Seishi Yoshida and Takashi Mori while incarcerated at Himeji Prison between March 1988 and November 1989, and formed a gang after his release. After forming the gang, Shimoyama recruited the Chinese-Malaysian assassin Wong Yee sun, introduced to him by his friend a gangster Toshio Yoda. Subsequently, Kunihiko Matsuzawa and Fumio Suzuki joined his gang, bringing the total number of members to seven. This gang committed five robberies and killed three people. Ultimately, all members of the gang were arrested between March and June 1994.

=== List of attacks by gang ===
Murder case

| Date of attack | Victim name | Weapon | Method of attack | Accomplice(s) | Amount and valuables stolen | Locations |
|---|---|---|---|---|---|---|
| October 8, 1993 | Unnamed two people | Knife | Threaten | Seishi Yoshida | 10,480,000 yen | Numazu, Shizuoka |
| October 27, 1993 | Yukio Oyama (53) | Knife | Stabbing | Seishi Yoshida, Takashi Mori, Wong Yee sun, Toshio Yoda | 1,600,000 yen, 12,400,000 yen in fireproof safe and Watch | Yōkaichi, Shiga |
| December 10, 1993 | Unknown (56) | Knife | Stabbing | Wong Yee sun, Fumio Suzuki, Kunihiko Matsuzawa | N/A | Adachi, Tokyo |
| December 12, 1993 | Unknown (40) | Handgun | Shooting | Wong Yee sun | 90,000 yen | Takasaki, Gunma |
| December 20, 1993 | Tadashi Kobayashi (59) | Hammer and Knife | Bludgeoning and Stabbing | Wong Yee sun, Fumio Suzuki | 1,500,000 yen in fireproof safe | Adachi, Tokyo |

== Sentence ==
Seven gang members were put on trial, and all of them were found guilty.

- Shinichi Shimoyama - Sentenced to death by three murders and robbery.
- Wong Yee sun - Sentenced to death by three murders and robbery.
- Fumio Suzuki - Sentenced to life sentence by one murder and attempted murder.
- Kunihiko Matsuzawa - Sentenced to 13 years imprisonment by attempted murder.
- Seishi Yoshida - Sentenced to life sentence by one murder and one robbery
- Toshio Yoda - Sentenced to 8 years imprisonment by one murder
- Takashi Mori - Sentenced to 12 years imprisonment by one murder

Wong Yee Sun, who had pleaded guilty, bowed and said 'Thank you very much' on hearing the sentence.

Shimoyama and Wong remain detained at the Tokyo Detention House, awaiting execution.

== See also ==
- William Bonin - American serial killer who committed murder and rape with four accomplices
- Chijon family - South Korean gang of serial killers and cannibal
- Dean Corll - American serial killer who committed murder and rape with two accomplices
- Desmond Domnique Jennings - American serial robber and killer
- Kiyotaka Katsuta - Japanese serial robber and killer
- Orlík killers Czech gang of serial kilers
- Piranha Family - Japanese gang of serial killers
- Snowtown murders - Australian gnag of serial killers
- List of Japanese serial killers
