= Hiroki Kishinami =

Japanese criminal

- Born: 1989 (age 36–37); Fukushima, Japan
- Other names: The Grim Reaper, The Guide to Death, The Suicide Maniac
- Motive: Sex and Greed
- Convictions: Assisted suicide, Attempted assisted suicide, Kidnapping of minors, Attempted commissioned murder, Theft
- Penalty: 5 years imprisonment

Details
- Victims: 4
- Span of crimes: June 10 or 12, 2024 – January, 2025
- Country: Japan
- States: Fukushima, Yamagata
- Target: Suicidal peoples
- Weapon: Briquette
- Date apprehended: January 31, 2025

Hiroki Kishinami (born around 1989) is a Japanese criminal, helped four suicidal people commit suicide.

== Biography ==
Hiroki Kishinami's date of birth is unknown, but he was born in Fukushima. According to testimony from nearby residents, he had no contact with society and tended to be a recluse. Kishinami's elementary school graduation album states that his favorite phrase is "Let's do our best until the end." His strengths were that he was knowledgeable and kind. When he entered junior high school, his kind personality suddenly changed, and he is said to have slandered his teacher at the time because of his poor math scores. He belonged to the tennis club in junior high school and went on to a high school near his parents' home, according to his classmates, who said he once worked at a pachinko parlor in the city.

== Crime ==
Kishinami's modus operandi was to pose as a suicidal person on social media, build relationships with victims, and assist them in committing suicide through carbon monoxide poisoning in abandoned villages and ruins. Kishinami assisted five suicidal people to commit suicide between May 2024 and January 2025, resulting in four deaths. He sometimes stole victims' cash cards and had sex with underage victims. After Kishinami assisted Girl's suicide, he sent a message to an acquaintance saying, "I'll never forget the smile you had just before closing the tent." At the trial, he apologized to the victim's family, saying, "Now I feel sorry for the person who committed suicide and the bereaved family," and "I don't know the grave of the deceased, and I don't think anyone will tell me, so I would like to light incense at a site I know." Kishinami was sentenced to 5 years imprisonment for helping five men and women commit suicide. There was an uproar on the internet, saying that the sentence was too lenient considering the lives of four people.

=== Victims ===
- He assisted the suicides of two people in Kitakata City, a man in his 20s from Miyagi Prefecture and a teenager from Saitama Prefecture in June 2024.
- He assisted a girl in committing suicide, but the attempt ended in failure in July.
- Corpse of a girl from Yamagata Prefecture was discovered in September.
- He helped a woman commit suicide in January 2025.

== See also ==
- William Melchert-Dinkel
- Takahiro Shiraishi
- Hiroshi Maeue
- Kenneth Law
- List of serial killers by country
- List of Japanese serial killers
