= Saito Hiroemon =

Japanese serial killer

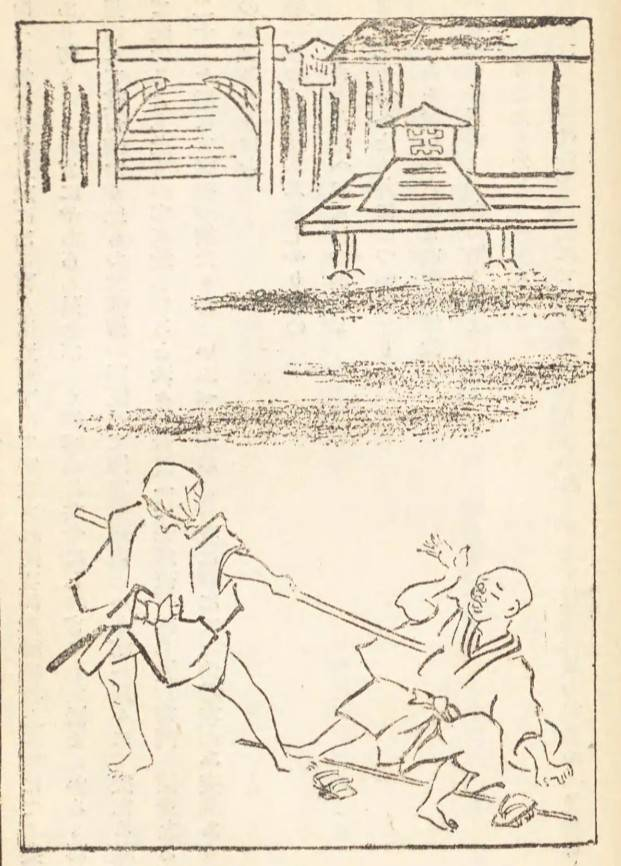
- Saito Hiroemon stabs a homeless with a spear.
- Born: 1768 or 1769; Tokugawa Shogunate
- Died: 24 April 1806 (aged 37); Suzugamori execution grounds, Edo, Tokugawa Shogunate
- Status: Executed by Decapitation
- Motive: Thrill, Sadism, Curiosity
- Conviction: Murder
- Penalty: Hikimawashi, death, and gokumon

Details
- Span of crimes: 21 January 21 – 6 March 1806
- Country: Tokugawa Shogunate
- State: Edo
- Targets: Homeless and Disableds
- Killed: 7
- Injured: 7
- Weapon: Spear
- Date apprehended: 18 April 1806

Saito Hiroemon (斎藤 広右衛門, Saitō Hirouemon; c. 1769 – 24 April 1806) was Japanese serial killer who perpetrated the so-called spear thrust attacks (槍突き) during the Edo period. Using a yari spear, Saito targeted homeless and disabled people in the streets of Edo between January and March 1806, killing seven and injuring seven others. He confessed to the crimes in April of the same year following arrest for an unrelated theft and was executed a week later.

== Biography ==
Little is known about Saito's upbringing. According to him, he served in a samurai residence and learned how to use a spear during that time. At the time of his execution, he was described as a 37-year-old foot soldier (Japanese: 徒士, romanized: kachi) for a daimyo.

== Crime ==
The attacks took place from 21 January to 6 March 1806. Since the beginning of February, the tokugawa shogunate has increased its vigilance, but incidents have continued one after another. From the beginning of March, a large-scale fire called the "Great Fire of Bunka" occurred around the same time, but the crimes continued. Saito's crime was characterized by the fact that there was no evidence that he stole money, and that his purpose was to kill someone.

On 18 April, he was arrested on suspicion of stealing two zukin clothing from a store. He was arrested and confessed to the incident, saying, "I wanted to stab a living person with a spear.". According to him, he developed a twisted curiosity after learning how to use a spear while working at a samurai residence. On 24 April, after being dragged through town as a shame display, he was executed by beheading, with the head displayed at the prison gate for public viewing afterwards.

=== Copycat crimes ===
After Saito's execution, people in Edo were able to walk around with peace of mind at night, but on the day of Saito's execution, another person was stabbed to death in Asakusa, and four days later, three people were killed or injured in Kagurazaka, one of whom was a 17-year-old blind masseuse, who was stabbed from the ribs to the back while returning from receiving medicine from a doctor for his suddenly ill mother. On 2 May, a blind man was stabbed to death in Ushigome. Similar incidents continued in November and December, including people being stabbed in Kagurazaka. These murders are not considered to be serial murders, but are believed to have been the work of multiple independent copycat killers. Machi-bugyō immediately began a search, but the culprit was never caught. In September of the following year, the former swordsmanship instructor was arrested and confessed to having committed crimes in 22 locations. the man died in prison.

== Victims ==
=== Murder victims ===
Number	Name	Status	Age	Date of Murder	Locations
1	Unknown	Homeless	40s	21 January 1806	
2	Unknown	Blind monk	60	23 January 1806	Kiridoshi, Yushima
3	Unknown		38-39	25 January 1806	Niōmon, Asakusa
4	Unknown	Visually impaired person	40	31 January 1806	Kaminarimon
5	Kyoan	Blind homeless	32	1 March 1806	Edomizaka
6	Chosuke	Freeloader	50	6 March 1806	Sanno-cho, Kōjimachi
7	Usuke	Doctor's apprentice	25	6 March 1806	Higashinaka-cho, Asakusa

=== Survivor ===
Number	Name	Status	Age	Date of Attack	Locations
1	Unknown	Blind Homeless		23 January 1806	
2	Tohachi		57	4 February 1806	Makiki
3	Ichisuke			16 February 1806	
4	Sabei	Servant		16 February 1806	
5	Unknown			Mid-February 1806	
6	Teishin	Homeless	26	27 February 1806	
7	Gesei	Blind Masseuse	45	6 March 1806	Kōjimachi

== In popular culture ==
=== Pop Culture ===
- Kido Okamoto "hanshichitorimonocho" 1986

=== Books ===
- Kato Ebian "Wagakoromo"
- Sudo Yoshizo "Fujiokaya Diary"
- Takizawa Bakin "Toen Shōsetsu"

== See also ==
- List of Japanese serial killers
- List of serial killers by country
- List of serial killers before 1900
- Tsujigiri
