= Tokyo Metropolitan Murders =

Unsolved serial murders in Japan

Details
- Victims: 10
- Span of crimes: 1968–1974
- Country: Japan
- States: Chiba, Saitama, Tokyo
- Date apprehended: Never apprehended

The Tokyo Metropolitan Murders refers to an unsolved series of murders of ten people between 1968 and 1974 in Japan's Greater Tokyo Area.

== Case overview ==
From 1968 to 1974, a series of murders and assaults against predominantly female victims occurred in the metropolitan areas of Chiba, Saitama, and Tokyo.

The modus operandi of the killer involved attacking and raping women living alone, who he killed at midnight and then burned their corpses. Most of the victims were in their twenties, with the perpetrator's blood type presumed to be O−. In total, 9 such cases were recorded, as well as another two in which a suspect had been convicted but later acquitted, that are thought to be linked to the series due to the similarities to the other crimes.

On September 12, 1974, a 37-year-old construction worker named Etsuo Ono was arrested in Kitaura (now part of Namegata) on suspicion of theft. He was taken to a police station in Matsudo, Chiba prefecture, where he was repeatedly grilled on his involvement in the killings due to his shady past:

1. Ono was a habitual recidivist who had spent a total of 13 years behind bars for various charges, including theft, burglary, causing grievous bodily harm, and arson.
2. Ono had been convicted of breaking into a Tokyo apartment and attempting to rape the sleeping occupant.
3. His blood type was O−, which is supposed to be the same as the unidentified killer's.
4. He was familiar with the areas in which the killings had taken place, as he had committed arsons in Matsudo and Ayase.
5. His alibi was dubious, as he claimed he had visited relatives or acquaintances at the time of the murders.
6. The criminal appeared to use a ladder to climb into the homes, and Ono was also known to use ladders to perpetrate his respective crimes.

Because of this circumstantial evidence, the media preemptively labeled Ono as the actual killer. Among the most notable headlines were "False genius, captive life" (Asahi Shimbun), "Habitual thief, calm liar" (Mainichi Shimbun), "A devil's face behind honesty" (Tokyo Times), and "The silly criminal Ono is the killer" (Tokyo Shimbun). There were also reports about an alleged victim identifying Ono as the attacker, as she had recognized him by his large penis. However, since there were cases in which the perpetrator's blood type wasn't O− and the targeted victims' age groups varied, speculations remained whether all 11 cases were actually connected or not. In one case, taking place in Katsushika, was later resolved and the killer identified as another man, not Ono as it was suspected.

In March 1975, Ono contacted the Relief Liaison Center for help with his conviction, claiming that he had never killed anyone. In response, Kensaburo Hasegawa established the Etsuo Ono Relief Society. According to Shun Nakajima (a pseudonym for journalist Kenichi Asano), the Chiba Prefectural Police and other journalists thoroughly investigated whether Ono's relatives and friends were burakumin, in an effort to prevent backlash similar to the preceding Sayama incident. It was later determined that no such relation ever existed.

According to Ono, he was threatened into signing a fake confession by the investigators, who had tortured him. He alleged that he had been pressed against the victim's corpse, face, and mortuary tablet in the interrogation room; was burned with incense and cigarettes; left with open windows during mid-winter; and had had his hair pulled out.

At the first trial in 1986, he was convicted and sentenced to life imprisonment, but at a later trial in 1991, his confession was put into question, and he was subsequently acquitted of the murder. Immediately after his release, Ono was regarded as a hero across the country.

== Murders ==
During the investigation, Ono's name was linked to the following crimes:

1. On July 13, 1968, a 26-year-old office lady was raped and burned to death at a vacant lot in Adachi. A few days after the incident, police received an anonymous phone call, proclaiming that Ono was the culprit, but he was never arrested due to lack of evidence.
2. On January 26, 1973, a 22-year-old office lady sleeping at her apartment in Kita was found strangled and her body burned. Two days after the murder, Ono was seen at a local bar within walking distance of the crime scene.
3. On February 13, 1973, an apartment in Suginami was set on fire. Its inhabitants, a 22-year-old man and a 67-year-old woman, were later found burned to death.
4. On June 25, 1974, a 30-year-old housewife living in Matsudo disappeared. Her strangled body was later found at a construction site on August 10.
5. On July 3, 1974, a 19-year-old woman went missing after visiting a Shinkin bank in Matsudo. Her body was later found at a land development site on August 8 (see below).
6. On July 10, 1974, a 21-year-old teacher was raped and burned to death in Matsudo. Ono was witnessed near the crime scene, and would later be charged with this murder.
7. On July 14, 1974, a 48-year-old restaurant owner and a 58-year-old store clerk were raped and their bodies burned in Katsushika. This is the only case where the true killer was arrested and convicted.
8. On July 24, 1974, a 22-year-old pharmacist was sexually assaulted and then burned at her apartment in Sōka. A station employee claimed to have witnessed a man resembling Ono on the first train at Sōka Station on the Tobu Isesaki Line. Moreover, just 23 days earlier, Ono had broken into a woman's apartment just opposite the crime scene, but managed to escape.
9. On August 6, 1974, a criminal broke into an office in Adachi, raping and burning the 24-year-old salarywoman who was present there. A man resembling Ono was seen fleeing from the area. In addition, it turned out that Ono had burgled that salarywoman's apartment a year prior.
10. On August 9, 1974, a 21-year-old woman was raped and then subsequently burned in her Shiki apartment. A later examination of DNA found at the crime scene indicated that the criminal's blood type was either A or AB. Due to this, it has been suggested that this might have been done by a copycat.

== Prosecution of Etsuo Ono ==
On July 3, 1974, a 19-year-old woman went missing from Matsudo after visiting a Shinkin bank, and her body was later found on August 8 at a land development site.

While Etsuo Ono was known to be in Adachi at the time, there was little evidence to necessitate an arrest. Witness testimonies were collected, and hundreds of potential suspects investigated.

Not long after, Ono was named as the prime suspect, due to his matching blood type and the fact that his footprints matched the ones found at the site of July 10 crime. On September 12, he was arrested, initially for theft, but later charged with the latter murder. After his arrest, the media labeled him as the one responsible for all the murders, despite being charged with a single case. The false reporting later fueled the sentiment of him being innocent.

Shortly after his arrest, Ono was released, as the prosecutor's office had insufficient evidence to hold him, but as Ono later confessed and indicated where he had stolen his victim's property, he was rearrested and charged with the Shinkin bank murder on March 12, 1975. At the same time as this indictment, prominent cultural figures such as Kenichi Asano, various religious officials, and lawyers from the Etsuo Ono Relief Society advocated for his release. Ono's defense counsel was Kenji Nozaki, whose defense strategy was to discredit his client's confession.

On September 4, 1986, the Matsudo branch of the Chiba District Court sentenced Etsuo Ono to life imprisonment. However, at the second trial on April 23, 1991, the Tokyo High Court acquitted him of the murder due to the unreliability of the confession. He was convicted of theft and rape, but got away with time served. He was freed after 16 years in remand, and was paid 36.5 million yen in compensation.

=== New murder and imprisonment ===
After his release from prison, Ono was regarded as a hero and victim of a miscarriage of justice. A year later, however, he was sentenced to a prison sentence for a theft committed in 1992. In 1996, shortly after his release, he was arrested yet again, this time for a murder committed in Adachi, where a woman had been burned and decapitated. Unlike the Matsudo case, the police had viable evidence to prove he was the perpetrator, resulting in Ono admitting his guilt and receiving a life sentence in 1999.

== Status ==
In total, only a single case of the Tokyo Metropolitan Murders has been resolved, with the 10 others remaining cold cases whose statute of limitations has expired.

Following Ono's murder conviction, there was renewed suspicion whether or not he was the real killer, with proponents of his guilt claiming his confession stated facts which only the perpetrator could know. However, it is disputed whether the confession is genuine or a forgery made in advance by law enforcement.

Ono's lawyer at the Matsudo trial, Nozaki, admitted later on that he had begun to suspect his client mid-trial, but was unable to say so as he would risk his career, and additionally confessed that his bar association later punished him for that.

Ono himself continues to proclaim his innocence in the serial murders. While the Matsudo case does not have a statute of limitations, he cannot be retried in it, due to the principle of non bis in idem.

== Bibliography ==
- 'Make-up of the Tokyo Metropolitan Murders' by Etsuo Ono (Shakai Hyoronsha) [in Japanese]
- 'Judiciary Murder - Distorted Death Penalty Asked by a Former Judge' Honoo Mori (Kodansha) [in Japanese]

== See also ==
- List of fugitives from justice who disappeared
- List of serial killers by country
- List of unsolved murders (1900–1979)
