= Kau River =

River in India

The Kau is a river in Mizoram, northeastern India.
