= Toshihiko Hasegawa and Masamichi Ida =

Executed Japanese serial killers

Toshihiko Hasegawa
- Born: 1950; Occupied Japan
- Died: December 27, 2001 (aged 51); Nagoya Detention House, Nagoya, Japan
- Status: Executed by hanging
- Motive: Financial gain
- Conviction: Murder (3 counts)
- Penalty: Death

Details
- Victims: 3
- Span of crimes: November 19, 1979 – December 25, 1983
- Country: Japan
- Locations: Aichi Prefecture; Kyoto Prefecture

Masamichi Ida
- Born: 1942; Empire of Japan
- Died: November 19, 1998 (aged 56); Nagoya Detention House, Nagoya, Japan
- Status: Executed by hanging
- Motive: Financial gain
- Conviction: Murder (3 counts)
- Penalty: Death

Details
- Victims: 3
- Span of crimes: November 19, 1979 – December 25, 1983
- Country: Japan
- Locations: Aichi Prefecture; Kyoto Prefecture

Toshihiko Hasegawa (1950 – December 27, 2001) and Masamichi Ida (1942 – November 19, 1998) were a pair of Japanese serial killers who conspired to kill three men to obtain life insurance money between November 1979 and December 1983 in Aichi Prefecture and Kyoto Prefecture. Both men were convicted of the murders, sentenced to death, and executed. While on death row, Hasegawa began writing letters to the brother of one of his victims, expressing remorse for what he had done. The two later met in prison, and he and two other relatives of Hasegawa's victims unsuccessfully petitioned the Minister of Justice to spare his life.

== Early life ==
Hasegawa had three siblings. He was married and had two children prior to the murders. He got divorced after the murders.

== Murders ==
In 1979, Hasegawa owned a car repair business in Aichi Prefecture. Ida was one of his employees. Hasegawa's business was struggling and he was in a large amount of debt. Hasegawa then devised a plan to pay the money he owed. He put out a life insurance policy on one of his customers, 20-year-old Teruyoshi Eguchi. Hasegawa and Ida then invited him to join them on a fishing trip. In the early hours of November 19, 1979, the two forced Eguchi overboard and left him to drown. However, when Hasegawa and Ida tried to cash in on the insurance policy, they were unsuccessful. Eguchi had been suicidal and coincidentally left a suicide note at his home. Consequently, the life insurance policy was rendered moot.

Hasegawa's business went bankrupt and he joined the trucking business as a subcontractor for a transportation company. In November 1982, Hasegawa hired 30-year-old Akio Harada as a driver. He then conspired with Ida and a third man to kill Akio, who had a life insurance policy of 20 million yen. On January 24, 1983, after watching Akio get into his truck, the third man followed him in another car. Ida stopped the truck at a planned location in Kyoto Prefecture and bludgeoned Akio to death with an iron bar.

Afterwards, Ida and the third man carried Akio's body back to the driver's seat of the truck. Ida then dropped the truck off a cliff and told the police that Akio had died in a traffic accident. Hasegawa, Ida, and the third man received a 20 million yen payout. The Harada family had deeply trusted Hasegawa and even lent him money. Akio's mother lent Hasegawa two million yen to pay for the truck. Masaharu Harada, Akio's older brother, lent Hasegawa 1.8 million yen since Akio had a loan with Hasegawa prior to his death.

Hasegawa still did not have enough money to pay his debts. He borrowed high interest money from a loan shark, 39-year-old Yoshio Sakakibara. To avoid having to pay the money back, Hasegawa conspired with Ida to kill him. The two beat him to death with a metal bar Handa, Aichi and stole his belongings. The two then went out to sea, tied an anchor to Sakakibara's body, and threw it overboard.

== Arrest, trial, and appeals ==
Hasegawa and Ida were arrested shortly after killing Sakakibara. The police soon discovered the two previous murders they had committed, and their accomplice in Harada's murder was also arrested. Hasegawa and Ida were both tried for three counts of murder, and their accomplice was tried for one count of murder. On December 2, 1985, Hasegawa, Ida, and their accomplice were all found guilty. Hasegawa and Ida were sentenced to death, while their accomplice received a prison sentence, presumably since death sentences in Japan are generally only handed out to people who have committed multiple murders.

Masaharu and his mother attended every day of the trials. Masaharu said he hoped his brother's killers would be executed and that he personally wanted to kill them himself. He said he was especially angry with Hasegawa since he and his mother had trusted him. Masaharu said Hasegawa had even taken them to the site of the "accident" and attended Akio's funeral.

Hasegawa and Ida were sent to Nagoya Detention House to await their executions. They lost their first round of appeals on March 31, 1987. After hearing of the decision, Hasegawa wrote a letter to Ida. Ida replied that he would be not making a second round of appeals, believing he deserved to die for what he had done.

Ida wrote "I feel that something has been completely removed after the judgment. I also feel that there is a hole in my heart. I have never felt it before. I myself feel that I will accept the judgment obediently. My lawyer and my family told me to appeal, but I'm not going to do it." Ida said he believed he owed it to the relatives of his victims to accept his fate and thought his death would serve as atonement for what he had done. He said he had given up and didn't have much of a will to live left anyway.

Hasegawa lost his final appeal to the Supreme Court of Japan on September 21, 1993.

== Hasegawa's correspondence with Masaharu Harada ==
In 1984, Hasegawa, who converted to Christianity while on death row, started writing letters to Masaharu, expressing remorse for what he had done. The first of the letters reached Masaharu in October 1984. For two years, Masaharu refused to open any of the letters and threw them all away. Eventually, however, he opened one and decided to reply. The two started to exchange letters. Hasegawa sent over 150 letters, as well as several religious drawings, which he said expressed his feelings of remorse.

In August 1993, Masaharu decided to visit Hasegawa in prison. He thought he might lose his temper upon seeing his brother's killer, but did not. Hasegawa told him he was grateful for the visit. He continued to express remorse and said he was ready to die now that he had seen Masaharu. Masaharu said he could not forgive Hasegawa for killing his brother and never would, but that his hate for him lessened. A month after the meeting, he petitioned for Hasegawa's sentence to be reduced to life in prison. Although only a convict's lawyers and relatives are allowed to visit them after a death sentence is finalized, Masaharu was allowed to meet Hasegawa three more times after he lost his final appeal.

In July 1994, Hasegawa's oldest son, who had visited him in prison committed suicide. His sister committed suicide shortly after. Masaharu attended the funeral of Hasegawa's oldest son and described it to him. The visits were stopped in August 1995, albeit Hasegawa and Masaharu continued to exchange letters.

== Final appeals and executions ==
On November 25, 1997, Hasegawa filed a clemency petition, asking for his death sentence to be commuted to life in prison. Harada also submitted a written statement, saying he wanted Hasegawa to live so he could spend the rest of his life in prison repenting. The petitions were denied.

Ida was executed on November 19, 1998. Hasegawa heard loud noises and asked the prison staff what was happening to Ida. When they gave an ambiguous answer, he became restless, since it was customary for death row inmates who were condemned for the same crime to be executed together.

In 2000, Hasegawa submitted another clemency petition. Masaharu, his mother, and the brother of Teruyoshi Eguchi also requested clemency. Masaharu said "I received numerous letters of apology, and had a chance to meet Hasegawa. I can never forgive him, but I think by living on he would be able to compensate for what he did. I want him to spend the rest of his life feeling the graveness of his sin."

Eguchi's brother said "I still have a lot of dreams. I dream of my brother's struggling face when he is killed by being pushed down by a ship into the sea by Hasegawa. Every time, my head gets confused. I panicked and I couldn't sleep because of my pain." He said he still thought dying was a worse fate for Hasegawa, but wanted him to "spend his life in atonement and prayer", and that his feelings about his brother's killer had changed over the years.

In July 2000, the petitions were denied. In September 2000, Hasegawa requested a new trial, claiming that Yoshida's murder was not financially motivated. On March 30, 2001, his request was denied.

In December 2001, Hasegawa had a feeling that he was about to be executed. He started writing several letters. He repeatedly apologized and bid his farewell, saying he hoped he could one day make amends. When Christmas Day came, Hasegawa said he was happy he got to see it one last time. He was executed two days later.

Harada attended Hasegawa's funeral. He later founded a group encouraging reconciliation between victims and offenders.

== See also ==
- List of executions in Japan
- List of serial killers by country
