= Yanagishima Familicide Incident =

Criminal case in Japan

Yanagishima Familicide Incident was a case of wrongful accusation in Japan and unsolved murders. The case became a major topic of discussion at the time after a suspect was sentenced to death—and later acquitted—following police torture and a coerced confession. In 1920, a boy was arrested and confessed to being a serial killer responsible for seven murders, including this one; however, the boy was never indicted.

== Yanagishima familicide ==
Bicycle merchant Yasohachi Okamoto, his wife Matsuno, and their daughters Kii and Tomi were found dead at their home in Yanagishima, Honjo, Tokyo. Valuables had been stolen from the scene, and blood was splattered all around, creating a gruesome spectacle. Also, during the time the crime was committed, two male servants—aged 18 and 14—were sleeping downstairs in the same house, but they were fast asleep and did not notice the incident. Suspicion fell upon the two servants, but it was quickly cleared.

== Heisaburo Hashimoto ==
Following the incident, the police focused their suspicions on a 26-year-old merchant Heisaburo Hashimoto（橋本平三郎）, noting that he had not returned home on the night of the incident and that he had business dealings with the victim, having asked the latter for financial assistance. Following his arrest on October 22, the Hashimoto was subjected to torture—including being beaten by police officers—and forced to confess. Death sentence was handed down to the Hashimoto on October 15, 1915. After the death sentence was handed down, the prosecutor in charge reviewed the case records and, struck by the absence of any clear physical evidence, summoned the Hashimoto to the interrogation room. However, the Hashimoto simply broke down in tears, and the questioning made no headway whatsoever. Consequently, the prosecutor took the Hashimoto to the scene of the crime, where the following contradictions came to light.

- Although the records state that the individual climbed over the wall of the victim's home, repeated tests confirmed that this was impossible for the Hashimoto, as he suffered from a congenital leg impairment.
- Four barges and twelve divers spent half a month searching the riverbed where the weapon was allegedly discarded, but it was not found.
- Furthermore, regarding Hashimoto's confession that he purchased the wood-splitting tool—alleged to be the murder weapon—at a street stall on March 29 (the day before the incident), testimony from the stall owner revealed that the stall had not been open that day due to rain and that there was no record of the sale in the ledger.

Due to these inconsistencies, the Tokyo Court of Appeal acquitted the Hashimoto on June 24 of the following year. Due to this case of wrongful conviction, the police faced fierce public criticism and a barrage of condemnation at the time.

== Masao Minamidate ==
Masao Minamidate
- Born: around 1900; Japan
- Conviction: N/A
- Penalty: N/A

Details
- Victims: 7+ claimed
- Span of crimes: 1915–1920
- Country: Japan
- Locations: Tokyo, Tochigi; Saitama, Ibaraki (claimed)
- Date apprehended: July 24, 1920

Five years after the incident, on July 24, 1920, Itabashi Police Station arrested a man, Masao Minamidate (20 years old at the time of his arrest/南館正夫), who was selling eggplants stolen from a field. Subsequently, as Minamidate writhed about while muttering in his sleep—"I’m the one who committed the Yanagishima quadruple murder; please forgive me, I’ll confess"—the station chief conducted an interrogation in the basement and pressed him on the Yanagishima case; Minamidate then admitted his guilt, saying, "I am truly sorry; I am indeed the culprit." When the police chief asked, "The Yanagishima incident happened five years ago, and you were 15 years old at the time, so is it possible that you could have done something like that?", the man replied, "Yes, it was me. Since then, I haven't felt truly alive. Please, give me the death penalty In addition to the Yanagishima incident, Minamidate confessed to other crimes: raping and stabbing to death a girl of about fifteen in Tochigi in April 1915; raping and strangling a girl of about fifteen in Tokyo in July 1916; and, on June 29, 1920, in Hachioji-machi, strangling a girl of approximately seventeen or eighteen, stealing her belongings, stuffing sand into her mouth, and throwing her body into the Arakawa River. None of these confessions led to formal charges, and Minamidate was released shortly after his arrest. Some books state that he was sentenced to death and hanged at the age of 22, but no primary sources have been found. The Yanagishima incident remains unsolved even after 17 years.

== Books ==
- Kaoru Murano 明治・大正・昭和・平成 事件・犯罪大事件 (2002年) 432Page ndldm:11896699

== See also ==
- List of unsolved murders (1900–1979)
- Setagaya family murder
