= Shinjuku–Kabukicho Love Hotel murders =

Three unsolved 1981 murders in Tokyo

Shinjuku Kabukicho Love Hotel murders
- Other names: Kabukicho Love Hotel Murders; Shinjuku Love Hotel Murders; Love Hotel Murders
- Years active: 1981

Details
- Victims: 3
- Country: Japan

The Shinjuku–Kabukicho Love Hotel murders are an unsolved series of murders committed in the Shinjuku and Kabukicho areas of Tokyo in 1981. The three victims, all women, were strangled in love hotels at night; two died at the scene and the third died later in hospital. The attacks stopped after a fourth victim survived.

== Murders ==
=== Hostess A ===
The first victim, known under the pseudonym of Hostess A, was last seen alive checking into room 401 of the New El Sky hotel with a young man on March 19, 1981. A day later, at about 10 a.m., there was no sign of the victim, who was supposed to have checked out of the hotel by that time. This caused an employee to enter her hotel room, where they found the victim strangled to death. An ID found on her identified her as a local 33-year-old hostess. However, her ID turned out to be fraudulent. She was actually a 45-year-old woman who abandoned her family in 1975 to live in Kabukicho. Authorities speculated that she might have worked as a prostitute prior to her death, and that the murderer may have picked her up from her cabaret job.

=== Hostess B ===
The second victim, known as Hostess B, was strangled to death with her pantyhose on the night of April 25, 1981. About an hour before her body was discovered, she was seen checking into room 203 of the Coca Palace hotel with a man. All of her clothes were missing except for her yukata. The murderer left behind a few insignificant items of the victim, such as her earrings, sandals, cigarettes, and a lighter.

The victim was estimated to be about 20 years old and 157 centimeters (5'1) tall. She was also believed to be Taiwanese. Due to the police being unable to identify her, they released a sketch of the victim to the public. However, this led to no results. The authorities believe that she may have lived in a rural area because she had clean lungs and unhealthy teeth.

=== Shoujo A ===
On June 14, 1981, the third victim, known under the alias of Shoujo A (少女A, "Girl A"), was last seen alive checking into a hotel room at the Higashioka hotel with a man. The man later walked out of the hotel alone and passed two employees on his way out of the building. The witnesses said that the man wore a suit. Because of the recent murders, the employees were suspicious of the man, and checked his hotel room. In the room, they found the victim with her hands and feet tied, and pantyhose wrapped around her neck. She was still alive when found, but later died in hospital.

The victim was later identified as a 17-year-old girl who lived in Kawaguchi city. During her autopsy, coffee was found in her stomach. This led authorities to believe that she met the murderer in a coffee shop.

=== Attempted murder ===
On June 25, 1981, a 30-year-old hostess in an arcade was invited by a man to a love hotel. After checking in to the hotel at about 11 p.m., the man began to strangle the woman. The woman fought back against her attacker, causing him to steal her wallet and run away.

== Similarities between murders ==
Police linked all of the murders and the attempted murder to the same unknown suspect due to the similar circumstances of the crimes. In all three murders, a stimulant was detected in the victims. No injection marks were found on the victims, so it is believed that they ingested the drug orally. It's also unknown whether the victims took the drugs forcefully or consensually. Additionally, the second and third victims were both strangled with their pantyhose, and the strangling method in the third and fourth cases was similar.

=== Suspect ===
The suspect was described by witnesses as a young, well-dressed man who is about 160 centimeters (5'2) tall. In the third and fourth incidents, he wore black-rimmed glasses, and had a round face. Despite being seen by multiple witnesses and the surviving victim, a composite sketch of the murderer was never made.

== Aftermath ==
The statute of limitations for the three murders expired successively between March and June 1996, meaning that even if a suspect were identified, no prosecution could proceed. After the murders, it became standard practice to install security cameras in love hotels. Additionally, the murders reinforced the perception that Kabukicho was a dangerous place.

In 2016, rumors spread in Japan that a fire broke out at a hotel where one of the victims was murdered, killing a woman in her sixties. The legend also states that two days after the first fire, another fire destroyed the hotel where another victim was murdered. These rumors were proven false after it was discovered that the hotels went out of business before 2016.

== See also ==
- List of serial killers by country
- List of unsolved murders (1980–1999)
