= Miyuki Ishikawa =

Japanese infanticide serial killer (1897–1987)

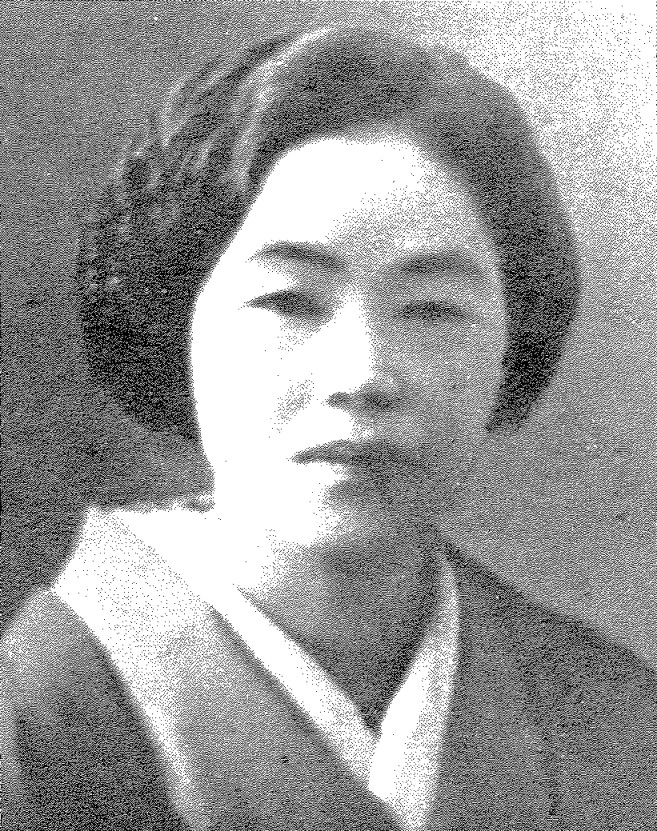
- Born: 5 February 1897; Honjō, Miyazaki Prefecture, Japan
- Died: 30 May 1987 (aged 90); Japan
- Penalty: 4 years in jail

Details
- Victims: Uncertain; 5 (Final Judgment); 27 (Indictment); 84 (Police Investigation) (Note: Although there was one more dead infant, it was not regarded as a viable victim due to its deformity.)
- Span of crimes: April 1946 – January 1948
- Country: Japan
- State: Tokyo
- Date apprehended: January 15, 1948

Miyuki Ishikawa (石川 ミユキ, Ishikawa Miyuki; 5 February 1897 – 30 May 1987) was a Japanese midwife, real estate agent and serial killer. During the US occupation of Japan, she and several accomplices are believed to have murdered dozens of infants, a crime spree known as the Kotobuki San'in incident.

== Early life ==
Miyuki Ishikawa (née Omaru or Komaru (小丸)) was born in the village of Honjō in Miyazaki Prefecture. In 1914, she moved to Tokyo, where she graduated from the Tokyo Imperial University as a midwife on 30 September 1919. That same year, she married Takeshi Ishikawa, three years her senior, originally from Ibaraki Prefecture. Takeshi, a former Kenpeitai sergeant and police officer, helped his wife's midwifery work without a regular job. Because Miyuki had had a hysterectomy, the marriage produced no biological children. Even so, the couple raised a boy from Takeshi's previous marriage and adopted three other children (two boys and one girl).

Miyuki was an experienced midwife, and managed a maternity home named Kotobuki San'in (寿産院 / 壽產院), holding some important positions of multiple midwives associations. In April 1947, she ran in the election of Shinjuku Ward's assembly members unsuccessfully.

== Infanticide ==
In the late 1940s, during the immediate postwar period, many babies were kept at Kotobuki San'in. Most of them were born out of wedlock, and their real mothers were too impoverished to properly raise their children. Due to a decrease in foster parents, Ishikawa chose to neglect numerous infants, many of whom died as a direct result. Almost all of the other midwives employed by Ishikawa were disgusted by this practice and resigned from their positions.

At the same time, Ishikawa also attempted to garner payment for these murders. She and Takeshi solicited large sums of money from the parents, claiming that it would be less than the expense of raising their unwanted children. Shirō Nakayama, a doctor, was also complicit in this scheme and aided the couple by falsifying death certificates. The number of infants listed at Kotobuki San'in and burial permits issued to the maternity home each year are charted below; (Note: The two infants, who were found alive but died quickly afterwards, are not included in the number of these burial permits.)

	1943	1944	1945	1946	1947	1948	Total
Infant List	8	24	34	40	100	5	211
Burial Permit	0	0	1	24	53	6	84

== Arrest and trial ==
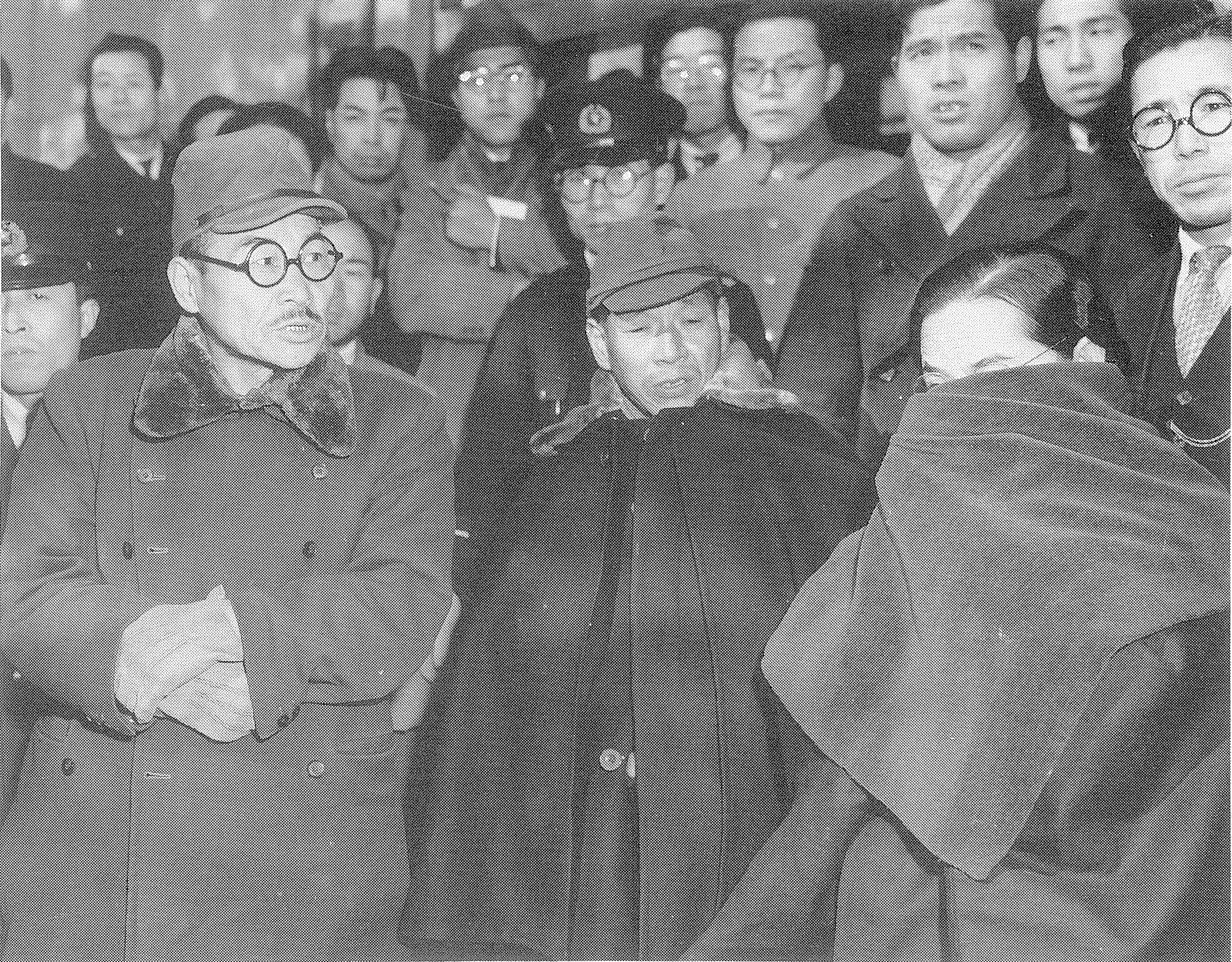
Miyuki Ishikawa (front right) and Takeshi Ishikawa (front left)

Two police officers from Waseda police station accidentally found the remains of five of Ishikawa's victims on 12 January 1948. Autopsies performed on these bodies proved that they had not died of natural causes. Ishikawa and her husband were arrested on 15 January. There were seven surviving infants at Kotobuki San'in at this point, but two died soon afterwards. Public Health and Welfare Section (PHW) at GHQ/SCAP and Tokyo-Kanagawa Military Government District (TKMGD) also dispatched some officers to the site.

Upon further investigation, the police found the ashes of over forty infants in the house of a mortician, and those of thirty more in a temple. The sheer number of dead bodies recovered and the length of time over which the murders took place made it difficult for the authorities to determine the exact number of victims. In court, prosecutors asserted that the couple had murdered at least twenty-seven infants among eighty-four deaths between April 1946 and January 1948.

On 11 October 1948, the Tokyo District Court found the couple guilty of five murders (including the two infants that were found alive but died quickly afterwards) by omission, and sentenced Ishikawa and her husband to eight and four years' imprisonment respectively. Both the couple and the prosecutors appealed the sentences by 16 October. On 28 April 1952, the Tokyo High Court sentenced Ishikawa to four years in prison and Takeshi to two years, granting pardons by effectuation of the Treaty of San Francisco. The Supreme Court of Japan rejected the second appeal on 15 September 1953.

== Social impact ==
Because the victims were deserted children, Ishikawa insisted that parents were responsible for their deaths. Some people, including Musei Tokugawa, supported the assertion. Yuriko Miyamoto and Michiko Fujiwara criticized them, however, saying it was an example of discrimination against deserted children. Moreover, it was revealed that the other eleven maternity homes in Tokyo had also committed crimes similar to Kotobuki San'in case by the end of 1948.

Several intellectuals, such as doctor Takashi Hayashi (林髞) (Takatarō Kigi (木々高太郎)) and politician Tamayo Miyagi, advocated that Japanese government should begin to consider the legalization of abortion in Japan in order to prevent recurrence of such incidents. On 13 July 1948, the Eugenic Protection Law (now the Mother's Body Protection Law) was established. On 24 June 1949, abortion for economic reasons was legalised under the Eugenic Protection Law in Japan.

== Aftermath ==
In 1969, Ishikawa was interviewed by Shūkan Shinchō magazine, claiming innocence in the murders. Following the end of her sentence, she began to work selling soap, cream and fish. At the time of the interview, Takeshi was already dead and Ishikawa was operating a real estate office in Tokyo, and she boasted about having built a big tomb for herself two years before. Her former lawyer imagined that she had earned about 100 million yen.

Ishikawa's name and address (same as Kotobuki San'in) were listed in telephone directories between 1954 and 1987. As well, her name was on the industry's lists as a representative of a real-estate agent named Asahi Shōji (朝日商事), whose address was also same as Kotobuki San'in, until the end of 1986. (Note: Five months after Ishikawa's death, National Association For Real Estate Transaction Guaranty (全国宅地建物取引業保証協会) requested someone qualified to come forward to get refund of three million yen, the deposit of her real estate business, on Kanpō.)

== Gallery ==
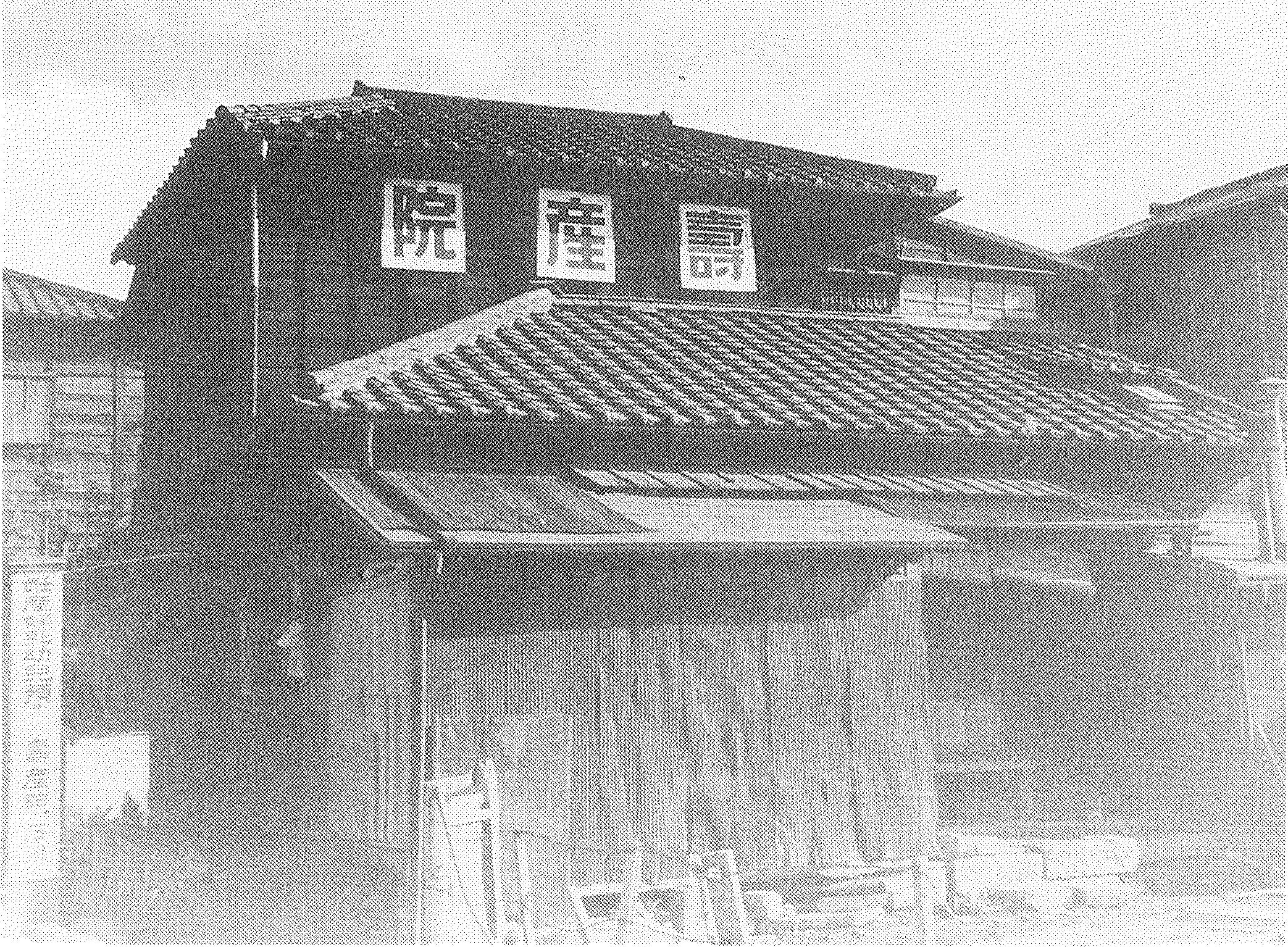
Kotobuki San'in

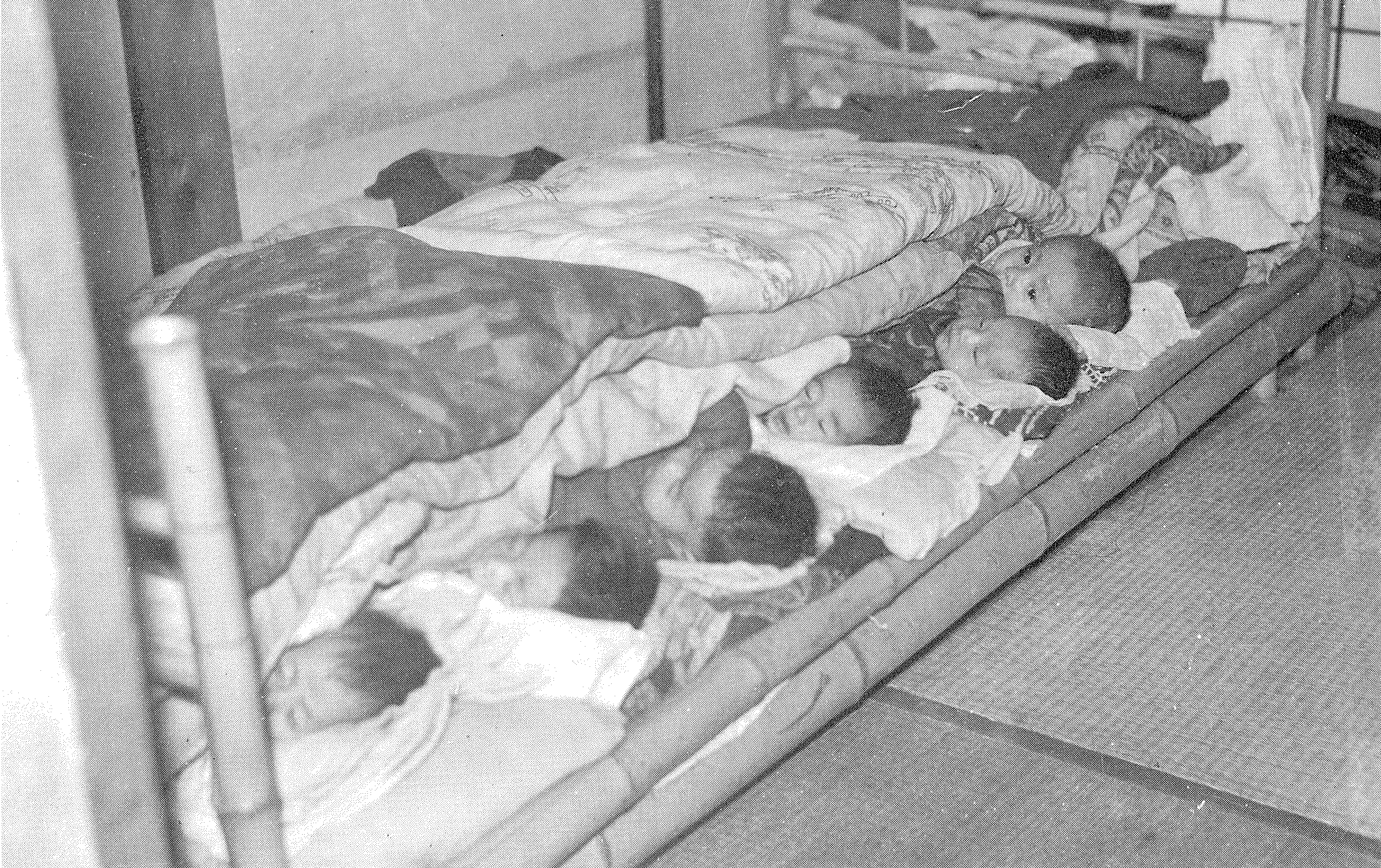
Surviving infants

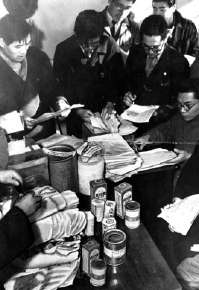
Confiscated goods

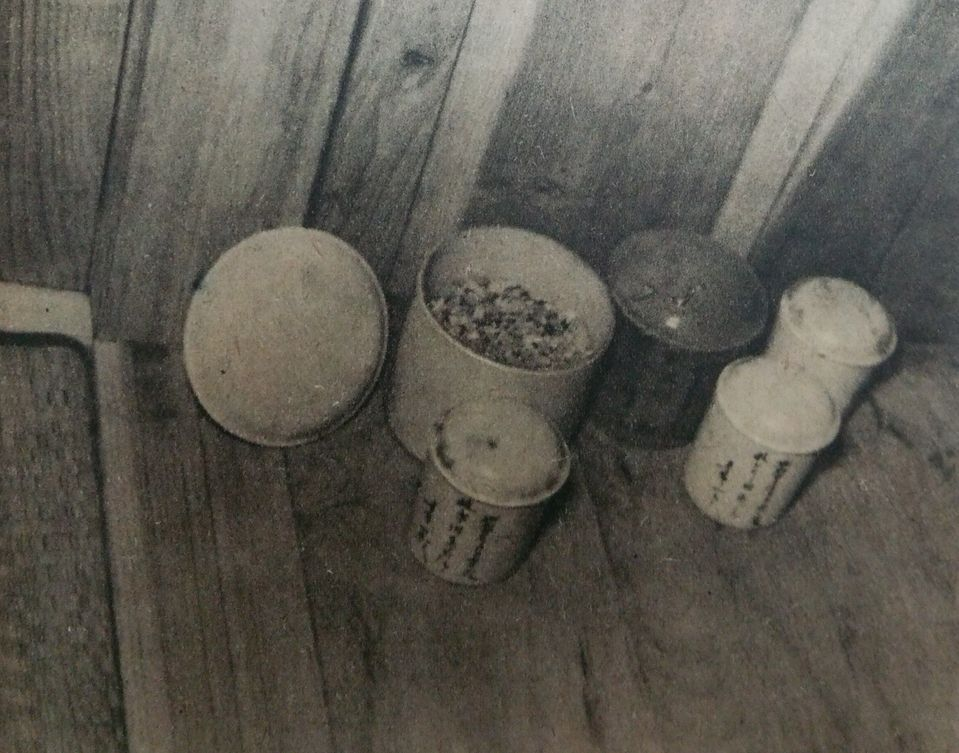
Ashes of an estimated dozen victims

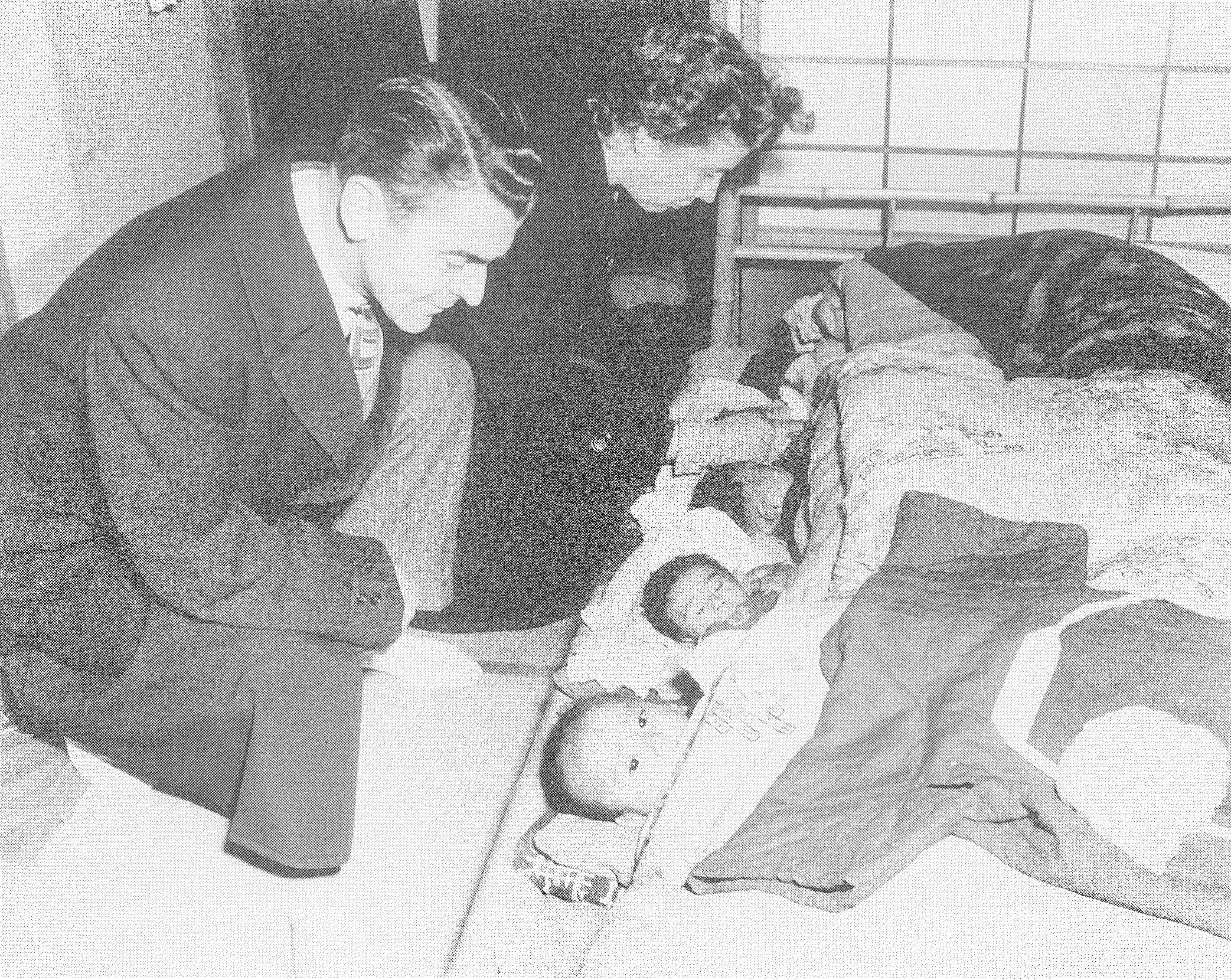
Inspection by PHW and TKMGD officers

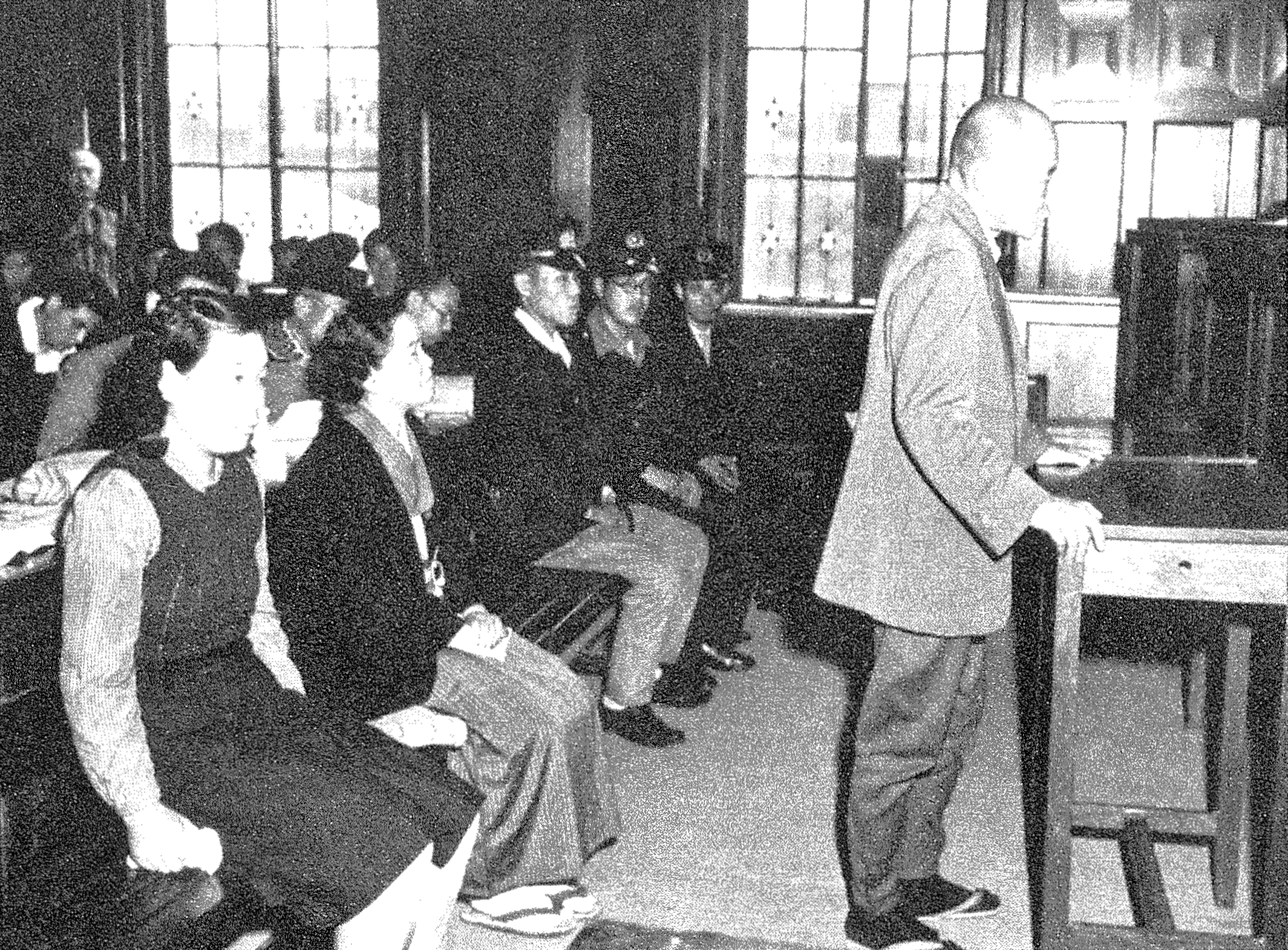
Trial

List of numbers of non-registered babies

Investigation report by PHW and TKMGD

== Remarks ==
- Some portraits of Yuriko Miyamoto are displayed as that of Miyuki Ishikawa wrongly at multiple websites.
- This incident was adapted into 2023 Korean cinema The Ghost Station.

== See also ==
- Serial killers with health related professions
- List of serial killers by country
- Amelia Dyer
- Minnie Dean
