= Tokichi Ishii =

Japanese serial killer

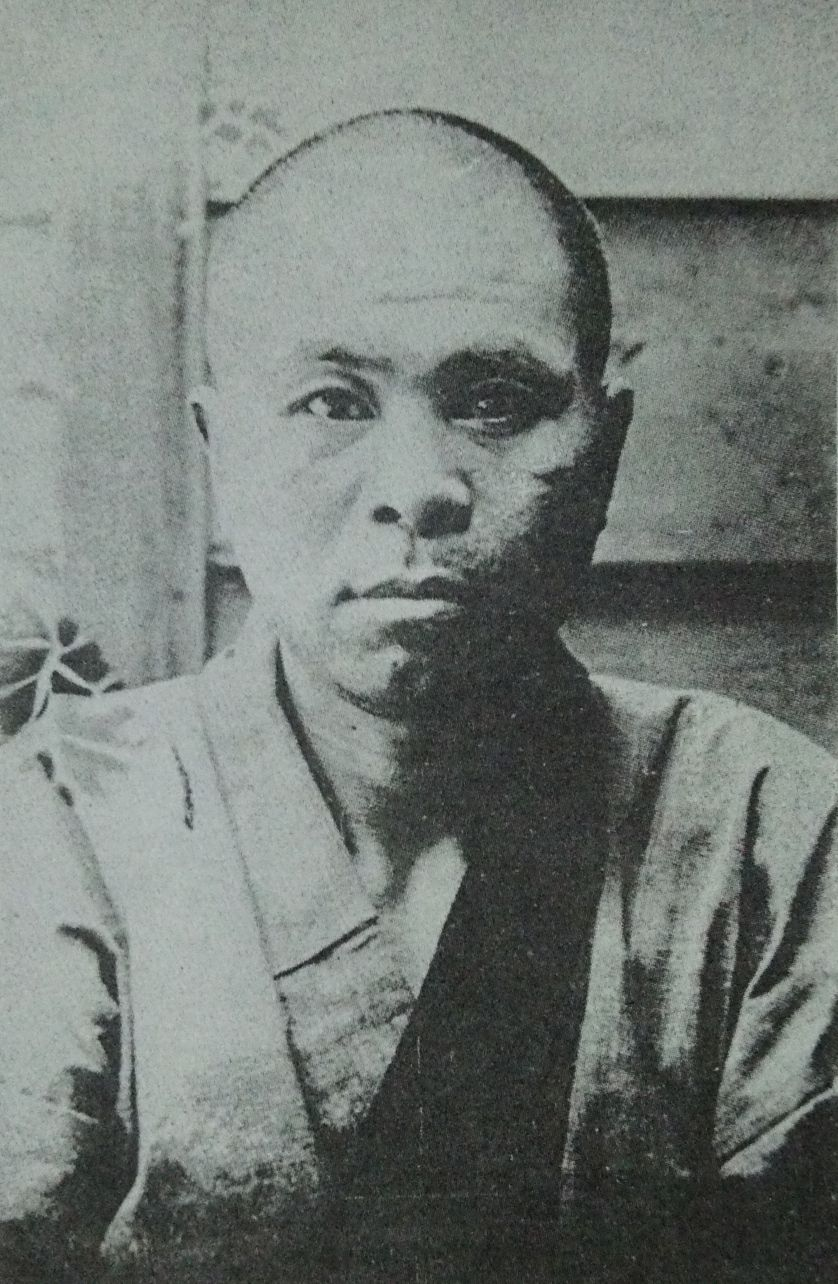

Tokichi Ishii (d. 1918) was a Japanese convicted serial killer and author. In 1915, he was sentenced to death for murdering four people: a couple, a police officer, and a woman. While on death row, Ishii converted to Christianity and wrote his confessions and memoir whose English title is A Gentleman in Prison.

== Crime ==
Ishii committed forty robberies, rapes, and four murders in Tokyo, Kanagawa, Shizuoka, Aichi, Osaka, Hyogo, etc.

- April 30, 1915: He strangled Haru Tanaka, 26, and gouged out her eyes and throat
- June 17, 1915: He strangled Yokohama couple Teiro Otsuki and Haru Kobayashi to death and stole their silver watch
- July 13, 1915: He killed a police officer who was chasing him during a robbery in Aichi Prefecture

== See also ==
- List of serial killers by country
