= Sadame Sugimura =

Executed Japanese serial killer

- Born: December 29, 1911; Japan
- Died: September 19, 1970 (aged 58); Fukuoka, Japan
- Cause of death: Execution by hanging
- Conviction: Murder (3 counts)
- Penalty: Death

Details
- Victims: 3
- Span of crimes: November – December 1960
- Country: Japan
- State: Kumamoto
- Date apprehended: December 29, 1960

Sadame Sugimura (杉村サダメ, Sugimura Sadame; December 29, 1911 – September 19, 1970) was a Japanese serial killer who poisoned four women in Kumamoto Prefecture between November and December 1960, killing three and crippling the fourth. For her crimes, she was sentenced to death and subsequently executed.

== Biography ==
Sugimura was born in December 1911. At the age of 19, she married a man named Noboru, a construction worker. The following year, she gave birth to a daughter. Their family life proved to be quite unhappy, as Noboru, a violent drunkard, eventually brought two mistresses with whom he had children to live in the household. If Sadame complained or brought up divorce, he would retaliate by beating her.

Due to the immense stress, Sadame fell ill with a sickness for which she later had to undergo an operation to remove her uterus. Around this time, her husband died from methanol poisoning. A year after his death, she fell in love with another man, a pesticide deliveryman who soon moved in with the family.

Despite the man's gentle and kind-hearted attitude, he was married and had two boys attending university, and unwilling to divorce his current wife, he continued sending money over to his family. According to one version of the story, Sugimura started killing her victims because she was desperate to pay off her debts. Another account, however, illustrates that Sadame, a habitual thief with a short temper, wasn't in dire need to repay her accrued debts amounting to 165,800 yen, but rather wanted to get the money to keep her newfound love.

== Murders ==
On November 6, 1960, Sadame was visited by her mother-in-law, Kura Sugimura. Knowing that the elderly woman always carried money on her, she laced her drink with parathion. On her way home, Kura collapsed in front of a neighbor's house and died on the spot. A doctor was called in to determine the cause, erroneously concluding that it was the result of a stroke. After rifling through her mother-in-law's handbag, Sugimura found only dirty underwear.

Despite her failed attempt to get money, Sugimura was emboldened by the fact that nobody noticed Kura had been poisoned and her body was later cremated. As a result, she picked out her next target: her 45-year-old neighbor, Kaetsu Takeshi, who was celebrating her son's recent marriage. Utilizing the fact that Takeshi loved eating horse meat, she poisoned a portion and brought it to her on December 14, under the guise of having a chat over some tea. Not long after eating the poisoned food, Takeshi began vomiting and writhing in pain.

She was rushed to the nearest hospital, where, while pretending to take care of her friend, Sugimura attempted to steal her wallet, but was caught in the act by the woman's son. In response, she is said to have thrown the wallet in his face and left. Not long after, Takeshi died, but her death was attributed to a stroke.

Three days later, Sugimura invited a merchant, Fujiko Yamamoto, to have a chat over some miso soup, which she had preemptively poisoned. After eating the soup, Yamamoto fell ill and was transferred to the hospital. She miraculously survived her injuries, as the parathion dose had been too small, but was left paralyzed for the rest of her life. By this time, local authorities were getting suspicious of Sugimura, who was said to have taken 13,500 yen from the injured victim, in addition to the fact that another two of her associates had died under suspicious circumstances.

On December 28, Sugimura invited 58-year-old clothing peddler Kiyono Okimura and her husband to visit her home. While the men were chatting and perusing over the Okimura couple's wares, Sugimura offered Kiyono a bowl of nattō. Not long after eating it, she began to vomit and writhe in pain. The shocked men immediately called the local doctor, but by the time he arrived, Okimura was already dead. Her cause of death was deemed to be from medullar bulbar palsy.

== Arrest, trial and execution ==
After learning of the Okimura woman's death, local authorities deemed it highly suspicious that yet another person affiliated with Sadame Sugimura had died due to "an illness". So, on the next day, Sugimura was detained at Japan National RailwayKawashiri Station and brought in for questioning. Despite her initial denial, when a second autopsy performed on the three murder victims revealed that they had been killed from eating poisoned food, which was located in Sugimura's house, she finally confessed to the crimes, admitting that her motive was financial.

Sugimura was charged with the four murders and subsequently convicted and sentenced to death on March 28, 1963. While on death row, she converted to Buddhism and provided spiritual counseling for her fellow inmates. On September 19, 1970, she was hanged at the Fukuoka Detention House, with her last words reportedly thanking God for "rebirthing her as a true human being". She was the second to be sentenced to death and executed after the Second World War, after fellow poisoner Kau Kobayashi.

== See also ==
- List of serial killers by country
- List of executions in Japan

== Bibliography ==
- Eric W. Hickey (January 19, 2015). Serial Murderers and Their Victims. Cengage Publishing. ISBN 978-1305446342.
