= Sadakichi Shimizu =

Japanese serial killer

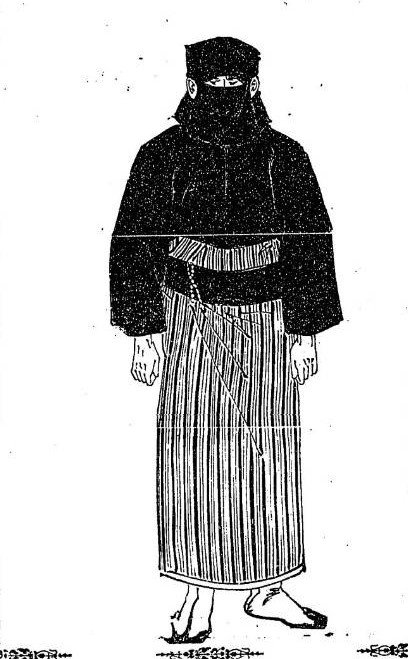
- Illustration of Shimizu from Sadakichi Shimizu: Detective True Story, 1893
- Born: August 13, 1837; Kiyoshima-cho, Asakusa, Edo, Tokugawa shogunate
- Died: September 1887 (aged 50); Tokyo City, Empire of Japan
- Cause of death: Execution by hanging
- Conviction: Murder x6
- Penalty: Death

Details
- Victims: 6
- Span of crimes: 1882–1886
- Country: Empire of Japan
- State: Tokyo
- Date apprehended: December 3, 1886

Sadakichi Shimizu (清水 定吉, Shimizu Sadakichi; August 13, 1837 – September 1887) was the first recorded Japanese serial killer, active during the Meiji era. Named the country's first 'pistol robber', his life was later adapted into the country's first drama movie, Armed Robber Shimizu Sadakichi (1899), and then the 1930 adaptation Sadakichi Shimizu.

== Biography ==
Shimizu was born on August 13, 1837, in Kiyoshima-cho, Asakusa, in Edo, during the Tenpō era (present-day Taitō, Tokyo).

By profession, he was an anma practitioner based in Tokyo City's Honjo-ku prefecture (present-day Ryōgoku in Sumida). At the time, his job served as good camouflage for his later crimes.

Beginning in 1882, he would mask himself and rob people around Tokyo City, killing five in the process by shooting them with a handgun. It was the first case in Japanese criminal history where a pistol was used, and it shook the capital at that time.

Immediately after breaking into a merchant's home in Bakurocho, Nihonbashi-ku (present-day Nihonbashikurocho in Chūō), he was arrested at dawn on December 3, 1886. At that time, one of the arresting officers, Ogawa, was shot and seriously injured, but managed to recover and was promoted to assistant police officer second class. However, his injury worsened four months later, and on April 26, 1887, he died at 24 years of age. In September of that year, the 50-year-old Shimizu was sentenced to death and subsequently executed.

In order to honor Officer Ogawa, a bridge crossing the Hamamachi River was named after him. It was eventually dismantled by city planning, but in 1974, a stone monument was erected on the anniversary of his death.

== Theater play ==
At the time, newspapers serialized the incident in the form of reading material. A shinpa play titled "The Pistol Robber Sadakichi Shimizu" was performed in 1897, which was attended by a 10-year-old Ton Satomi.

== Rōkyoku ==
The writer Iruru Masaoka noted in his book "History of Japanese Rōkyoku" that Shigemasa Kimura, a master of the art, once sang about the story of Shimizu.

== Movies ==
In 1899, while Koyō Komada was producing Japan's Initiative Photo Session, he created "The pistol robber Sadakichi Shimizu", a drama movie. This became the country's first feature film, and Unpei Yokoyama, who played Officer Ogawa, was recognized as the first popular movie actor. Later on, Kawai Film Production Co, Ltd. would remake the movie.

- "The pistol robber Sadakichi Shimizu" 1899 Director / Photographed by Yoshihiro Komada / Tsunekichi Shibata, Starring Unpei Yokoyama and Takashi Ichikawa
- "Sadakichi Shimizu" 1930 Director: Niji Oka, Starring Seisaburo Matsubayashi, Kikuko Tachibana and Hachiro Shizuka

== Books ==
- True Detective Stories: Sadakichi Shimizu, Anonymous, Kinsho-do, 1893
- Meiji/Taisho True Crime Stories Collection: Sadakichi Shimizu/Lightning Ladle, edited by Haruedo, 1929

== See also ==
- Cinema of Japan
- List of serial killers by country
