= Ryuun Daimai =

Japanese serial killer and rapist

Ryuun Oyone
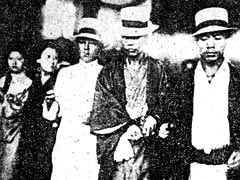
- Ryuun Oyone (second from the right) being escorted to Tokyo
- Born: Ryumoto Oyone; 1872; Asakusa, Tokyo, Japan
- Died: June 26, 1916 (aged 43–44); Tokyo Prison, Shinjuku, Tokyo, Japan
- Cause of death: Execution by hanging
- Other names: "The Nun Slayer" "Utchimitsu" "The Cannibl" "The Super Villain"
- Conviction: Murder
- Penalty: Death

Details
- Victims: 5+
- Span of crimes: 1905–1915
- Country: Japan
- States: Hyōgo, Kyoto, Tokyo, Kanagawa
- Date apprehended: August 8, 1915

Ryuun Oyone (né Ryumoto Oyone; 1872 – June 26, 1916) was a Japanese serial killer and rapist, active during the Taishō era. Since many of his victims were bhikkhunī, the media nicknamed him The Nun Slayer.

== Early life ==
According to the Tokyo Metropolitan Police Department, Ryumoto Oyone was born in Asakusa in 1872, the son of a pawnbroker. When he was 7 years old, he was sent to a temple in Ōita Prefecture to be taken care of by the abbot. He trained under his former name, later receiving the name "Ryuun". In 1890, the priest died, and Oyone left the temple to train judo at a dojo in Kumamoto Prefecture, as a uchi-deshi. During the First Sino-Japanese War, which broke out in 1894, he volunteered for the military, but got his nose disfigured due to sustained injuries from a land mine. He later set up a temple in Shimada, Shizuoka Prefecture, but eventually went out and began wandering around the country.

Not long after, numerous robberies and thefts were reported, with victims describing the assailant as a monk in torn robes. Eventually, Oyone was jailed for four years in the Anon Tsu Prison, in Mie Prefecture. On January 4, 1913, he was released.

== Crimes ==
Oyone's crimes following his imprisonment became increasingly cruel and brutal, invading nunneries to rape and rob the nuns, and in some cases kill them, setting the structures ablaze to hide his crimes. The judiciary recorded three robbery-murders, five rapes, seven robberies and nine thefts, but the actual number of rapes and murders remains unknown. Most of the rape victims were nuns, some of them average worshippers or miko, and others were affected regardless of age. It was reported that some of the victims, who screamed too loudly, had their tongues pulled out by hand and subsequently killed.

The main offences were as follows:

- In 1905, in Amagasaki, Hyōgo Prefecture, he killed a 72-year-old nun, stealing 24 yen.
- In April 1913, Oyone raped a 60-year-old nun in Odawara, Kanagawa Prefecture, stealing a savings bankbook and 200 yen. All of the yen was later spent at a red light district in Fukuhara, Kobe.
- In the summer of 1913, he quarrelled with a 26-year-old man in Kobe, killing him near a wharf.
- Later that year, he broke into a house in Fukuoka and raped a female restaurant manager. He later made that woman his concubine.
- In the summer of 1914, he moved to Tokyo, residing in a rented room in Kyobashi. There, he robbed the Namba Temple and adjacent places.
- On September 5, 1914, in Kyoto, he pulled out the tongue of a 58-year-old nun before killing her.
- On October 29, 1914, a 72-year-old nun was killed in Totsuka, Tokyo.
- On November 11, 1914, he snuck into Nunnera Temple in Kamakura, beat up the monk and fled with 20 yen and some clothing.
- On January 27, 1915, he killed a 21-year-old nun in Kamakura.
- On July 18, 1915, a 69-year-old nun was raped and robbed in Asagaya. Testimonies from other nuns described the suspect's age, height and peculiar disfigured nose.

It is said that Oyone managed to avoid arrest, despite committing crimes from Tokyo to Keihanshin, because he used different aliases. Police suspected that a different person had raped more than 40 nuns, and mistakenly arrested him instead.

== Arrest, trial and execution ==
Oyone was arrested on August 8, 1915, at Hakata Station in Fukuoka. At that time, a police officer received information that the suspect intended to fly to Kyushu under the assumed name of "Utchitsuma", and despite the severe resistance, managed to arrest him.

On May 22, 1916, the Tokyo District Court sentenced Ryuun Oyone to death, with telling the judge that "[he]'ll do it for you, because it's troublesome".

On June 26, 1916, he was executed in the Tokyo Prison (currently located in Shinjuku). According to contemporary accounts from the guards, he ate buns and drank tea, chewed nicotiana tabacum and was allowed to smoke. It was said that he had a dignified attitude, saying: "Because I couldn't smoke for a long time, I went crazy." While waiting for final moments on death row, guards attempted to make a blindfold that was "antidiarrheal Yai". His last purported words were supposedly "If I could be sentenced to death, I would like to die cleanly like this. Let's get it done".

== See also ==
- List of serial killers by country

== Bibliography ==
- Case and Crime Study Group (2002). Meiji, Taisho, Showa, Heisei Case and Crime Encyclopedia. Tokyo Law and Economics School. p. 110. ISBN 4-8089-4003-5.
- Hidaka, Kotaro (2008). The New Murder Encyclopedia Data File. Shinjinbutsuoraisha Co. Ltd. pp. 44–49. ISBN 978-4-404-03606-3.
- Goda, Kazumichi (2000). Study Group on Criminal History: Bizarre and Cruel Japanese Case Files. Fusosha Publishing. pp. 60–67. ISBN 4-594-02915-9.
