= Miyagi Tamayo =

Japanese social worker and politician

- 宮城 タマヨ

Member of the House of Councillors
- In office 3 May 1947 – 2 May 1959
- Preceded by: Constituency established
- Succeeded by: Multi-member district
- Constituency: National district

Personal details
- Born: 1 February 1892 Yoshiki, Yamaguchi, Japan
- Died: 19 November 1960 (aged 68)
- Party: Ryokufūkai
- Spouse: Miyagi Chōgorō (m. 1927; died 1942)
- Education: Nara Women's Higher Normal School

Miyagi Tamayo (宮城タマヨ, Miyagi Tamayo; 1 February 1892 – 19 November 1960), née Ueda (植田, Ueda), was a Japanese social worker and politician who was a member of the House of Councillors.

== Early life and education ==
Miyagi Tamayo was born on 1 February 1892 in Yamaguchi town in Yoshiki District, Yamaguchi, the second daughter of Ueda Kyūnojō (植田久之丞). She graduated from the Nara Girl's Higher Normal School Natural History Department in March 1914, and she later became an assistant teacher at her alma mater.

From 1920 until 1923 she studied child protection issues at the Ohara Institute for Social Research. In 1922, the same year the shōnenhō was enacted, she traveled to the United States on behalf of the Ministry of Education, Science, Sports and Culture and the Ministry of Justice to study child protection projects. After returning to Japan, he became Japan's first female probation officer at the Tokyo juvenile court. She was married to Miyagi Chōgorō, a prosecutor in the Supreme Court of Judicature of Japan, from 1927 until his death in 1942.

== Political career ==
Miyagi Tamayo was elected to the House of Councillors national district in the 1947 Japanese House of Councillors election, and was a member of Ryokufūkai. She was re-elected in the 1953 Japanese House of Councillors election, and she devoted her efforts to the enactment of the Prostitution Prevention Law. She was a member of the committees for Central Youth Affairs, Prostitution Countermeasures, and Rehabilitation and Protection, and she was also the Chairman of the House of Councillors Library. She was the director of the Judicial Protection Association and of the Japan Women's Social Education Association. She was a member of the Kyoritsu Women's University board of trustees.

In 1957, she heard Westminster Quarters while in England, and she came up with the idea of giving "mother bells" as presents; by 1959, she had installed them in sixty-four locations across Japan, including juvenile institutions and women's guidance homes.

Miyagi Tamayo died on 19 November 1960.

== Bibliography ==
- Miyagi, Tamayo (1944). 台所の心 (in Japanese). 主婦之友社.
- Miyagi, Tamayo (1952). 私の歩み : 続 台所の心 (in Japanese). 主婦の友社.
- Miyagi, Tamayo (1957). 問題の子らと四十年 (in Japanese). 大日本雄弁会講談社.
