= Sachiko Eto =

Japanese serial killer and cult leader

- Born: August 21, 1947; Sukagawa, Fukushima, Occupied Japan
- Died: September 27, 2012 (aged 65); Miyagi Prison, Sendai, Japan
- Other name: "The Drumstick Killer"
- Status: Executed by hanging
- Conviction: Murder (6 counts)
- Penalty: Death

Details
- Victims: 6
- Span of crimes: 1994–1995
- Country: Japan
- State: Fukushima
- Date apprehended: July 5, 1995

Sachiko Eto (江藤 幸子, Etō Sachiko; August 21, 1947 – September 27, 2012), known as The Drumstick Killer, was a Japanese cult leader and serial killer, responsible for six murders in Sukagawa City between 1994 and 1995.

A self-professed guru who claimed to have psychic abilities, she killed several of her cult members during bizarre rituals involving taiko sticks. For her crimes, she was sentenced to death and subsequently executed in 2012.

== Murders and arrest ==
From December 1994 to June 1995, Eto's followers, consisting of her daughter Yuko (23), Hiroshi Nemoto (21) and Mitsuo Sekine (45), assisted in killing the "ugly devils". In particular, Nemoto helped her in killing the six victims, as well as the injury of one female cult member.

On July 5, the Fukushima Prefectural Police decided to search Eto's house after the hospitalization of one cult member. They found six rotting corpses, and arrested Sachiko and her three followers. Later, the surviving victim was also arrested upon discovery that she had participated in the assault.

The victims included Hiroshi's wife, male follower J., J.'s wife and daughter, male follower K. and female follower N.

== Trial ==
- In March 1997, the Sendai High Court handed a 3-year sentence to the surviving cult member, including a 5-year suspended sentence (it's unknown if the decision was appealed).
- On November 16, 2001, the Fukushima District Court requested a death sentence for Sachiko Eto, life imprisonment for Hiroshi Nemoto and Yuko Eto, and 20 years' imprisonment for Mitsuo Sekine.
- On May 10, 2002, all the sentences were affirmed, but Sekine's sentence was reduced to 18 years. Shingo Takahashi and Assistant Professor of Psychiatry Daidai Toho, the representative directors of the Japan De-Carte Association, analyzed the trial in the same fashion as those of the Aum Shinrikyo.
- On November 11, 2003, the Sendai High Court dismisses appeals for diminished sentences by the conspirators.
- On November 12, 2005, Sachiko Eto's appeal was also rejected by the Sendai High Court.
- On September 16, 2008, her appeal was officially dismissed by the Supreme Court of Japan, thus confirming Eto's death sentence. She was the 10th female prisoner to be sentenced to death after the war.
- On September 27, 2012, Sachiko Eto was executed in Miyagi Prison, in Sendai. She was the first woman executed in 15 years, and the fourth-in-line starting from 1950.

== See also ==
- Lynching
- Stockholm syndrome
- Cult
- List of executions in Japan
- List of serial killers by country
