= Takeshige Hamada =

Japanese serial killer (1927–2017)

- Born: March 10, 1927; Noda, Kagoshima, Japan (present-day Izumi)
- Died: June 26, 2017 (aged 90); Fukuoka, Japan
- Cause of death: Asphyxiation
- Conviction: Murder (3 counts)
- Penalty: Death

Details
- Victims: 3
- Span of crimes: 1978–1979
- Country: Japan
- State: Fukuoka
- Date apprehended: September 27, 1979

Takeshige Hamada (浜田武重, Hamada Takeshige; March 10, 1927 – June 26, 2017) was a Japanese serial killer who, together with his wife and two accomplices, murdered three people over life insurance policies in Fukuoka from 1978 to 1979. He was sentenced to death for his crimes, but died before he could be executed. At the time of his death, at the age of 90, he was the oldest convict on death row.

== Early life ==
Takeshige Hamada was born on March 10, 1927, in the small town of Noda, Kagoshima (present-day Izumi). His father died of an unspecified illness when he was five years old, leaving behind a debt of 60 yen that his mother and uncle had to pay for. His mother, a farmer who occasionally ventured into the neighbors' home to work as a housekeeper, was the main source of the family's income, but she began suffering from periostitis when Hamada was in the second grade, rendering her immobile for about a year and a half. As a result, the young man had to leave school to take care of her and the household, performing tasks such as transporting water provided by the neighbor on a carrying pole about 10 times per day, collecting firewood from the nearby mountain and washing clothes in the nearby stream.

Due to the family's poor financial situation, Hamada did not wear pants, and had to attend physical education using pants provided by the school staff. He also never wore sneakers or boots, and on sunny days wore straw sandals. Hamada later claimed that one of his teachers would always give him a bento after classes, a kind act that made him work harder than others. While he only attended three of the six years of elementary school, Hamada excelled at math and the soroban, always scoring 100 points at the latter and competing solo in tournaments with it.

Immediately after graduating elementary school in March 1939, Hamada's uncle got him a job at a kamaboko store in Ōmuta. There, he would often drive a trike to go buy ice cream, and was often entrusted with work related to the soroban or books, but not long after the Pacific War began, he was drafted to serve in the army.

On October 20, 1943, he was sent to work at a Kyushu Hikoki factory based behind what is now Minami-Fukuoka Station, and on weekends, he was engaged in airplane assembly work while simultaneously continuing working at the kamaboko store. In July 1945, Hamada was informed that he was going to be transferred to the Fujisawa Navy Air Corps in Kanagawa Prefecture as a maintenance engineer on September 1, but this was prematurely cut short due to the end of the war.

After the end of the war, Hamada found employment at the Japanese National Railways at the recommendation of his older brother, where he worked along railroad crossings, but abruptly quit not long after.

=== Petty crimes ===
After leaving the Japanese National Railways, Hamada found work at the Toyobo factory in Yamaguchi Prefecture, where he worked alongside people from his hometown. One day, after being invited by a friend to have lunch, he abruptly quit; it was later discovered that he had been stealing supplies from the employees' dormitory.

Hamada was arrested for the crime in August 1946, and tried to explain himself to the arresting officer by claiming that the victim "did not deserve compensation because [he] was poor". When this was presented at his trial, the angered judge refused to give him a suspended sentence, and gave a 1-year sentence at the Kagoshima Prison. Thanks to the enactment of the new constitution, however, Hamada was prematurely pardoned and released, but was quickly returned to prison after he was caught trying to sell stolen goods on the black market at the behest of a friend. For this, he was ordered to serve another year and a half in the Kagoshima Prison. Hamada would be arrested twice for theft following his release, and while serving time at the Miyazaki Prison, his mother died from an illness. Taking into account his personal circumstances, Hamada was pardoned by the Parole Board.

After briefly working as a coal miner in Saga Prefecture, he returned to his previous job at the kamaboko store. At that time, he received three marriage proposals, including by the daughter of the store owner, all of whom liked him because of his kind personality. In the end, he married the store owner's daughter, as she had been 3-months pregnant with their child.

Despite the fact that he was expecting a child soon, Hamada continued stealing. He was eventually arrested after he was caught stealing wires from a nearby paddy field, which he planned to sell to buy clothing for the newborn. After his release, he moved the family to Fukuoka and started working as a taxi driver, but would be arrested twice more: once for auto theft and another for participating in a shoplifting gang. In total, he had spent 17 years in prison prior to beginning his murder spree.

== Murders ==
According to Hamada, the incentive for the murders arose after his wife lent 7 million yen to his 42-year-old associate from the shoplifting group. As a result, he turned towards life insurance policies to gather money quickly.

On March 25, 1978, Hamada and his 50-year-old wife went to the latter's house in Shime, where she was living with a 28-year-old female relative. The pair, they plied her with what's described as either alcohol or a sleeping pill depending on the source, then dragged the woman to the bathtub, where they held her head underwater until she drowned. The autopsy report erroneously determined the cause of death as heart failure, and the Hamadas became the beneficiaries of her life insurance policies, all of which amounted to 1.5 million yen.

Approximately three months later, on July 1, Hamada's wife was tasked with watching over her 16-year-old son-in-law, a high school student, who was left with them as her brother was suffering from an illness. At her suggestion, Hamada made the teenager inhale paint thinner, and while he was unconscious, he took him to an agricultural waterway in Umi, about 4 kilometers away from the house, where he held him underwater until he drowned. The pair later claimed that the boy had died from an accidental fall owing to paint thinner poisoning, and were awarded 10 million yen from an insurance policy they had taken out on the victim.

In 1979, Hamada was approached by his former shoplifting associate and his 44-year-old friend (hitherto referred to as "A" and "B", respectively), both of whom were rabid gamblers and struggling with debts. "A" informed Hamada that he planned to insure one of his workers and subsequently kill the worker, and asked him to aid in the murder, to which he agreed.

On April 17, the trio chose a 37-year-old with no known relatives, whom they insured in a contract for 60 million yen provided by the Mitsui Life Insurance Company, paying 30,000 yen as an insurance premium. As the man was known as a heavy drinker, the criminals devised a plot to stage a hit-and-run while he was out wandering the streets.

On the night of May 8, all of them gathered at "A"s house and let the worker drink plenty of alcohol. When he became drunk and fell unconscious, Hamada put into a small dumping truck owned by "B" and drove to the road behind Kyushu University in Higashi-ku. Then, around 3 AM on the next morning, after confirming that there was no traffic, he got the worker out of the car and laid him on the street, where he ran him over with the dump truck.

Before they could get the insurance policy, the insurance company, feeling that the fee was too high, returned the premium to "A" and temporarily canceled the contract. Hamada and his associates were unable to obtain money for this murder, aside from a small amount of yen obtained from "B", who had sold the dump truck immediately after the incident.

== Investigation ==
Initially, the Fukuoka Prefectural Police truly believed that the man's death was accidental, but after examining the circumstances closely, including the fact that the victim's friends had taken out a large insurance policy; had been at his house and that one of them, "B", had told an acquaintance about a murder, all three were arrested on September 27, 1979. All three defendants were initially charged with various degrees of fraud, embezzlement and counterfeiting.

On October 4, after more than a week of interrogation, all three confessed to killing the man and that they had planned to divide the insurance money. They were charged with murder, and authorities began to pay special attention to Hamada after learning that his wife's relative and son-in-law had died in similarly suspicious circumstances.

On November 21, Hamada's wife was arrested on suspicion of forgery, but during the interrogation, she admitted to killing her relative and her son-in-law in conjunction with her husband. Before she could be charged, however, she had to be hospitalized for treatment of cirrhosis and esophageal varices, but when police came looking for her, they were informed that she had escaped in the early hours of October 25. The wife travelled to Sasebo and remained hidden in the local area, but on the night of November 20, she was tracked down to a friend's house in Sue, where she was promptly arrested by investigators on the next morning.

== Trial ==
In March 1980, amidst trial proceedings, Hamada's wife died from her illnesses, aged 51. As a result, prosecution dismissed all charges against her.

On March 29, 1982, the three defendants were found guilty by Justice Shigeomi Akiyoshi, who addressed Hamada as a "greedy, systematically calm killer of relatives who claims no responsibility for the crimes and shows no regrets". Not long, as per the prosecutors' request, Hamada was sentenced to death, while "A" and "B" were both sentenced to 15 years' imprisonment as accomplices (the latter's sentence would later be reduced by two years).

On June 19, 1984, Hamada and "B" attempted to appeal their sentences before Justice Shigeru Yamamoto, who promptly dismissed them and upheld the initial verdicts. On March 8, 1988, Hamada appealed again, this time before Justice Masami Ito, with his attorneys claiming that the 1978 deaths were incidental and that his confessions were unreliable. In response, Ito dismissed the claim, saying that the convict's confessions were reinforced by those of his late wife and additional evidence reinforcing his guilt. By doing this, he effectively finalized the death sentence. During the process, 20 anti-death penalty activists who were attending the proceedings shouted out "Don't enforce the death penalty", resulting in the dismissal of one of them.

== Imprisonment and death ==
In the following years on death row, Hamada would unsuccessfully petition for a retrial twice, but was rejected both times.

Around midnight on June 26, 2017, a prison guard patrolling the death row noticed that the sleeping Hamada had begun vomiting. When medical personnel was brought in, they found that he was not breathing, and quickly transported him to a nearby hospital in Fukuoka. There he was kept on artificial ventilation and was given CPR by the hospital staff, but died two hours after his arrival, aged 90. His cause of death was listed as asphyxiation. At the time of his death, he was the oldest convict housed on Japan's death row.

== See also ==
- List of serial killers by country

== Bibliography ==
- Takeshige Hamada (May 25, 1987). 死刑囚からあなたへ 国には殺されたくない [From death row to you: I don't want the country to kill me] (in Japanese). Japanese Association for Abolishion of the Death Penalty. ISBN 978-4755400087.
- 死刑囚90人 とどきますか、獄中からの声 [Do you want to reach 90 prisoners on death row? Voices from prison] (in Japanese). Odoji Sachiko Foundation. May 23, 2012. ISBN 978-4755402241.
