= Kau Kobayashi =

Executed Japanese serial killer

- Born: October 20, 1908; Tamagoi, Saitama Prefecture, Empire of Japan (present-day Kumagaya, Japan)
- Died: June 11, 1970 (aged 61); Tokyo Detention House, Tokyo, Japan
- Cause of death: Execution by hanging
- Conviction: Murder (3 counts)
- Penalty: Death

Details
- Victims: 3 (one as accomplice)
- Span of crimes: 1952–1960
- Country: Japan
- States: Saitama, Tochigi
- Date apprehended: February 21, 1960

Kau Kobayashi (小林カウ, Kobayashi Kau; October 20, 1908 – June 11, 1970) was a Japanese serial killer who, together with accomplice Mitsuyoshi Onuki (大貫光吉) was responsible for murders of hotel owners Kamasuke and Ume Ikukata, called the Hotel Nihonkaku Incident (ホテル日本閣殺人事件, Hoteru Nihonkaku Satsujin Jiken.) After her arrest, she confessed to fatally poisoning her husband in 1952, and was later sentenced to death and executed for her crimes.

== Early life ==
Kobayashi was born on October 20, 1908, in Tamagoi, Saitama Prefecture (present-day Kumagaya), the second daughter of seven children born into an impoverished farmer couple's home. After finishing elementary school, she helped with housework until the age of 16, when she went to work as a housekeeper in Hongō, Tokyo. When she returned in 1930, she married 27-year-old Hidenosuke Hayashi, a sickly man suffering from gastroenteritis and gonorrhea who ran a store in Kumagaya. The couple would eventually have two children: a baby boy who died in infancy, and later a girl. When the Second World War broke out, Hidenosuke was called to serve, but was wounded in combat and returned to Japan.

After his return, the couple built themselves a house, from where they would sell bicycle tires and contraband items such as rubber, rice and sugar. On the side, Kobayashi herself sold gokabou, which provided additional income for the family. At one point, a 25-year-old police officer, Mataichiro Nakamura, was sent in to investigate the alleged contraband of illegal goods in the Hayashi household, but he was moved by their hospitality, and started occasionally visiting the family. Over time, Kobayashi, who was left sexually unsatisfied by her husband, began an affair with Nakamura. Despite being receptive of her advances, Nakamura told her that wanted to spend more time with her, and if that were to happen, she'd have to leave her husband.

== Murders ==
On October 2, 1952, Hayashi died from a sudden and mysterious illness, which the coroner labeled as the result of a cerebral hemorrhage. While there were suspicions that his wife was responsible for his death, the police ceased the investigation. Shortly thereafter, Nakamura moved in to live with Kobayashi, but was then fired from his job due to his behavior. Wanting to keep her new lover, Kobayashi began working even harder to run her business, eventually moving into Nakamura's house. However, this proved to be short-lived, as he eventually kicked her out and married a younger woman. A distressed Kobayashi was later observed banging at his front door and screaming for him to take her back, and even allegedly tried to poison his new wife, but still continued to provide him with money.

Despite her troubled personal life, Kobayashi's business began to flourish when she began a joint venture with her sister's family, where she was hired as a saleswoman. She would travel around the various prefectures, looking for onsen-centered businesses to promote the company's services. As a result, in 1954, she found herself in Shiobara, where her most infamous crime would take place.

Soon after her arrival in Shiobara, Kobayashi began familiarizing herself with the locals, and in the spring of 1956, she bought a small store in front of the Hotel Myogaya. Soon after, she began buying other stores and land in the area, eventually planning to build an onsen and work as a hostess. However, a majority of the townsfolk were unwilling to sell their properties, especially to a newcomer.

In the fall of 1958, Kobayashi learned about the Hotel Nihonkaku, a small inn which was about to be closed due to poor management. The proprietor, 53-year-old Kamasuke Ikukata, desperately in need of funds to keep the inn open, he offered Kobayashi to pay a 500,000 yen loan to his wife, Ume (49). However, when the two women met, Kau attempted to heckle the price down to 300,000 yen, which was rejected by Mrs. Ikukata. Angered by her refusal, in mid-January 1960, Kobayashi enlisted the help of 36-year-old Mitsuyoshi Onuki, offering him 20,000 yen and sexual services if she killed Ume Ikukata.

Reluctantly agreeing, on the night of February 8, 1960, Onuki strangled Mrs. Ikukata with a linen string while she was sleeping. He later moved the body to the boiler room, where he dug up the floor and hid the body there, pouring concrete over it so it couldn't be located. After her disappearance, rumors starting floating around the area that she had been killed.

Later in November, Kobayashi approached Onuki again, asking him to kill Kamasuke as well, but with poison this time. In mid-December, Onuki poured hydrochloric acid into Ikukata's meal and sake, but the strong taste put him off from finishing his meal. After their initial failure, on New Year's Eve, while the trio were watching TV, Kobayashi went to prepare dinner. When she was done, she snuck up behind Ikukata and started strangling him, after which Onuki joined in to help her by fatally stabbing him in the neck. The pair hid the body, and when customers came around to ask what had happened to Mr. Ikukata, they replied by saying that "he had gone to Tokyo for some money."

== Arrest, confession and trial ==
The disappearance of the inn owners fueled the rumors of their untimely deaths even further, eventually resulting in newspapers covering the case. As a result, both Kobayashi and Onuki were arrested on February 20, 1961, on suspicion of murder. Shortly after her arrest, Kobayashi admitted her guilt in the case, additionally confessing to poisoning her husband with potassium cyanide in 1952, claiming that she had been aided by her lover Nakamura.

Following these confessions, the three were put on trial, and on July 14, 1966, Kobayashi and Onuki were sentenced to death by the Supreme Court after being found guilty of the murders. Nakamura, who asserted his innocence from the beginning of the case, was acquitted due to lack of evidence.

== Execution ==
On June 11, 1970, the 61-year-old Kau Kobayashi and her accomplice were hanged at the Tokyo Detention House. She was the first woman to be executed in Japan after World War II.

== See also ==
- List of serial killers by country
- List of executions in Japan

== In films and culture ==
- The Japanese film Deviations and Passions, released in 1969, covered the Hotel Nihonkaku case, among other prominent cases in the country
- The 1984 film Station to Heaven, directed by Masanobu Deme, is heavily inspired by the case

== Bibliography ==
- Kazumasa Yoshida (January 9, 1994). Document book of Japan's incidents (in Japanese). Thirty-One Shobo. ISBN 4380942627.
- Kimiko Otsuka (1996). The last moment of the death penalty (in Japanese). Kadokawa Shoten. ISBN 4041878020.
- Criminal Psychology Institute (2001). 20th-century Quotes from Great Criminals (in Japanese). Joho Center Publishing. ISBN 4795834725.
