= Amagasaki Serial Murder Incident =

2011 Killings in Japan

Piranha Family
- ピラニア・ファミリー
- Founded: 2005
- Years active: 2005-2011
- Territory: Hyogo, Kochi, Kagawa, Okayama, Shiga, Kyoto, Okinawa, Japan
- Ethnicity: Japanese people and Koreans
- Membership: Lee Masanori; Kentaro Sumida; Yutaro Sumida; Rui Sumida; Mieko Sumida; Jeong Raitaro; Koji Nakashima
- Leader: Miyoko Sumida
- Activities: Torture and murder, 8 convictions; 11+ suspected.

Miyoko Sumida, a 64 year old Japanese grandmother from Amagasaki, Hyōgo Prefecture, allegedly coerced family and friends to kidnap, torture and murder multiple people for financial gain. The crimes began with the disappearance of a woman in or around 1987. At least 8 victims were confirmed to have died, mainly as a result of assault, confinement and other forms of abuse. The crimes were committed mainly in Amagasaki, but also elsewhere in Hyogo, and in Kochi, Kagawa, Okayama, Okinawa, Shiga and Kyoto Prefectures.

Miyoko Sumida and 7 others were arrested on 7 November 2011. Sumida committed suicide on 13 December 2012 while awaiting trial.

== Gang Members ==
=== Serial Killers ===
Name	Birthday	Claimed victims	Notes	Criminal penalty
Miyoko Sumida	October 12, 1948	8-11+	Main culprit of the incident, together with seven accomplices, collectively tortured and killed at least eight people.	N/A
Lee Masanori	1978	8+	Known as "Violent device"; Korean nationality, Miyoko Sumida's cousin, He raped his accomplice, Rui Sumida, many times.	life sentence
Kentaro Sumida	1982	4+	Miyoko Sumida's eldest son.	21 years in prison
Yutaro Sumida	1987	3+	Miyoko Sumida's second son.	17 years in prison
Rui Sumida	1985	3+	Yutaro's wife, Rui was raped by Lee Masanori many times.	23 years in prison
Mieko Sumida	1953	3+	indicted for murder and other crimes against the eldest and second son of family A and the eldest daughter of family D, and received a sentence of 21 years in prison.	21 years in prison
Jeong Raitaro	1950	6+	Miyoko Sumida's common-law husband,Korean nationality.	21 years in prison
Koji Nakashima	1969	3+	Victim "M"'s husband.	15 years in prison

== Overview ==
For at least 25 years, Miyoko Sumida had been living together with many others in the southeastern area of Amagasaki City, Hyogo Prefecture, building a pseudo-family not related to her by blood. Although several suspicious deaths and disappearances had occurred one after another around 1987, starting with the disappearance of Yoshiko Hashimoto, the case would not come to light for many years.

However, in November 2011, a woman in her 40s who had been held captive escaped from confinement and ran to the police. Sumida was arrested on suspicion of assaulting Kazuko Oe's eldest daughter following her death. Furthermore, this case allowed for the investigation to further advance, and a series of other incidents came to light when an accessory from a separate case, who had been arrested in October 2012 (the theft of C's mother's pension), fully confessed to the crime. Shortly after, in December 2012, Sumida committed suicide at the detention center of the Hyogo Prefectural Police Department without saying much about the incident.

A joint investigation by the Hyogo, Kagawa, and Okinawa prefectural police, which had been investigating the cases based on the statements of X's accomplices, was disbanded in March 2014, which effectively ended the investigation. Eleven people, including X and her relatives, were indicted on charges of manslaughter and murder for six of the eight confirmed deaths. Trials were held for only ten of the relatives as X had committed suicide in jail. The whereabouts of three people who were close to X are still unknown. One was allegedly killed by X but the body was never found, and the other two are missing but their information was made available to the public.

Among the numerous mass murder cases in Japan, one notable feature of this particular incident is the high number of individuals arrested and referred to prosecutors, totaling 17. It was later revealed that during the "family hijacking", Sumida would take advantage of minor weaknesses and intimidation tactics to control entire families. It was also revealed that many of the victims were subjected to forced violence against their relatives, were restricted from eating, drinking, and sleeping, and were even deprived of their property and forced to break apart their families. Many of the arrested and documented persons who were taken in by X as members of her pseudo-family were also forced to be involved in the crimes. In addition, many of these members ended up becoming relatives either through forced marriages or adoption.

== Persons Involved in Incident ==
（List of those who were arrested, prosecuted, deceased, or claimed as a missing person.）

=== Miyoko Sumida (Arrest & Death) ===
Born in 1948.
On December 12, 2012, she committed suicide in a detention center at the Hyogo Prefectural Police Headquarters. She held absolute power within her pseudo-family, forcing her cohabitants to swear their loyalty and sanctioning those who disobeyed her. She would also take them on trips and outings. Some would take this opportunity to escape but would be persistently sought out and brought back.
She was charged with one account of manslaughter, but the charges were dismissed due to the nature of the death. However, following her death, she was charged for the manslaughter and murders of her eldest son, second son, and eldest daughter among other charges.

=== Sumida一"Family" ===
A "family" formed through repeated adoptions with relatives in the course of X's multiple "family takeovers", none of whom are related by blood.

Mieko Sumida (A's oldest son's registered wife) 【Arrested】
Born in 1953.
They had known each other since childhood since H's mother had been renting a room from X's mother, where they had lived together for several decades. She was adopted by X's mother in 1988.
According to H's own testimony, X would often yell at H's parents and forcibly separated her form her family, at which point the two began to live together. H was then forced to work at snack bars and a "soap-land" as a prostitute by X, and most of her salary was taken away by X. It is also said that she had attempted to commit suicide due to the debt she had incurred in her life and the pressure of her pseudo-family.
In 2001, on X's orders, she married A's eldest son. It's said that she played a role similar to X's treasurer and was the first to confess the disposal location of the three bodies linked to the series of incidents. She kept a diary detailing communal life, in which no incidents of violence or abuse were recorded, but it was noted that the victims' names ceased to appear around the time of their deaths. [clarification needed]
In the case regarding the theft of the pensions of eldest son and mother of Family C, H was sentenced to two years in prison at the first trial. She was then indicted for murder and other crimes against the eldest and second son of family A and the eldest daughter of family D, and received a sentence of 21 years in prison.
Jeong Raitaro 【Arrested】
Born in 1950.
He had known X since he was in his twenties and had a long, common-law relationship with her, but it was reportedly a subservient relationship as he claims that she was abusive at times. He was indicted for murder and other crimes against the eldest son A, the second son A, and the eldest daughter D, two of which were found guilty of murder and one of which was found guilty of inflicting bodily injury, and sentenced to 21 years in prison.
Miyoko's Female Cohabitant 【Deceased】
Born 1941.
It is said that they got to know each other through her relationship with X's brother. They lived together as if in a domestic partnership and became joint debtors when they purchased a condominium together in 2000. She allegedly died around November 2008, and seven people have been charged with confinement.
Yutaro Sumida (Rui's Husband) 【Arrested】
Born in 1986.
Kentaro Sumida 【Arrested】
Born in 1982.
Lee Masanori (C's ex-wife's stepchild) 【Arrested】
Born in 1974.
Rui Sumida (Yutaro's wife) 【Arrested】
Born in 1985.
Koji Nakashima (Husband of D's eldest daughter) 【Arrested】
Born in 1969.

=== A's Relatives ===
A and her three children once lived in a rented room in her parents' home. By the mid-1980s, the family of four began to live together.

A【Missing】
Born between 1927- 1928.
A's Eldest Son (H's husband)【Deceased】
Born in 1953.
A's Second Son【Deceased】
Born in 1958.

=== B Family ===
Around March 1998, X became involved in a dispute over the funeral of B's aunt and demanded money from her relatives.

B【Deceased】
Born between 1925 - 1926.
B's Eldest Son【Deceased】
Born between 1974 - 1975.
B's Fourth Son【Missing】
Born between 1975 - 1976.

=== C & D Family ===
C's Mother【Deceased】
Born in 1924.
C【info from Document Submitted to Prosecution】
Born between 1942 - 1943.
C's Brother【Deceased - info from Document Submitted to Prosecution】
Born between 1948 - 1949.
C's Sister（Second Daughter）【Missing - info from Document Submitted to Prosecution】
Born between 1952 - 1953.
C's Grandchild【info from Document Submitted to Prosecution】
Born between 1980 - 1981.
A case was referred to the public prosecutor's office on suspicion of causing death by bodily injury to C's mother; however the case was dropped due to the expiration of the statute of limitations.
D（C's mother's eldest daughter）【Deceased - info from Document Submitted to Prosecution】
Born in 1949.
D's Eldest Daughter（Wife of L）【Deceased - info from Document Submitted to Prosecution】
Born in 1982.
D's Brother-in-Law【Deceased】
Born in 1944.

=== E & F Family ===
E, who had been working for a private railway company at the time, responded to a complaint which led X to intervene in the family affairs of E's family and E's mother-in-law (F).

== After X's Arrest ==
On November 7, 2011, Hyogo Prefectural Police found a drum can containing F's body in a rental house in Amagasaki City, and on November 26, 2011, X and others were arrested on suspicion of abandoning F's body. After hearing about this report, D's husband rushed to the Kobe District Public Prosecutors Office's Amagasaki branch and explained the incident to the police.

In August 2012, investigators from the Hyogo Prefectural Police found C hiding out in Amagasaki City under a false name. Based on C's testimony, H and N were re-arrested on charges of theft for withdrawing C and C's mother's pension without permission. During the interrogation of this re-arrest, H confessed to the murder and dumping of the body in September, and N also acknowledged H's confession.

In October, the bodies of D's eldest daughter, D's brother-in-law, and G were discovered underneath the floorboards of C's mother's house in Amagasaki City. On December 3, the body of C's mother was discovered in a farm equipment shed in Takamatsu City, and on December 5. X and seven others were re-arrested on suspicion for the confinement and murder of A's second son. On December 30, the body of A's second son was found in the sea in Okayama Prefecture.

December 12: X commits suicide inside Hyogo Prefectural Police Headquarters.

February 4, 2013: K, I, and seven others arrested on suspicion of confining and murdering D's eldest daughter.

March 6: K, I, and seven others re-arrested on suspicion of the confinement and manslaughter of G.

May 21: K, I, and six others re-arrested for the murder of A's eldest son. June 26: H, K, and six others re-arrested on suspicion of committing insurance fraud on A's eldest son. September 25: K and seven others arrested on suspicion of manslaughter of D.

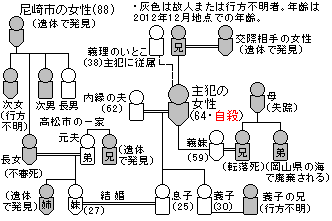

== Aftermath ==
On the 12th of December 2012, Miyoko Sumida committed suicide in a holding cell, whilst on suicide watch.

Since October 12, when a series of incidents were uncovered, Sumida had made several statements to her lawyers and police officers in charge of her detention alluding to suicidal ideation, saying things such as, "There is no point in living," "I want to die. How can I die?" The death of the main suspect following arrest made it difficult for investigators to uncover the truth of the case..

On December 19, X's body was cremated in Kobe City but no relatives came to claim the remains.

== See also ==
- Futoshi Matsunaga - main culprit of a similar case, Kitakyushu Serial Murder Incident (北九州連続殺人事件)
- List of serial killers by country

=== Similar Serial Murder Incident ===
- Chisa and Shinya Nakao - Known as "Second Amagasaki Incident" or "The Second Miyoko Sumida"; Thrift shop owner couple who sentenced to prison for torturing and killing at least three employees.
