= Tokyo attacks =

Tokyo attacks may refer to the following:

- Kantō Massacre (1923)
- Bombing of Tokyo (1942, 1944–1945)
  - Doolittle Raid (1942)
  - Bombing of Tokyo (10 March 1945)
- Assassination of Inejirō Asanuma (1960)
- Shimanaka incident (1961)
- 1974 Mitsubishi Heavy Industries bombing
- 1985 Narita International Airport bombing
- Tokyo subway sarin attack (1995)
- Myojo 56 building fire (2001)
- 2008 Akihabara massacre
- 2019 Tokyo car attack
- August 2021 Tokyo stabbings
- October 2021 Tokyo attack

== See also ==
- List of massacres in Japan
