= 2021 Tokyo stabbings =

2021 Tokyo stabbings can refer to:

- August 2021 Tokyo stabbings, a mass stabbing attack on 6 August 2021
- October 2021 Tokyo attack, a knife and arson attack on 31 October 2021
