= Murder of Airi Kinoshita =

2005 murder of a child in Hiroshima, Japan

Airi Kinoshita
- 木下 あいり
- Born: Airi Kinoshita; 10 April 1998; Kumamoto Prefecture, Japan
- Died: 22 November 2005 (aged 7); Hiroshima, Japan
- Cause of death: Murder by suffocation
- Occupation: Student
- Known for: Murder victim
- Parent(s): Kenichi Kinoshita (father); Miwako Kinoshita (mother)
- Website: stophanzai.web.fc2.com

José Manuel Torres Yake
- Born: February 1972 (age 54); Guadalupe, Peru
- Children: 2
- Status: Incarcerated at Hiroshima Detention Center, Hiroshima Prefecture, Japan
- Criminal charges: Murder; Illegal entry into Japan; Sexual assault abandonment of corpse
- Penalty: Life imprisonment

Airi Kinoshita (木下あいり, Kinoshita Airi; 10 April 1998 – 22 November 2005) was a Japanese girl who was sexually assaulted and murdered in Hiroshima on 22 November 2005. José Manuel Torres Yake, a 33-year-old Peruvian wanted for child sexual abuse in Peru, was arrested and charged with Airi's murder a week later. Torres was convicted and sentenced to life in prison in July 2006.

== Murder ==
On Tuesday 22 November 2005, Airi Kinoshita, a seven-year-old elementary school student from Hiroshima, disappeared on her way home from school. At 5 p.m. that day, a local resident discovered her corpse in a tape-bound cardboard box in a vacant lot in Hiroshima's Aki Ward. Injuries were found on her lower body that suggested she had been sexually assaulted. Her randoseru was later found alongside a road about 300 meters away, and had been carrying a so-called "crime prevention buzzer" but it was missing when her body was found. Around 300 people attended her funeral in Yatsushiro, Kumamoto Prefecture, her father Kenichi's hometown, with many mourners including Ground Self-Defense Force members who served with her father, a soldier. Kenichi Kinoshita stated: "I was deeply shocked when I was told by police that she was probably murdered," her father said in an address during the funeral, "I feel animosity toward the person who committed the crime. I hope the culprit is caught soon."

The Hiroshima Prefectural Police said they suspected that Kinoshita's killer had lured her away as she was walking home and then killed her soon afterwards. An autopsy confirmed that she had been murdered within 90 minutes of leaving school, around lunchtime between 1 p.m. and 2 p.m., and had died of suffocation caused by pressure to the neck. Police investigators learned that the box she was found in had been used as packaging for an oven sold at a home improvement store in Higashi Ward.

== Arrest and trial ==
By 29 November, the police sought the arrest of José Manuel Torres Yake, a 33-year-old Peruvian who lived in an apartment in Hiroshima near where Kinoshita's body was found. On 30 November, Japanese police arrested Torres at a relative's house in Suzuka, Mie Prefecture. Torres had illegally immigrated to Japan from Peru in April 2004 on a work visa using the false name Juan Carlos Pizarro Yagi and claiming to be 30-years-old, and relocated from Mie Prefecture to Hiroshima Prefecture in mid-2005. Japanese police discovered that Torres was wanted in Peru on multiple charges of child sexual abuse.

Kinoshita's murder had attracted attention from the Japanese mass media, and her real name was reported before it was revealed that she had been sexually assaulted. On 26 June 2006, her father Kenichi said: "Airi is not 'a Hiroshima first-grader'. She lived here. It is all right to use her name," after which the media resumed reporting her real name.

On 4 July 2006, the Hiroshima District Court sentenced Torres to life imprisonment for sexually assaulting and killing the girl, citing his haphazardness. He had dumped the girl's body close to his apartment. Prosecutors appealed against the leniency of the sentence, demanding the death penalty. On 9 December 2008, the Hiroshima High Court reversed and remanded the original verdict. However, the Supreme Court of Japan demanded that they continue his trial. The Hiroshima High Court upheld the life sentence, resulting in the end of his trial because they had not submitted an additional appeal by 12 August 2010.

== Reaction ==
Kinoshita's death caused a moral panic among parents in Japan, which had been thought to be a "safe society", and led to greater suspicion against otaku subculture in the country. The Japanese media had suspected that the criminal was an otaku while Kinoshita's murder was still being investigated, though Torres' arrest and conviction proved this to be false. The panic against otaku had existed in Japan since the arrest of Tsutomu Miyazaki in Tokyo in 1989, and was heightened by the arrest of Kaoru Kobayashi in Osaka a year earlier. Similar to Torres, both Miyazaki and Kobayashi had raped and murdered young girls around Kinoshita's age and were well-publicized as otaku, although there was little evidence of them being otaku.

Torres' charges of child sexual abuse in Peru meant the incident also had influence in Latin America. A journalist, Kent Paterson, indicated Torres into debates of femicides in Latin America.

== See also ==
- Tsutomu Miyazaki
- Kaoru Kobayashi
- List of kidnappings
