= Zoku =

Sino-Japanese term

Zoku (族) is a Sino-Japanese term meaning tribe, clan, or family. As a suffix it has been used extensively within Japan to define subcultural phenomena, though many zoku do not acquire the suffix (e.g. cosplay).

A zoku may be labeled with a Japanese stem (e.g. kaminari zoku) or a foreign language (gairaigo) stem (e.g. saike zoku, where saike comes from "psychedelic").

As with the usual practice elsewhere, subcultures in Japan have almost certainly been labeled by an outsider to the group, often an influential person in the media.

== Historic groups labeled as zoku ==
=== 1950s/60s ===
Subcultures that emerged in the early post-war decades include the "motorcycle-riding" Thunder Tribe (kaminarizoku), the amplified-music-loving Electric Tribe (erekizoku), and the Psychedelic Tribe (saikezoku)."

Although zoku was applied to others in society, like senior citizens, salarymen, and political activists (e.g. Uyoku dantai), it was mostly used to label youth subcultures.

Shintaro Ishihara's 1950s novel Season of the Sun gave rise to a reckless and carefree expression of youth which became stylised in subsequent films as taiyo zoku (太陽族, Sun Tribe). This subculture had some parallels with the rocker and greaser subcultures being promoted by Hollywood films such as Rebel without a Cause. Traditional Japanese considered the post-war taiyo zoku violent and promiscuous. Some Japanese youths admired American music, and Japanese Bill Haley clones were known as rokabiri zoku (the Rockabilly Tribe).

At the height of the hippy movement and the psychedelic age in the 1960s, the futen zoku (フーテン族) or vagabond tribe emerged in the Shinjuku area of Japan. Japanese media depicted them as dangerous because of their substance abuse and their public presence. More recreational drug users who patronized clubs and coffee shops were known as danmo zoku (ダンモ族).

=== 1970s/80s ===
A 1970s Japanese punk movement was known as karasu zoku (からす族, crow tribe) because they wore black clothing and accessories. Young women readers of the 1970s magazines "an an" and "Non-no" were known as the an-non zoku (アンノン族).

In the 1980s, fashion became mixed with music and dance in the form of the takenoko-zoku (bamboo-shoot tribe). This subculture was named after a boutique in Harajuku. Other parts of Tokyo such as Roppongi and Ginza have been centers of Japanese popular culture, and many zoku have been named after sites in these localities.

Another very significant group of the 1980s was the kurisutaru zoku (crystal tribe), which were branded a social group after the success of the novel Nantonaku, Kurisutaru (Somehow, Crystal). This label applied to youth who were swept up in the freedoms of the economic boom of the 1980s and became materialistic and conscious of their image, much like yuppies. They have been contrasted with the rougher groups that had existed since the 1950s.

The Hanako zoku (ハナコ族) of the late 1980s was associated with a popular magazine for young women called Hanako.

== Glossary ==
=== Street and racing tribes ===
- Bōsō zoku: motorcycle gang
- Dorifuto zoku: Drifting tribe
- Kaminari zoku: (雷族 "Thunder Tribe") early name for Bōsō zoku
- Rolling zoku: Off-road variety of Bōsō zoku
- Roulette zoku (also circuit zoku): Circular-highway racing tribe
- Vanning zoku: Van-driving tribe (van owning youths who install massive sound systems)
- Zeroyon zoku: 0-4 tribe (racers who use 400m straight-track roads)

=== Others ===
- Barazoku: Rose tribe (gay subculture in Japan)
- Danchi zoku (團地族): Unit tribe (white collar apartment dwellers)
- Dobunezumi zoku (溝鼠族): Sewer rat tribe (company employees in dull clothing)
- Figure moe zoku: Otaku who collect figurines
- Ereki zoku: Electric Guitar Tribe
- Hodo-Hodo zoku (ほどほど族): Employees who avoid promotion to minimize stress and maximize free time
- Hotaru zoku (蛍族): Firefly tribe (smokers on their smoking break)
- Madogiwa zoku (窓際族): Window-seat tribe (older, redundant employees who are retained by companies)
- Nure ochiba zoku: Wet leaf tribe (clingy retired salarymen) from "wet leaves" (ja:濡れ落ち葉, nure ochiba)
- Oyayubi zoku (親指族): thumb tribe (heavy users of cell phones for texting)
- Yuri zoku: Lily tribe (the lesbian equivalent of bara zoku)
- Zoku-giin (族議員): Policy tribes (many Japanese political factions are also suffixed with zoku)
