= Mamoru Takuma =

Japanese mass murderer responsible for the 2001 Ikeda school massacre

- Born: November 23, 1963; Itami, Hyōgo Prefecture, Japan
- Died: September 14, 2004 (aged 40); Osaka Detention House, Osaka Prefecture, Japan
- Occupation: Janitor
- Parent: Soichiro Takuma
- Status: Executed by hanging
- Convictions: Murder (8 counts); Rape
- Penalty: Death

Details
- Victims: 8–10 killed 15 injured
- Date: June 8, 2001 (massacre)
- Locations: Ikeda, Osaka Prefecture, Japan (massacre)

Mamoru Takuma (宅間 守^{[a]}, Takuma Mamoru; 23 November 1963 – 14 September 2004) was a Japanese mass murderer who killed eight children in the Ikeda school massacre in Ikeda, Osaka, on 8 June 2001.

Takuma had a long history of mentally disturbed and anti-social behavior, and an extensive criminal record including a conviction for rape. He stabbed eight students to death and seriously wounded fifteen others at Ikeda Elementary School in a knife attack that lasted several minutes.

Takuma was convicted in August 2003 and executed on 14 September 2004.

== Early life ==
Mamoru Takuma was born on 23 November 1963 in Itami, Hyōgo Prefecture, Japan. When she discovered she was pregnant with him, Takuma's mother reportedly told his father that she wanted an abortion. After his birth, she did not display any affection towards him and was reluctant to breastfeed. When Takuma was in elementary school, she told him, "I wish you had never been born." He was the victim of abuse and neglect by both of his parents – especially his father, whom he considered stabbing to death in his sleep.

Takuma displayed unusual and anti-social behavior as a child: at three years of age, he rode his tricycle towards the center of a highway, causing a traffic jam. He also threw stones at people and moving trains, placed stones on railroad tracks to disrupt rail traffic, and habitually killed cats and dogs by wrapping them in newspaper and lighting them on fire. From elementary school to junior high, Takuma was both a victim and a perpetrator of bullying, expressing envy and jealousy for the "highly educated and high-income elite" from an early age.

In February 1979, Takuma enrolled in high school in Amagasaki but dropped out in March 1981. He worked part-time at a gas station for several months until enlisting in the Japan Air Self Defense Force at the end of 1981, at the age of 18, in hopes of becoming a pilot. However, he was relegated to aircraft maintenance due to his poor eyesight, and he was eventually discharged in January 1983 for boarding, and sleeping with, a teenage runaway. His relationship with his parents worsened following the discharge, and there were incidents in which his father beat him with stones. Takuma in turn threatened to enlist in the yakuza to "mess up" his parents' lives.

In 1984, Takuma and his mother left the family home and purchased an apartment, leaving his eldest brother and father by themselves. They lived together for a year and a half, until his father came back for his wife. In February 1999, Takuma's brother, facing bankruptcy, died by suicide by slashing his neck with a knife. His father was hospitalized due to drunkenness after the incident, but according to Takuma, he "wanted [his father] to commit suicide like Tsutomu Miyazaki's father." Takuma's mother also had a lifelong struggle with mental illness, and died in late 2016. His father died in April 2020, aged 88. There are no remaining relatives, and the former Takuma residence in Itami was demolished in September 2020; the site is currently vacant.

== Criminal history ==
On 21 November 1984, Takuma raped a woman while collecting rent for a condominium management company. After the incident, believing the woman had filed a complaint with police, he consulted a psychiatrist with his mother on 12 December and complained about hearing hallucinations, "feeling that he's plunged into someone" and other complaints. The hospital initially diagnosed Takuma with anxiety but later stated he was schizophrenic in his medical certificate and in response to police inquiries.

Takuma, who was placed in a closed ward, was dissatisfied with his care. On 4 January 1985, he jumped from the roof of the hospital's fifth floor in a suicide attempt, but instead fractured his mandible and maxilla. He later wrote to his mother that he was hospitalized to avoid being pursued by police in a rape case and jumped to "harass his parents." After being discharged from the hospital, Takuma decided to commit even more crimes for "revenge on the world." Later, the doctor in charge of his psychological examination stated that it may have strengthened his resentment towards society.

In November 1986, Takuma was sentenced to three years in prison for the rape charge. While in prison, he jumped out of the hospital ward, explaining in a letter to his mother that he did it because she would not cooperate regarding his discharge. Takuma demanded that his parents pay for his living expenses after release. His father refused, citing Takuma's lack of remorse, and told him that he would hand over the money he traded in for his personal belongings to disown him.

After his release from prison in March 1989, Takuma moved to Ikeda and found work driving buses and trucks. His coworkers described him as a quiet and unremarkable man, but a bit of a loner who did not like dealing with customers. Takuma testified in a later psychological examination that he caused two fatal car accidents, one when he was driving a dump truck and the other when he was driving a semi-trailer truck. In the first incident, while transporting industrial waste in the mountains, Takuma drove in front of another truck and suddenly pressed the brake pedal on a downward turn, causing a collision; all the passengers of the other truck died the next day. He lied about the cause of the crash and was not indicted on any charges. In the second incident, while driving near the Metropolitan Expressway, Takuma caused a motorist to fatally collide with a side wall. He immediately left the scene.

In September 1993, Takuma was again arrested for rape. In 1998 he was fired after assaulting a bus passenger over the smell of her perfume. Takuma found a new job as a maintenance man at Itami Elementary School, six kilometers away from Ikeda. Later that year, he was arrested on suspicion of assaulting his ex-wife. On 3 March 1999, Takuma dissolved the tranquilizer temazepam into the tea served in the teachers' room, sending four people to the hospital for three days. Regarding this incident he said, "I was ignored by the teachers and did not go well with my family, and I wanted to relieve my anger due to human relationships." Takuma was arrested but not criminally punished as he was found "not responsible" due to mental illness.

In November 1999, Takuma was arrested on suspicion of burglary, but the charges were dropped. He managed to get a job as a taxi driver in September 2000 but was fired the following month after he assaulted a hotel bellhop in Osaka, breaking his nose. In November 2000 he got a job as a truck driver at a construction materials company in Ikeda but was fired a few months later due to problems including a road rage incident. He was also kicked out of several apartments for, among other things, throwing his garbage out from his balcony. On 23 May 2001, Takuma voluntarily admitted himself into a psychiatric hospital for depression but left the next day without treatment. He was also arrested for driving his car in reverse gear on the Hanshin Expressway but released after he was found mentally unfit.

== Massacre ==
On 8 June 2001, the day of his court hearing for the bellhop assault case, Takuma went on a murderous rampage at Ikeda Elementary School. He began to attack students and teachers with a kitchen knife until he was wrestled down by staff. In the quick attack, Takuma killed eight students (seven 8-year-old girls and one 7-year-old boy) and seriously wounded thirteen other children and two teachers. He was described as being in an extremely confused state when arrested, at first repeating, "I went to the elementary school," and then saying, "I went to the train station and stabbed 100 people with my knife. I did not go to the elementary school."

Takuma stated he "drank ten times the medicine" immediately after his arrest and a subsequent medical examination was performed on him. The medicine in question turned out to be three types: the antipsychotic Seroquel, the antidepressant Paxil and the benzodiazepine drug Lormetazepam. Even in the instance all of these medications are taken at ten times their standard prescribed dose, they are more likely to cause somnolence or sedation, not psychotic behavior.

Takuma also stated:

"I've become disgusted with everything. I've tried to kill myself several times, but couldn't. I wanted to be caught and be given a death sentence."

Takuma also expressed hatred for the affluent children who attended Ikeda Elementary School.

== Trial and execution ==
Takuma's lawyers argued that he was suffering from temporary insanity at the time of the attack, but the psychiatrist who had initially diagnosed him as schizophrenic told the court he later determined that Takuma actually had paranoid personality disorder.

On 28 August 2003, Takuma was found guilty of multiple counts of murder and sentenced to death. Takuma remained unrepentant, refusing to apologize to the families of the victims, and asked only for the sentence to be fulfilled as fast as possible. In court, he engaged in intentionally provocative behavior, including yawning, shaking his body, and staring at victims' family members. His statement was, "I should have used gasoline, so I could have killed more than I did." On the last day of the trial, Takuma still expressed no guilt or remorse and continued to insult the victims' families until the judge removed him. The sentence was carried out unusually quickly by Japanese standards (condemned prisoners in Japan usually spend many years on death row); Takuma was executed at the Osaka Detention House only one year later, on 14 September 2004.

== Influence ==
Takuma consistently hoped for the death penalty after the incident and was executed at an unusual speed in Japan. Since then, some people have committed crimes to be sentenced to death, including the 2008 Tsuchiura mass stabber Masahiro Kanagawa.

Kaoru Kobayashi, who sexually assaulted and murdered 7-year-old Kaede Ariyama in Nara in November 2004, considered Takuma to be a charismatic murderer and sought a speedy execution like him. He said:

"I want to be sentenced to death as quickly as possible, and leave a legacy among the public as the next Tsutomu Miyazaki or Mamoru Takuma."

=== Copycat incidents ===
- Kaoru Kobayashi (murderer)
- Yukio Yamaji
- Masahiro Kanagawa
- Toride Station 2010 knife attack
- October 2021 Tokyo attack

== See also ==
- List of executions in Japan
