= Furutani =

Furutani is a Japanese surname. Notable people with the surname include:

- Dale Furutani (born 1946), American writer
- Sokichi Furutani (1914–1985), Japanese serial killer
- Warren Furutani (born 1947), American politician
