= Akio Nakamori =

Japanese writer

- 中森 明夫
- Born: Ansaku Shibahara; 1 January 1960 (age 66); Mie Prefecture, Japan
- Education: Wako University
- Occupations: Columnist, editor
- Known for: Popularizing the term "otaku"; author of The Age of M
- Notable work: The Age of M (1989)

Akio Nakamori (中森 明夫, Nakamori Akio), real name Ansaku Shibahara (柴原安作, Shibahara Ansaku), is a Japanese columnist and editor born on January 1, 1960, in Mie Prefecture, Japan. He is credited as popularizing the term "otaku" in its modern colloquial usage (first used in Manga Burikko). After dropping out of Meiji University's Nakano Junior and Senior High Schools, he graduated from Wako University. Along with Yūichi Endō, he launched the Tokyo Otona Club in 1982.

He is most well known for his study of serial killer Tsutomu Miyazaki, The Age of M (Mの時代, M no Jidai), published in 1989. Nakamori is also credited as coining and popularizing the term "chidol," short for child idol, back in the 1990s to refer to young gravure idols.
