= Yasutoshi Kamata =

Executed Japanese serial killer

- 鎌田安利
- Police mugshot of Kamata
- Born: July 10, 1940; Ōzu, Ehime, Empire of Japan
- Died: March 25, 2016 (aged 75); Osaka Detention House, Japan
- Other names: "The Osaka Ripper" "The Monster with 22 Faces"
- Status: Executed by hanging
- Convictions: Murder (2 counts); Theft
- Penalty: Death

Details
- Victims: 5
- Span of crimes: 1985–1994
- Country: Japan
- State: Osaka
- Date apprehended: February 23, 1995

Yasutoshi Kamata (鎌田安利, Kamata Yasutoshi; July 10, 1940 – March 25, 2016), known as The Osaka Ripper, was a Japanese serial killer responsible for the murder and dismemberment of four women and one girl in Osaka between 1985 and 1994. The case was designated by the National Police Agency as "Metropolitan Designated Case No. 122".

At the time of the incident, the Osaka Prefectural Police considered it one its most important cases, investigated alongside the Glico Morinaga case.

== Background ==
Yasutoshi Kamata was born on July 10, 1940, in the city of Ōzu. The son of an inn proprietor, he married a local woman and worked as a disposable chopsticks salesman at a local inn, but learning that his wife had been cheating on him, he took their two children and moved to Nishinari-ku in 1960. He made a living by selling stolen merchandise to women working in the restaurant business at high prices. Kamata was regarded as an amiable, soft-spoken and kind individual, who was well-liked by his business partners. However, it was also known that he was prone to sudden outbursts of anger.

Kamata's modus operandi was to lure women to his various condominiums and apartments around Osaka, where he then proceed to strangle them. While he had around 20 known addresses, he committed the first three murders in Nishinari-ku, and the last two were committed at another residence in Naniwa-ku.

In addition to the murder charges he would later be found guilty of, he was also charged and subsequently convicted of theft in the third and fourth murders.

=== First and second murders ===
The first victim was a 46-year-old housewife from Higashisumiyoshi-ku, who was married and had three children, but on May 14, 1985, she had decided to go to a local bar in Nishinaru-ku under a pseudonym. Kamata visited the bar as well, and came across the woman, whom he invited to have a meal and some drinks with two other people, but by the end of the night, he brought his drunken acquaintance back to his condominium. There, he strangled the woman when she started resisting his sexual advances. Her body was only found after Kamata's arrest, having been dumped in a wooded area near the National Route 175 in Kobe's Nishi-ku ward.

The second victim was a 19-year-old college student, who went missing after she left her dormitory at around 17:00 on April 16, 1985, while en route to her job as a dry cleaner for a treatment facility in Tondabayashi. Kamata had met her near the Tsūtenkaku tower, and around 14:00, the two were seen eating at a sushi restaurant in Naniwa-ku. After that, he took the girl to his condominium, but when she requested 10,000 yen as pocket money, Kamata became angry and proceeded to strangle her with both hands. After killing her, he spread out carpets and vinyl sheets on the floor, and then cut up the body into pieces using a saw and a kitchen knife. After he was finished, Kamata put the remains in a cardboard box, put them in a rental car and then ditched them along a country road.

Early next morning, the victim's remains were discovered near the Miyoshi family's farm in Kōryō, Nara Prefecture, who immediately notified the district police about the gruesome discovery. Three months after the finding, on September 6, Kamata sent a taunting letter to the police chief, signed "The Monster with 22 Faces" (alluding to the Glico Morinaga case), postmarked from Sakai. After sending the letter, he temporarily fled to Tokyo after learning that an investigator had come to his favorite snack bar, using the Tokaido Shinkansen (from the Shin-Ōsaka Station to Tokyo Station), where he resided until things could quiet down.

In the letter, Kamata provoked police by telling them to "catch [him], if they can", naming the sushi restaurant that he took the victim before killing her and what body parts he had cut off, providing information only the killer could have known. When the Nara Prefectural Police traced the girl's whereabouts on the day of her supposed disappearance, they learned that she had been seen visiting the exact same sushi restaurant with an unidentified middle-aged man. When the circumstances were deemed consistent with the letter writer's claims, police concluded that the killer had indeed written it.

=== Third murder ===
Around 17:30 on January 22, 1987, Kamata stopped a 9-year-old walking home from school, ostensibly to ask her for directions towards the Sumiyoshi Grand Shrine and pay her 200 yen, whom he then kidnapped. He brought her to his home, intending to sexually assault the girl, but the girl's screams scared him off from doing so, and he instead strangled her. After killing her, he discarded the body in the mountains, and then called the Sumie Elementary School four or five times, where the victim was attending, requesting them to prepare a ransom of 30 million yen in exchange for the girl.

On May 4, the girl's body was found in a cypress forest near Toyono. While this victim hadn't been dismembered, Kamata would later admit later claimed that he felt no need to, as the girl's body was small enough to fit in a cardboard box.

=== Fourth murder ===
Shortly after killing his third victim, Kamata was convicted for several thefts committed between October 1989 and August 1991, and remained in prison until March 1993. Soon after his release, he started killing again. In an attempt to change up his modus operandi, he started frequenting the forested road near Todoromi, which he often used to travel to and from Fukuchiyama, as well as the National Route 423.

Around July 24, 1993, Kamata paid money to a 45-year-old snack bar employee to accompany him back to his house. When they arrived at his condominium, he strangled her. He then dismembered the victim's body with a saw and abandoned the remains in the mountains outside Minoh.

On April 4, 1994, an investigator from the Minoh Police Department, while searching for the body of Kamata's fifth victim, was examining the cypress forest grounds. Eventually, he found the skeletonized remains of the fourth victim, whose identity was subsequently verified on July 24 via her dentalwork.

=== Fifth murder ===
Around the end of March 1994, Kamata paid a 38-year-old restaurant clerk to accompany him to his apartment, where he then strangled her. He then cut her corpse into pieces, which he then discarded along the forested road in the cypress forest. Aside from that, he also stole the woman's clothes, which he then sold for a high price. Her remains were found on April 3, and her identity established on November 4.

=== Arrest and trial ===
On February 23, 1995, Kamata was seen stealing clothes from a warehouse in Chūō-ku, and later arrested for the theft in April. Kamata was considered a viable suspect in the serial murders, as he was familiar with the land surrounding the sushi restaurant visited by the second victim, as well as his rental car being sighted on the day of her murder, so his fingerprints were taken by the Osaka Prefectural Police. When examined, they matched those of the mysterious letter writer claiming to have killed that particular victim. In addition, it was known that he was acquainted with the last two victims from work, and the knives used at his workplace were similar to the supposed sharp tool used to dismember the corpses. Because of these circumstances, on May 10, the Osaka and Nara Prefectural Police began cooperating to connect their respective cases back to Kamata.

After learning that a joint investigation had been initiated, Kamata admitted to killing and dismembering the second victim, and was subsequently charged with the killing two days later. Not long after, he admitted to three other known murders, as well as to killing the first victim, whose case was considered unrelated until then.

== Trial ==
=== Initial trial ===
During the investigation stage, Kamata admitted to all of the crimes, except for the ransom letter in the schoolgirl murder, but when put on trial, he proclaimed his innocence and alleged that a friend of his was the real killer, and he had simply helped dispose of the remains. The phone call recording would later be played in court, with the prosecutors claiming that it was very similar to the defendant's voice, but Kamata's attorneys demanded a re-evaluation of the evidence. In response, the court contacted Matsumi Suzuki, the company director of the Japan Acoustic Research Institute, who conducted a voiceprint test on the suspect. The test results concluded that Kamata's voice was almost identical to the phone caller's voice. Aside from that, regarding the theft case which had triggered the accused's arrest, he denied the charge, claiming that he couldn't remember what he had done on that day.

The trial began on March 13, 1996, at the Osaka District Court and was presided over by Judge Toshio Shima, with Kamata notably claiming that he didn't remember the indictment and claimed all the charges, especially for the third murder, were "bullshit".

On January 8, 1999, Kamata's appeal trial for the theft charges took hold. According to Japanese law, the Osaka District Prosecutors Office were added to the murder charges, as part of the death penalty trial. In connection to that, the prosecutor pointed out that the ruthless nature of the murders, Kamata's antisocial behavior and his request for the death penalty to be applied as a just punishment for his actions. In regards to the phone call testimony, it was acknowledged that while there was a high possibility that the caller was indeed Kamata, it was not entirely sure and thus not used as evidence.

During the closing arguments on February 4, 1999, Kamata continued to proclaim his innocence, pinning all of the killings on his supposed accomplices. He additionally claimed that he had only helped dispose of the bodies, and that the confession had been obtained by a police officer who had beaten him into signing it.

==== Death sentence ====
On March 24, 1999, Judge Nobuyuki Yokota found Yasutoshi Kamata guilty of the first two murders, sentencing him to death. In regard to the ransom charge, he was acquitted, as the court considered the evidence insufficient to convict him of the charge.

Immediately after the ruling, Kamata announced that he would appeal his conviction to the Osaka High Court, citing his acquittal of the ransom charge as proof that he was innocent.

=== Appeal trial ===
The appeal trial began at the Osaka High Court on October 3, 2000, and was presided by Judge Hiroshi Fukushima, with Kamata wanting to appeal his convictions. He again claimed that acquaintances had committed the killings, and completely denied being responsible for the ransom charge. He argued that he had been assaulted by the investigator, while pointing out that he had been acquitted of the ransom charge, which was acknowledged even by the prosecutor. Because of this, his defense counsel considered the ruling erroneous and the convictions quashed. The defense's arguments were closed with a statement proclaiming their client's innocence, ending the oral arguments on February 27, 2001.

The decision for the appeal trial was held on March 27, 2001. For the first murder and the ransom, Kamata was again acquitted of the latter, but resentenced to death for the former. For the second murder, he was again sentenced to death. On April 13, 2001, Kamata appealed his convictions to the Supreme Court.

On June 6, 2005, the appeal trial for the Supreme Court, presided over Judge Hiroshi Fukuda was held, with the defense counsel again presenting their narrative that their client had simply helped dispose of the bodies, and was not a murderer. On July 8, the Supreme Court found upheld the verdict of the previous court rulings, securing the death penalty for Kamata.

== Execution ==
Despite campaigning to various organizations opposed to the death penalty, Kamata remained on death row for 17 years prior to his execution date.

In 2016, Minister of Justice Mitsuhide Iwaki signed the death warrant for Yasutoshi Kamata, and on March 25, 2016, he was executed by hanging at the Osaka Detention House. On that same day, former nurse Junko Yoshida was also executed for two murders at the Fukuoka Detention House.

== See also ==
- List of serial killers by country
- List of executions in Japan
