= Osaka Detention House =

Prison in Japan

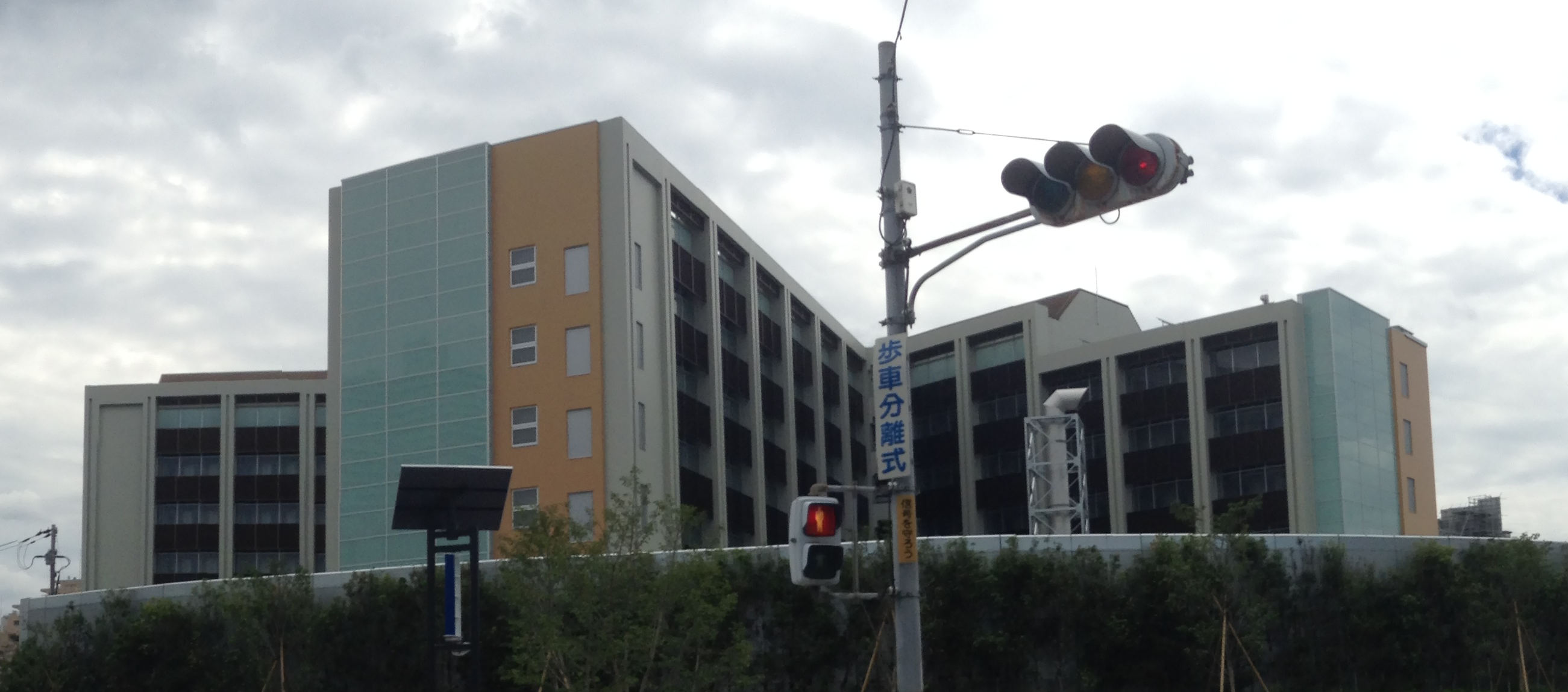

- Location within Osaka Prefecture Location within Japan
- Location: Miyakojima-ku, Osaka; 34°42′54.101″N 135°31′26.501″E
- Status: Operational
- Capacity: 2,500
- Managed by: Ministry of Justice

Osaka Detention House (大阪拘置所, Osaka Kōchisho) is a correctional facility in Miyakojima-ku, Osaka. A part of the penal system of Japan, it is operated by the Ministry of Justice. The Osaka Detention House is also home to one of Japan's seven execution chambers.

== Notable prisoners ==
=== Current prisoners ===
- Shinji Aoba – perpetrator in the Kyoto Animation arson attack (sentenced to death)
- Kazuhiro Ogawa – perpetrator in the 2008 Osaka adult movie theater fire.
- Tetsuya Yamagami – perpetrator in the assassination of Shinzo Abe

=== Former prisoners ===
- Kaoru Kobayashi (hanged 21 February 2013)
- Mamoru Takuma (hanged 14 September 2004)
- Yukio Yamaji (hanged 28 July 2009)
- Hiroshi Maeue (hanged 28 July 2009)
- Sokichi Furutani (hanged 31 May 1985)
- Yoshihiro Inoue (hanged 6 July 2018)
- Yasutoshi Kamata (hanged 25 March 2016)
- Tomomitsu Niimi (hanged 6 July 2018)
- Sunao Takami (hanged 21 August 2026)
