= Kaoru Kobayashi (murderer) =

Japanese murderer (1968–2013)

- 小林 薫
- Born: 30 November 1968; Osaka, Japan
- Died: 21 February 2013 (aged 44); Osaka Detention House, Osaka Prefecture, Japan
- Cause of death: Execution by hanging
- Occupation: Newspaper deliveryman
- Convictions: Kidnapping; Sexual assault Murder; Sexual assault resulting in death Theft; Intimidation; Abandonment of a corpse (2 counts)
- Penalty: Death

Details
- Victims: Kaede Ariyama (有山 楓, Ariyama Kaede), aged 7 (killed)
- Date apprehended: 30 December 2004

Kaoru Kobayashi (小林 薫, Kobayashi Kaoru; 30 November 1968 – 21 February 2013) was a Japanese murderer and child sex offender who committed the Nara elementary school murder case, in which he kidnapped, sexually assaulted and murdered 7-year-old Kaede Ariyama (有山 楓, Ariyama Kaede) in Nara, Nara Prefecture, on 17 November 2004. Kobayashi, an ex-convict and pedophile with a record as a prolific child molester, was sentenced to death for the murder of Ariyama and was executed by hanging at Osaka Detention House on 21 February 2013. Ariyama's murder caused a surge in the moral panic against otaku culture in Japan.

== Early life ==
Kaoru Kobayashi was born on 30 November 1968, in the Sumiyoshi-ku ward of Osaka. He worked as a paperboy since his childhood as his family was poor, and his mother died in 1978. In 1989, Kobayashi was convicted of sexually assaulting eight children, receiving a suspended sentence of two years imprisonment. In October 1991, Kobayashi attempted to kill a five-year-old girl and was sentenced to three years in prison, for which he was paroled on 9 November 1995, and officially released on July 23, 1996.

Kobayashi had worked at a newsstand for The Asahi Shimbun in Tomio, a neighborhood in the west-side of Nara, Nara Prefecture, between March and July 2000. At the time of the murder, he was employed as a newspaper deliveryman for the Mainichi Shimbun in the Ikoma District of Nara Prefecture, adjacent to Tomio.

== Kidnapping and murder ==
On 17 November 2004, Kobayashi kidnapped seven-year-old Kaede Ariyama at random while she travelled from Tomio North Elementary School to her home, near the west-side police station in Tomio. Using Ariyama's cellular phone, Kobayashi sent a photograph of the girl to her mother with the message: "I've got your daughter". Kobayashi then murdered Ariyama and dumped her body in the town of Heguri in the Ikoma District of Nara Prefecture, which was found that night. The autopsy revealed the cause of Ariyama's death to be drowning; the water collected in her lungs was not dirty, so it was assumed that she had been drowned in a sink or bathtub. Several of her teeth were missing and abrasions were found on her hands and feet, which were assumed to have been done by Kobayashi after her death. It also appeared that Kobayashi had undressed Ariyama before murdering her and then re-dressed her afterwards.

On 14 December 2004, Kobayashi sent an email from Ariyama's cellular phone to her mother's cellular phone, saying, "I'll take her baby sister next" with a photograph. He had shown off a photograph of Ariyama to a waitress and customers in a local bar, claiming to have gotten the photograph from a website.

== Arrest ==
On 30 December 2004, Kobayashi was arrested for kidnapping after he had sent a photograph from Ariyama's cellular phone to his own, which helped speed his arrest because the local cell phone towers logged the messages sent from the phone. Kobayashi lived in the town of Kawai in Kitakatsuragi District, located in the northwest area of Nara Prefecture along with Tomio and Ikoma, and was arrested after he had finished his morning paper route distributing the news that the suspect would be arrested soon. During a search of his room, the police discovered Ariyama's cellular phone and randoseru, a video and a magazine containing child pornography, and a considerable amount of girls' underwear which Kobayashi had stolen between June and December 2004.

A witness reported seeing Ariyama walking to Kobayashi's car, which suggested that they knew each other. However, Kobayashi said, "I would have kidnapped anybody."

On 19 January 2005, Kobayashi was prosecuted for kidnapping. Because he had previous sexual offenses involving girls, public attention turned to passing a law in Japan similar to Megan's Law in the United States.

== Reaction ==
=== Mainichi Shimbun ===
In the wake of the arrest, it was revealed that the manager of the newspaper delivery agency in Osaka's Higashisumiyoshi Ward had made a report to the police that a newspaper subscription fee of JP¥230,000 had been stolen (roughly equivalent to US$2,100). Afterwards, the manager discovered that the thief was Kobayashi, now working in Kawai. On 17 November 2004, the day of the kidnapping, a judge had issued an arrest warrant for Kobayashi for the embezzlement reported by the manager. However, the manager did not inform the police of this because he was promised that the suspect would repay him for the stolen money with monthly payments. Therefore, the police were not able to arrest Kobayashi and he was free to commit his attack. As a result of this, the Shimbun announced on 19 January 2005, that it would terminate its contracts with two delivery agents in Kawai and Higashisumiyoshi Ward in Osaka on 31 January.

=== Effect on otaku ===
Ariyama's murder fueled an increased hostility towards otaku culture in Japan, which had already been the subject of a moral panic since the killing spree of serial murderer Tsutomu Miyazaki in 1989. Miyazaki became known as the "Otaku Murderer" due to his strong interest in anime and horror films, sparking negative stereotypes of otaku leading people to become violent criminals, particularly against young girls. Kobayashi's crime was associated with otaku in Japanese society due to its similarity to Miyazaki's crimes.

Japanese journalist Akihiro Ōtani suspected that Kobayashi's crime was committed by a member of the figure moe zoku sub-culture, which Ōtani associated with lolicon even before Kobayashi's arrest. Although Kobayashi was not an otaku, and did not even own any figurines, the degree of social hostility against otaku seemed to increase for a while, as suggested by increased targeting of otaku by law enforcement as possible suspects for sex crimes, and by calls from persons in local governments for stricter laws controlling the depiction of eroticism in materials which cater to some otaku (e.g. erotic manga and erotic video games). Social Democratic Party politician Nobuto Hosaka criticized much of the uproar.

== Trial and verdict ==
Kobayashi's trial began on 18 April 2005. Kobayashi pleaded guilty and sought to receive the death penalty, stating he wanted to "leave a legacy among the public as the next Tsutomu Miyazaki or Mamoru Takuma"; both Miyazaki and Takuma were child murderers with histories of mental illness and sex crimes against children. For his part, Miyazaki stated, "I won't allow him to call himself 'the second Tsutomu Miyazaki' when he hasn't even undergone a psychiatric examination." Miyazaki was subsequently executed on 17 June 2008.

Kobayashi's psychiatrist diagnosed with antisocial personality disorder and pedophilia, but sane enough to be responsible for his actions, believing he might have even been gnawed by a sense of guilt. Ariyama's identity had been withheld by the Japanese media when the media learned of his sex crime, but the bereaved released her name and photograph in September 2006.

On 26 September 2006, Kobayashi was sentenced to death by hanging by the Nara district court. The defense made an appeal on the same day, but retracted it on 10 October 2006. Kobayashi's new lawyer claimed in June 2007 that the withdrawal was invalid, which the Nara district court declined on 21 April 2008. On May 22, 2008, the Osaka high court upheld the decision. On 7 July 2008, the Supreme Court of Japan upheld the decision.

Kobayashi was executed by hanging at Osaka Detention House on 21 February 2013.

== See also ==
- List of executions in Japan
- Murder of Airi Kinoshita
