= Sokichi Furutani =

Japanese serial killer

- Born: February 16, 1914; Tsushima, Nagasaki, Japan
- Died: May 31, 1985 (aged 71); Osaka Detention House, Japan
- Status: Executed by hanging
- Conviction: Murder (8 counts)
- Penalty: Death

Details
- Victims: 8–12
- Span of crimes: 1951; October – December 1965
- Country: Japan
- States: Fukuoka, Osaka, Kyoto, Shiga, Hyōgo
- Date apprehended: For the final time on December 12, 1965

Sokichi Furutani (古谷惣吉, Furutani Sokichi; February 16, 1914 – May 31, 1985) was a Japanese serial killer, who in the span between October 30 and December 12, 1965, murdered eight elderly men in a robbery-murder spree. He is also suspected of being responsible for murders of four other men, two of them occurring in 1951.

The crimes occurred in various parts of Western Japan, such as Osaka, Kyoto, Shiga, Hyōgo and Fukuoka, with the seven murders and two attempted robberies being designated as "Police Agency Wide Area Important Designated Case No. 105 Case". This was the first case in the National Police Agency's designated area.

== Overview ==
Furutani was born during the Taishō era, on February 16, 1914, in Tsushima, the eldest of five siblings. His parents were part-time farmers, who also operated as relatively wealthy fish traders, but when Sokichi was four, his mother died, while his father went to Korea in search of new land, breaking up the family. Furutani was sent to live with his uncle in Osaka until he was eight, also staying with other relatives at times. Since childhood, he was crude and unfriendly, stealing from friends at school, bullying junior high school students and fighting.

At the age of 10, his father returned and soon remarried. Sokichi returned to live with him, but his relationship with his stepmother was extremely brutal, from which he suffered beatings. Finally, Furutani, unable to stand his stepmother's abuse, began earning a living by stealing, and engaged in a life of theft and violence, spending his nights under the eaves of a temple. After graduating from elementary school, Furutani and his family relocated to Hiroshima Prefecture, but Sokichi was kicked out of his junior high school for beating up a teacher. His misfortune and misery in childhood led to the formation of a crude, self-centered and bizarre personality, which would later be responsible for numerous violent events.

During the early years of the Shōwa period, the 17-year-old Furutani was imprisoned for larceny in Hiroshima Prefecture in 1933. He remained at the Iwakuni reformatory in Yamaguchi Prefecture until April 1933, but was rearrested in August for another theft that occurred on May 4, for which he received four years imprisonment to be in served the Fukuoka Prison. Immediately after his release, he was sentenced to three years in prison for theft and fraud in September 1937, and given another six for theft in April 1941. On May 12, 1951, he tried to extort the Hyōgo Prefectural Police, whom arrested him, while he was using the alias of "Masao Shimizu".

By 1947, Furutani had amassed several convictions for theft, fraud and extortion, and had spent a total of 29 years in prison. Prosecutors accused the 50-year-old of "incredibly incomparable criminal offenses in the history of Shōwa", because of his indiscriminate and short-term crimes.

On May 23, 1951, while in Fukuoka's Hakata-ku ward, Sokichi and 19-year-old Noboru Sakamoto strangled a man and stole 6,800 in cash. In addition to robbing the yen, the duo also strangled to death a lonely, elderly man in Yahata (now Kitakyushu) on June 20, stealing 230 yen from him. Furutani and Sakamoto proceeded to flee, but Sakamoto was subsequently arrested, and later gave up Furutani's whereabouts. However, without knowing what role Furutani played in the murders, the Fukuoka District Court instead sentenced Sakamoto to death, and he was promptly executed in 1953 after claiming "I want him [Furutani] to be executed sooner." Because he had managed to pin the crimes on his younger companion, and with the lack of sufficient evidence to tie him to the crime scenes, he served time in the Kumamoto Prison before being paroled on November 9, 1963.

While on the run, the accomplice, who was 19 years old at the time, had served 10 years in juvenile prison. The series of murders took place shortly after his release (since then, the death penalty laws have changed). For this reason, many condemned individuals were convinced that it was too harsh of a sentence.

Furutani got a job with civil engineering after his parole from Kumamoto Prison, and after reading a newspaper article, in May 1964, he decided to move to the Kansai region.

On October 30, 1965, Furutani strangled a 57-year-old man who lived in Kaigandori, in Kobe, stealing 500 yen, as well as watches and the victim's pants. The next attack took place in Nishinomiya, with Furutani continuing his crime spree until December 12 of that year, always attacking in West Japan, with his targets being persons above 50 years of age and living alone. He committed eight additional murders, as well as two attempted murders and two attempted robberies. His victims included one man in Fukuoka, three in Hyōgo, one in Osaka, one in Shiga and two in Kyoto - all were killed by stabbing, strangulation or severe beating in either junkyards or construction sites. The killer snatched only small amounts of money.

The National Police Agency designated the case as "Police Agency Wide Area Important Designated Case No. 105 Case" on December 9, after establishing that the latest murder, that of a judo lecturer killed in Kasuya-gun, Fukuoka, on November 22, was the work of a serial offender. At the end of November, the so-called "Kumamoto Private Meeting" was put in charge of unmasking the offender. Based on a picture sent from a woman living in Kotohirayama, Kagawa Prefecture, the Ōmuta-based agency learned of a picture showing four people, among them the aforementioned woman and Sokichi Furutani. He was now sought for questioning.

On December 11, in Fushimi-ku, Kyoto, authorities found that a fingerprint was consistent with those of Sokichi Furutani, who was designated as Internationally Wanted the following day. On that very day, Furutani was in Nishinomiya, walking around the coastal bank when he came across two local salvagers (51 and 69-years-old, respectively), whom he beat to death with a hammer.

Coincidentally, a patrol of police officers were near the scene when they discovered the bodies of the two men in a hut. To their surprise, Sokichi was also hiding in the shadows of that very same hut, and tried to escape. Without a weapon, he still ignored the warnings from police, but Furutani, who was 51 at the time, was not physically capable of outrunning the multiple police officers who were on his tail.

Initially, he denied any and all charges against him, blaming a fictitious accomplice while proclaiming his own innocence, much like with his 1951 crimes. However, this time the prosecution had sufficient evidence, and Sokichi Furutani was sentenced to death. When asked for a reason for the killings, he gave a very simple answer: he begged for meals and accommodation, and killed those who refused. Not counting his initial murders, eight men were murdered, including some construction workers.

Police also determined that Furutani was responsible for an additional murder of an old man between 1964 and 1965, but lacked the appropriate evidence for it. In total, the prosecution accused him of committing 12 murders.

== Trial ==
On June 29, 1966, the first trial of Sokichi Furutani was held in the Kobe District Court before the presiding judge of Nagahisa. He acknowledged the seven murder and eight attempted murder charges after the prosecutor read the indictment, but on April 17, 1965, in Higashi-ku, he denied attempted robbery of a waste collection company and the purpose of his murders being robbery, claiming that it was "simply murder/attempted murder". He remained calm during the initial court proceedings, but when the prosecutor began describing one of the crime scenes in Kobe, he suddenly got up, shouted at, and subsequently beat up the prosecutor.

Since the trial was closed, Furutani tried to convince the court that he was innocent and that the incompetent police had beaten him into confessing, especially concerning the seventh case in Nishinomiya, for which he claimed the real culprit was a man named "Oka". He pled not guilty, and put all of the crimes on the mysterious "Oka". Furutani only admitted to the Nishinomiya murder, but denied robbery being the motive, claiming that he had not intended to steal the gold, but instead stopped to borrow some food and only killed the lodger when he refused to offer some.

On February 16, 1971, the Kobe District Court, headed by Chief Justice Nakagawa, as well as the Kobe District Prosecutor's Office and prosecutor Megumi Nakamura, sentenced Sokichi Furutani to death. The summary of the statement was as follows:

- From the number of physical evidence, there is no doubt that Furutani is the culprit. Credible working papers and a thumbprint match the defendant.
- Furutani argues that the real culprit is a man named "Oka", when, in fact, no such person ever existed, as he borrowed the name from a constable of the Fukuoka Prefectural Police, whom he had previously shown admiration and devotion to.
- It is sympathetic that he grew up in an unfortunate family, such as being bereaved by his mother and bullied by his stepmother in childhood, but that does not justify him in killing eight people.
- A rare, atrocious crime spree that robbed many of their precious lives, to which abolitionists will not object the request.

On April 1, 1974, the Kobe District Court handed down a death sentence to Sokichi Furutani. The ratio decidendi of the court was denounced as "in a brutal, ruthless act, with no other example in criminal history, you must compensate with your own life".

Furutani appealed the death sentence before the Osaka High Court in 1974. A second trial was held on December 13. The appeal was dismissed, after which he turned to the Supreme Court on November 28, 1978. The presiding judge, Takatsuji Masami, supported the death sentence and rejected the appeal, and in January 1979, the death sentence was formally established.

After the death penalty was established, he was held in Osaka Detention House until his execution, but on December 2, 1982, he attacked a fellow 39-year-old death row prisoner in his cell. This resulted in a one-week injury, with the supposed motive being jealousy. The other prisoner later said that "If Furutani was indicted in the case, he would not be executed until the sentencing was decided. He was not prosecuted, because I fear that it would raise the order of executions".

== Execution ==
On May 31, 1985, six years after being sentenced to death, Sokichi Furutani was executed in the Osaka Detention House following an order by Minister of Justice Hitoshi Shimazaki. At the time, he was oldest prisoner to be executed in Japan, a record later broken following the double execution of Yoshimitsu Akiyama and Yoshio Fujinami (77 and 75, respectively) on December 25, 2006.

Immediately after the execution, an official told Asahi Shimbun that Furutani "alternated" in his later years – one day, he would be calm like a Buddha, and on others, he would behave like a beast. He had no cellmates or friends, and the only person who sent him letters was a former investigator from the Hyōgo Prefectural Police.

== See also ==
- Recidivism
- List of serial killers by country

== Bibliography ==
- '50 years after the War' POST WAR 50 YEARS. Mainichi Shimbun. March 1995. ISBN 978-4620790053.
