= August 2021 Tokyo stabbings =

2021 mass stabbing incident in Tokyo, Japan

2021 Tokyo stabbings
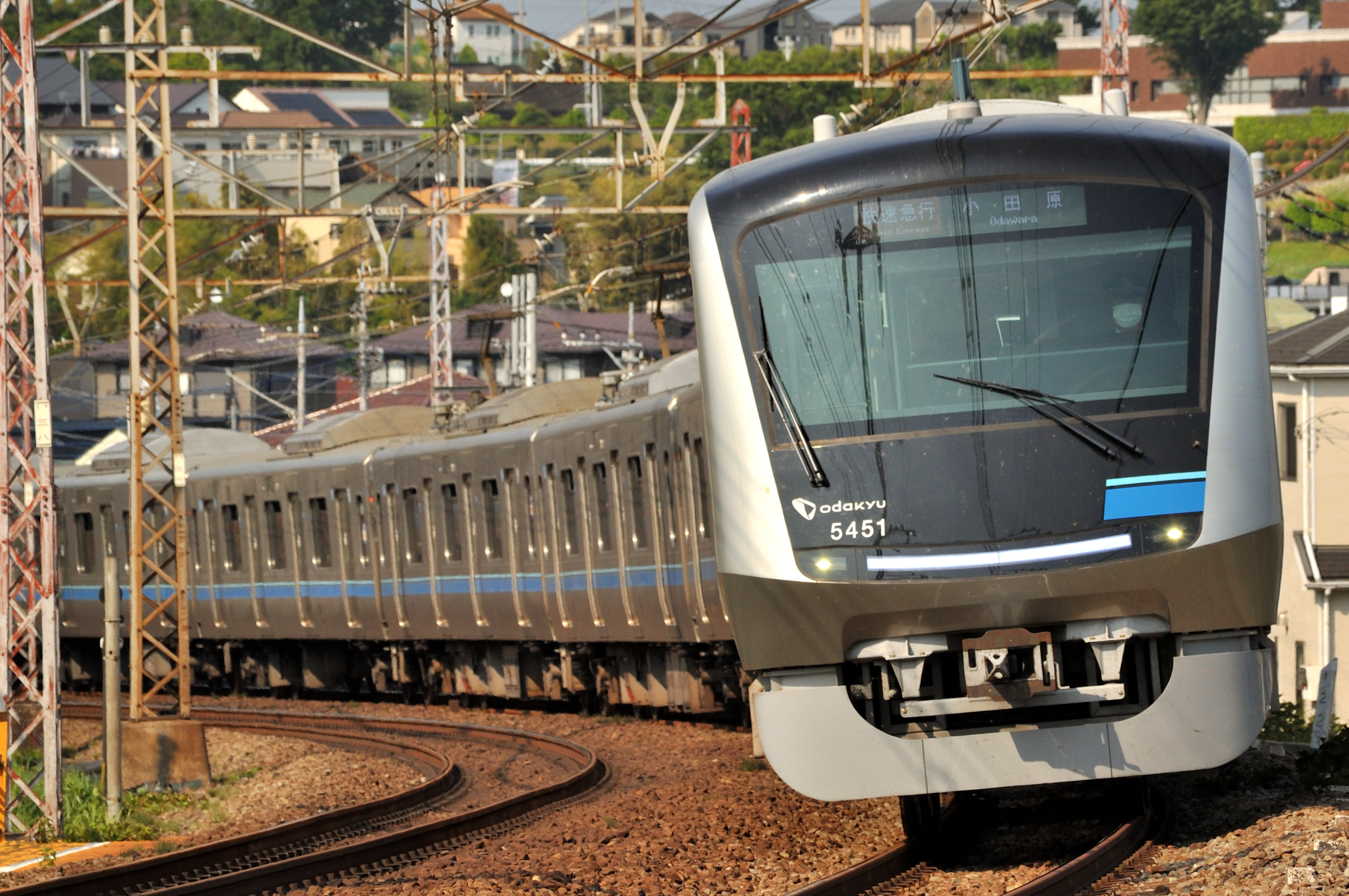
- An Odakyu train
- Location: Setagaya Ward, Tokyo, Japan
- Date: 6 August 2021; 8:30 p.m. (JST)
- Attack type: Mass stabbing, attempted arson
- Weapon: Knife
- Deaths: 0
- Injuries: 10
- Perpetrator: Yusuke Tsushima
- Motive: Alleged/claimed sexual and romantic rejection by women Jealousy
- Verdict: 19 years in prison
- Convictions: Attempted murder Robbery; Attempted robbery

A mass stabbing incident occurred 6 August 2021, on a commuter train in the Odakyu Electric Railway in Tokyo, Japan. Ten people were injured in the incident.

The attacker, a 36-year-old man named Yusuke Tsushima, was arrested hours later at a convenience store. Police charged him in January 2022 with attempted murder, robbery and attempted robbery. The possibility of femicide was suggested, based on Tsushima's testimony. On 14 July 2023, Tsushima was sentenced to 19 years in prison.

== Background ==
Although Japan ranks amongst the countries with the lowest crime rates, incidents of mass stabbings are not uncommon. In 2008, Tomohiro Katō, a 25-year-old man committed the Akihabara massacre, killing seven people. Eight years prior, Mamoru Takuma murdered eight children at an elementary school in the Ikeda school massacre. In 2016, 26-year-old Satoshi Uematsu committed one of the most serious incidents of mass murder in Japan since World War II, when he stabbed 19 severely disabled people to death at a care center. Further incidents happened again in 2008 when Masahiro Kanagawa killed a man and injured scores of others with a knife and most recently, the Kawasaki stabbings in 2019, when a man, Ryuichi Iwasaki, 51, who self-identified as a hikikomori, killed two schoolchildren and injured 18 others at a bus stop before killing himself.

Two months after the attack, 24-year-old Kyota Hattori, who was dressed as the Joker, committed attempted murder and arson in a Keiō Line train at Chōfu in October, resulting in 17 passengers being injured.

== Incident ==
At around 8:30 pm (JST: UTC+9) on 6 August 2021, Yusuke Tsushima, aged 36, began stabbing people indiscriminately on a commuter train in Setagaya Ward. A 20-year-old female university student was attacked relentlessly and sustained serious injuries to her chest and back. The victims were 5 female and 5 male passengers in their 20s to 50s, including the female university student. Three women and one man were stabbed; the victims were injured when they were hit by a blade wielded by the man, excluding the female university student. The other victims were injured when they fell down while running away.

The train was immediately halted and Tsushima spread cooking oil on the compartment's floor and tried to ignite a fire before escaping. Police rapidly responded to the incident, with a woman being transported to hospital with serious stab wounds to her chest and back.

Tsushima, who had been suspected of shoplifting earlier in the day, remained at large amidst a manhunt for hours. He finally entered a convenience store hours after the incident in Suginami Ward and informed the store employee that he was the suspect saying "I am the suspect in the incident reported by news media. I am tired of fleeing". The store employee quickly informed police and Tsushima was apprehended.

Although police opened an investigation, Tsushima was quoted as saying that he had been wanting to "kill a happy woman for the past six years" and added that the day of the incident "anyone would have been OK". He also stated that he thought "he could kill a large number of people given there's no space to escape inside a train".

Tokyo Police charged him later with the attempted murder of the seriously injured woman and other charges. Tsushima is a native of Kawasaki, Kanagawa.

On 8 August 2021, Tsushima was sent to the prosecutors, where he said that he was ultimately motivated to commit the crime when he faced online rejection from women and regretted that he had not killed anyone, quoted as saying that the fact that no one had died was "unfortunate" for him. He also said that his life was a misery and blamed society.

=== Plan to bomb Shibuya Crossing ===
On 10 August 2021, Tsushima reiterated his intent to target "happy-looking couples" in his attack and told police he considered bombing the famous Shibuya Crossing in Tokyo. Tsushima told investigators that he was willful in his intent to kill the seriously injured woman on the train because she looked like a "winner" in life. Police formally re-arrested him after the interrogation.

== Legal proceedings ==
On 28 January 2022, Tokyo prosecutors formally charged Tsushima with attempted murder, and a judge remanded him in custody, after finding him fully liable to respond to the charges. He was later also charged with robbery and attempted robbery.

On 27 June 2023, Tsushima admitted to the attack but his lawyers stated that he had no murderous intent.

On 14 July 2023, Tsushima was sentenced to 19 years in prison, with the presiding judge calling his motives "selfish" and the attack "extremely malicious," which the judge said, "left no room for leniency."

== See also ==
- 2014 Taipei Metro attack
- Shimonoseki Station massacre
- Tokaido Shinkansen stabbings
- October 2021 Tokyo attack
