= Yukio Yamaji =

Japanese serial killer

- Yukio Yamaji
- Born: August 21, 1983; Shimonoseki, Yamaguchi, Japan
- Died: July 28, 2009 (aged 25); Osaka Detention House, Osaka, Japan
- Status: Executed by hanging
- Motive: Domestic dispute (matricide); Pleasure (double murder)
- Convictions: Murder (2000); Murder (2 counts) (2005)
- Penalty: Committed to a juvenile detention center for "intermediate-level offenders" (2000); Death (2005)

Details
- Victims: 3
- Date: July 29, 2000; November 17, 2005
- Country: Japan
- States: Yamaguchi, Osaka
- Weapons: Metal baseball bat (matricide); 4.8-inch paring knife (double murder)
- Date apprehended: July 31, 2000; December 5, 2005

Yukio Yamaji (山地 悠紀夫, Yamaji Yukio; August 21, 1983 – July 28, 2009) was a Japanese serial killer convicted of the Yamaguchi matricide case and the Osaka sisters murder case.

In 2000, Yamaji killed his mother during an argument. As he was a juvenile offender, youth detention was imposed, leading to Yamaji's release after two years. The case was high profile amidst a spate of other violent crimes perpetrated by teenagers in Japan.

In 2005, Yamaji raped and murdered sisters Asuka and Chihiro Uehara in a home invasion, setting fire to their apartment to destroy evidence. Due to the brutality of the crime and Yamaji's prior criminal record, there were renewed debates about the effectiveness of juvenile law.

Yamaji was sentenced to death in 2006 and executed in 2009.

== Biography ==
Yamaji's father, described as a physically abusive alcoholic who frequently changed jobs, died of cirrhosis in January 1995, leaving him to be raised by his mother as a single parent in Yamaguchi. The family subsequently had severe financial difficulties. He graduated junior high school in the spring of 2000, having remained absent for nearly all of his final semester, with no plans for tertiary education.

Since late 1999, Yamaji was employed in newspaper delivery. He briefly quit in February 2000 before returning to work in April. A few hours before killing his mother, Yamaji told his boss that he was planning to run away from home, stating that he had argued with his mother after finding out about her substantial debts. His boss promised to increase Yamaji's delivery jobs to aid in this.

=== Matricide ===
On July 29, 2000, at about 9:00 p.m., Yamaji, aged 16, murdered his 50-year-old mother in their shared apartment. According to Yamaji, his mother had made a silent call to a woman her son was romantically interested in, which caused an argument after Yamaji found out. Eventually, the argument shifted towards the family's debts, during which Yamaji retrieved a metal baseball bat and beat his mother to death. She died of blunt force trauma to the head and chest.

Yamaji did not report the murder for the following day, during which he did newspaper delivery jobs as usual. On July 31, at about 1:00 a.m., he called emergency services and confessed to killing his mother. Police arrived at the apartment, found the body, and arrested him. In custody, Yamaji showed signs of remorse, but also refused to apologise for the murder, as he blamed his mother for his lack of friends, claiming she neglected him.

=== Juvenile detention and release ===
Yamaji's trial was held at Yamaguchi Family Court. On September 14, 2000, it was decided that Yamaji should be placed in a juvenile training school in Okayama, due to mitigating factors such as his lack of previous acts of juvenile delinquency and his disadvantaged familial background. As Yamaji was a minor at the time of the murder, his name was not reported and he was instead referred to by the alias initial "Y" . He received provisional release in October 2003 and full release in April 2004.

While at the training school, Yamaji was diagnosed with a pervasive developmental disorder, later specified as Asperger syndrome. However, a reassessment following the murder of the Uehara sisters determined that Yamaji instead had several personality disorders, including antisocial personality disorder, schizotypal personality disorder, and sexual sadism disorder. At the time of Yamaji's release, a psychiatrist at the training school stated that interactions with him gave the impression that Yamaji "doesn't really care about obeying the law".

Upon his release, Yamaji briefly worked at a pachinko parlor in Shimonoseki before quitting in April 2004. In February 2005, Yamaji joined a gang of thieves who stole money from pachinko machines, living with the group at a shared apartment. In the following months, the group moved to Fukuoka, then Osaka where, in November 2005, Yamaji cut ties with his accomplices, as he was unhappy with his share of the stolen money. He subsequently lived homeless, sleeping rough in parks and temples. During the investigation for the double murder, Yamaji admitted that he underwent spontaneous ejaculation while killing his mother and had hoped that killing again would provide him with the same experience, since he believed he had no other prospects in life.

=== Double homicide ===
On November 17, 2005, Yamaji raped and murdered a 27-year-old Asuka Uehara and her 19-year-old sister, Chihiro, with a knife, in Naniwa-ku, Osaka. He then set fire to their apartment and fled. The two victims had never met Yamaji before. He was arrested on December 5, 2005. While in custody, he stated to the Osaka police, "I could not forget the feeling when I killed my mother, and wanted to see human blood."

=== Sentence ===
On December 13, 2006, the Osaka District Court sentenced him to death. His defense launched an appeal, but according to his lawyers he retracted it since he was reluctant to pursue leniency. He was executed at the Osaka Detention House alongside serial killer Hiroshi Maeue on July 28, 2009.

== See also ==
- List of executions in Japan
- List of serial killers by country
- Matricide
- Volunteer (capital punishment)
