= Otaku =

Someone highly interested in anime and manga

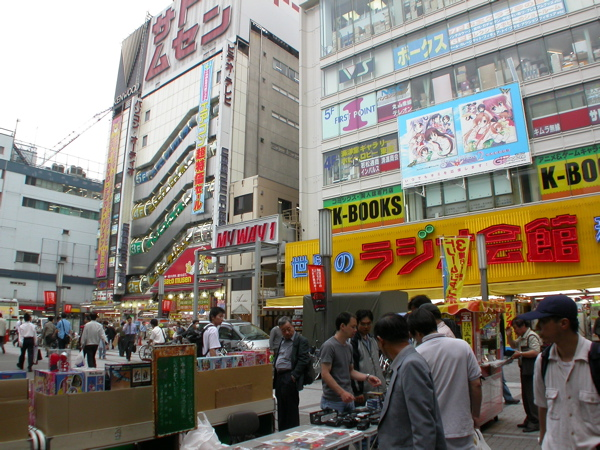
The Akihabara neighborhood of Tokyo, a popular gathering site for otaku

Otaku (Japanese: おたく, オタク, or ヲタク) is a Japanese consumer subculture of people with interests and hobbies that lie at the juncture of science and fantasy, especially media, productions, and pastimes such as anime, manga, video games, virtual reality, and cosplay. It began forming in the 1960s, took on its name within the subculture in the 1970s, and was popularized by a 1983 essay by Akio Nakamori in Manga Burikko.

Otaku subculture is a central theme of various anime, manga, documentaries, and academic research. The subculture took shape in the '60s with the release of the manga series Astro Boy and by the '70s led fans of anime such as Space Battleship Yamato to create their own manga, called doujinshi, which they began sharing at conventions such as Comic Market, addressing one another by the formal term otaku (you or your home). In the '80s, social changes promoted otaku traits even in Japanese schools, including juku, but increasingly left otaku resigned to being stereotyped as social outcasts and finding refuge in fictional worlds typified by the anime series Mobile Suit Gundam. The rise of the internet and 1989 creation of the Web furthered the otaku subculture, spreading more anime, video games, and other such media, and the term's definition expanded into numerous classifications.

Otaku may be used as a pejorative, and discrimination against it was particularly intense between 1989 (when a serial murder suspect, Tsutomu Miyazaki, "The Otaku Murderer," was arrested) and the mid-1990s. More recent studies, however, reveal an increasingly benign view of the subculture, and a growing number of people, especially the young, now identify themselves as otaku, both in Japan and elsewhere. Out of 137,734 teens surveyed in Japan in 2013, for example, 42.2% self-identified as a type of otaku. In 2005, the Nomura Research Institute divided otaku into twelve groups and estimated the size and market impact of each of these groups. Other institutions have split it further or focused on a single otaku interest, such as anime, manga, gaming, photography, electronics, J-idol, and automobiles. In 2005, the economic impact of otaku by this broad characterization was estimated to be as high as ¥2 trillion (US$18 billion).

== Etymology ==
Otaku is derived from a Japanese term for another person's house or family (お宅, otaku). The word can be used metaphorically as a part of honorific speech in Japanese, as a second-person pronoun. In this usage, its literal translation is "you". It is associated with some dialects of Western Japanese and with housewives, and is less direct and more distant than intimate pronouns, such as anata, and masculine pronouns, such as kimi and omae.

The origin of the pronoun's use among 1980s manga and anime fans is unclear. Science fiction fans were using otaku to address owners of books by the late 1960s (in a sense of "Do[es] [your home] own this book?"). Social critic Eiji Ōtsuka posits that otaku was used because it allowed people meeting for the first time, such as at a convention, to interact from a comfortable distance. One theory posits that otaku was popularized as a pronoun by science fiction author Motoko Arai in a 1981 essay in Variety magazine, and another posits that it was popularized by fans of anime studio Gainax, some of whose founders came from Tottori Prefecture in western Japan (where otaku is commonly used). The pronoun was also used in the popular anime Macross, first aired in 1982, by the characters Hikaru Ichijyo and Lynn Minmay, who address each other as otaku until they get to know each other better.

The modern slang form, which is distinguished from the older usage by being written in hiragana (おたく), katakana (オタク or, less frequently, ヲタク) or rarely in rōmaji, first appeared in public discourse in the 1980s, through the work of humorist and essayist Akio Nakamori. His 1983 series 'Otaku' Research (「おたく」の研究, "Otaku" no Kenkyū), printed in the lolicon magazine Manga Burikko, applied the term as pejorative for "unpleasant" fans, attacking their supposed poor fashion sense and physical appearance in particular. Nakamori was particularly critical of "manga maniacs" drawn to cute girl characters, and explained his label otaku as the term of address used between junior high school kids at manga and anime conventions.

In 1989, the case of Tsutomu Miyazaki, "The Otaku Murderer", brought the fandom, very negatively, to national attention. Miyazaki, who randomly chose and murdered four girls, had a collection of 5,763 video tapes, some containing anime and slasher films that were found interspersed with videos and pictures of his victims. Later that year, the contemporary knowledge magazine Bessatsu Takarajima dedicated its 104th issue to the topic of otaku. It was called Otaku no Hon (おたくの本, lit. The Book of Otaku) and delved into the subculture of otaku with 19 articles by otaku insiders, among them Akio Nakamori. This publication has been claimed by scholar Rudyard Pesimo to have popularized the term.

== Usage ==
In modern Japanese slang, the term otaku is mostly equivalent to "geek" or "nerd" (both in the broad sense); a technological geek would be a gijutsu otaku (技術オタク) and an academic nerd would be a bunkakei otaku (文化系オタク) or gariben (ガリ勉)), but in a more derogatory manner than used in the West. It is also applied to any fan of any particular theme, topic, hobby or form of entertainment. According to journalist Colette Bennett, "[w]hen these people are referred to as otaku, they are judged for their behaviors — and people suddenly see an 'otaku' as a person unable to relate to reality." The term thus has more of a negative association in Japanese society.

The word entered English as a loanword from the Japanese language. It is typically used to refer to a fan of anime and manga, but can also refer to Japanese video games or even Japanese culture in general. Non-Japanese media like American magazine Otaku USA popularize and cover these aspects. The usage of the word is a source of contention among some fans, owing to its negative connotations and stereotyping of the fandom. Widespread English exposure to the term came in 1988 with the release of Gunbuster, which refers to anime fans as otaku. Gunbuster was released officially in English in March 1990. The term's usage spread throughout the Usenet group rec.arts.anime with discussions about Otaku no Video's portrayal of otaku before its 1994 English release. Positive and negative aspects, including the pejorative usage, were intermixed. The term was also popularized by William Gibson's 1996 novel Idoru, which references otaku.

== Subculture ==
Kaichirō Morikawa identifies the subculture as distinctly Japanese, a product of the school system and society. Japanese schools have a class structure which functions as a caste system, but clubs are an exception to the social hierarchy. In these clubs, a student's interests will be recognized and nurtured, catering to the interests of otaku. Secondly, the vertical structure of Japanese society identifies the value of individuals by their success. Until the late 1980s, unathletic and unattractive males focused on academics, hoping to secure a good job and marry to raise their social standing. Those unable to succeed socially focused instead on their interests, often into adulthood, with their lifestyle centering on those interests, furthering the creation of the otaku subculture.

Even prior to the coinage of the term, the stereotypical traits of the subculture were identified in a 1981 issue of Fan Rōdo (Fan road) about "culture clubs". These individuals were drawn to anime, a counter-culture, with the release of hard science fiction works such as Mobile Suit Gundam. These works allowed a congregation and development of obsessive interests that turned anime into a medium for unpopular students, catering to obsessed fans. After these fans discovered Comic Market, the term was used as a self-confirming and self-mocking collective identity.

The 1989 "Otaku Murderer" case gave the fandom a negative connotation from which it has not fully recovered. The perception of otaku was again damaged in late 2004 when Kaoru Kobayashi kidnapped, sexually assaulted, and murdered a seven-year-old first-grade student. Japanese journalist Akihiro Ōtani suspected that Kobayashi's crime was committed by a member of the figure moe zoku even before his arrest. Although Kobayashi was not an otaku, the degree of social hostility against otaku increased. Otaku were seen by law enforcement as possible suspects for sex crimes, and local governments called for stricter laws controlling the depiction of eroticism in otaku materials.

Not all attention has been negative. In his book Otaku, Hiroki Azuma observed: "Between 2001 and 2007, the otaku forms and markets quite rapidly won social recognition in Japan", citing the fact that "[i]n 2003, Hayao Miyazaki won the Academy Award for his Spirited Away; around the same time Takashi Murakami achieved recognition for otaku-like designs; in 2004, the Japanese pavilion in the 2004 International Architecture exhibition of the Venice Biennale (Biennale Architecture) featured 'otaku'. In 2005, the word moe — one of the keywords of the present volume — was chosen as one of the top ten 'buzzwords of the year'." In 2013, a Japanese study of 137,734 people found that 42.2% self-identify as a type of otaku. This study suggests that the stigma of the word has vanished, and the term has been embraced by many. Marie Kondo told ForbesWomen in 2020: "I credit being an otaku with helping me to focus deeply, which definitely contributed to my success."

In the early 1990s, the otaku subculture started to gain traction in the Western world. According to Lawrence Eng, the first anime that could have caused this to happen was Gunbuster, and the protagonist, Noriko Takaya, is teased about her otaku behavior. Through Gunbuster, Western audiences would learn about the word otaku. In the late 1990s, otaku was a popular subculture among Generation Xers in the United States. In the early 2000s, the otaku community in the United States often consisted of suburban young people and niche online groups.

=== Places ===
The district of Akihabara in Tokyo, where there are maid cafés featuring waitresses who dress up and act like maids or anime characters, is a notable attraction center for otaku. Akihabara also has dozens of stores specializing in anime, manga, retro video games, figurines, card games, and other collectibles. Another popular location is Otome Road in Ikebukuro, Tokyo. Students from Nagoya City University started a project to help promote hidden tourist attractions and attract more otaku to Nagoya.

=== Subtypes ===
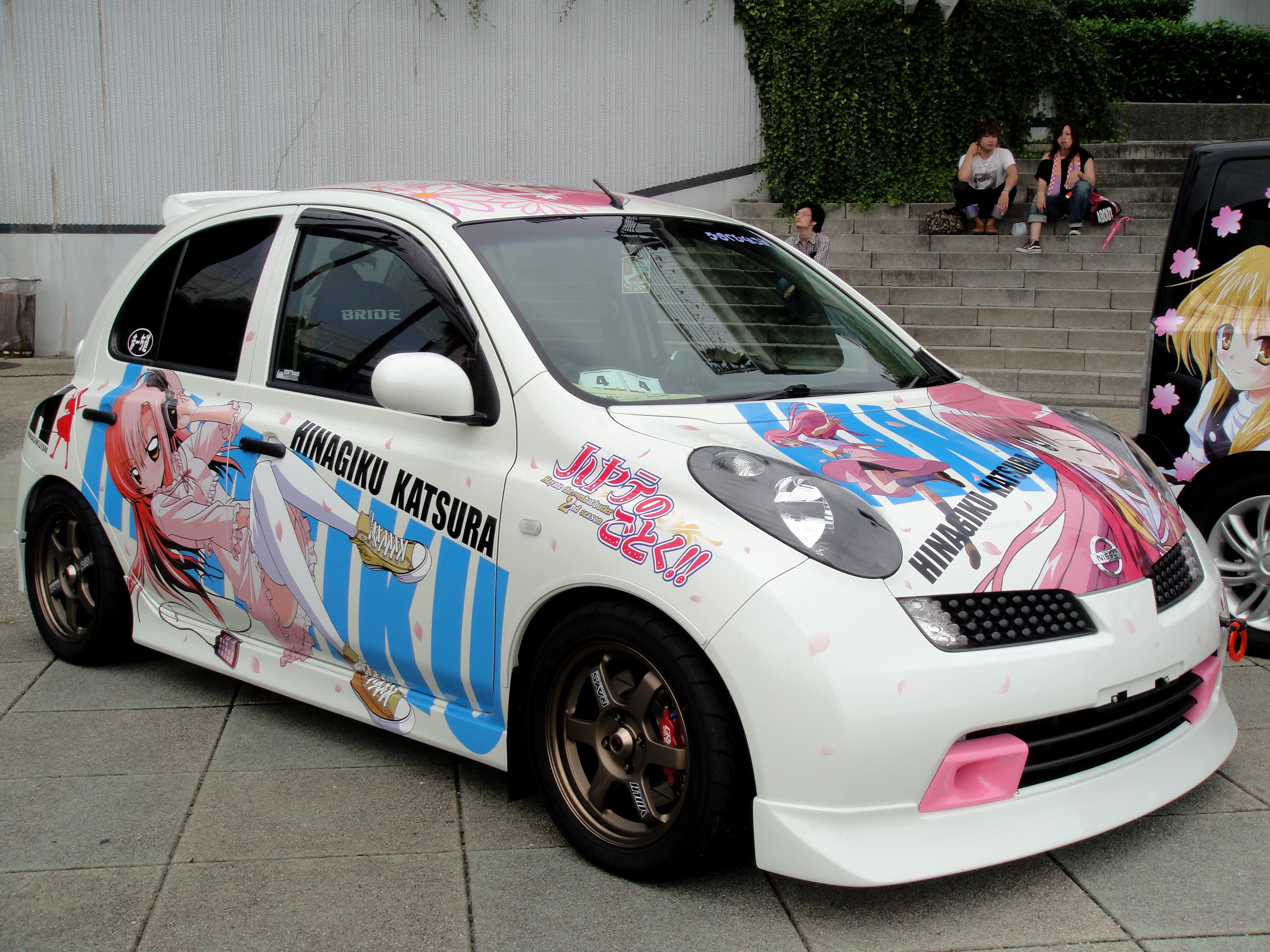
A Nissan March featuring Hinagiku Katsura from the manga series Hayate the Combat Butler

There are specific terms for different types of otaku, including fujoshi (腐女子; lit. "rotten girl(s)"), a self-mockingly pejorative Japanese term for female fans of yaoi, which focuses on homosexual male relationships. Reki-jo are female otaku who are interested in Japanese history. Some terms refer to a location, such as Akiba-kei ("Akihabara-style"), which applies to those familiar with Akihabara's culture.

Miyadai describes two big subtypes of the otaku type, a world type and a battle royale type. There is a chronological development from the world type of the late 1990s to the battle royale type of the 2000s but they also coexisted. The antagonism between the world type and the battle royale type emerged in the age in which reality and fiction are regarded as equivalent tools for self-defense. He further describes the internet society as a rhizomic structure which invalidates the distinction between "reality" and "fiction". The world type treats fiction as an equivalent of reality (real-ization of fiction), while the battle royale type treats reality as an equivalent of fiction (fictionalization of reality).

=== Media ===
Otaku often participate in self-mocking through the production or interest in humor directed at their subculture. Anime and manga otaku are the subject of numerous self-critical works, such as Otaku no Video, which contains a live-interview mockumentary that pokes fun at the otaku subculture and includes Gainax's own staff as the interviewees. Other works depict otaku subculture less critically, such as Genshiken and Comic Party. A well-known light novel, which later received a manga and anime adaptation, is Welcome to the N.H.K., which focuses on otaku subcultures and highlights other social outcasts, such as hikikomori and NEETs. Works that focus on otaku characters include WataMote, the story of an unattractive and unsociable otome gamer otaku who exhibits delusions about her social status; and No More Heroes, a video game about an otaku assassin named Travis Touchdown and his surrealistic adventures inspired by anime and manga. Media about otaku also exist outside of Japan, such as the American documentary Otaku Unite! which focuses on the American side of the otaku culture, and the Filipino novel Otaku Girl, which tells the story of a virtual reality world where otaku can role-play and use the powers of their favorite anime characters.

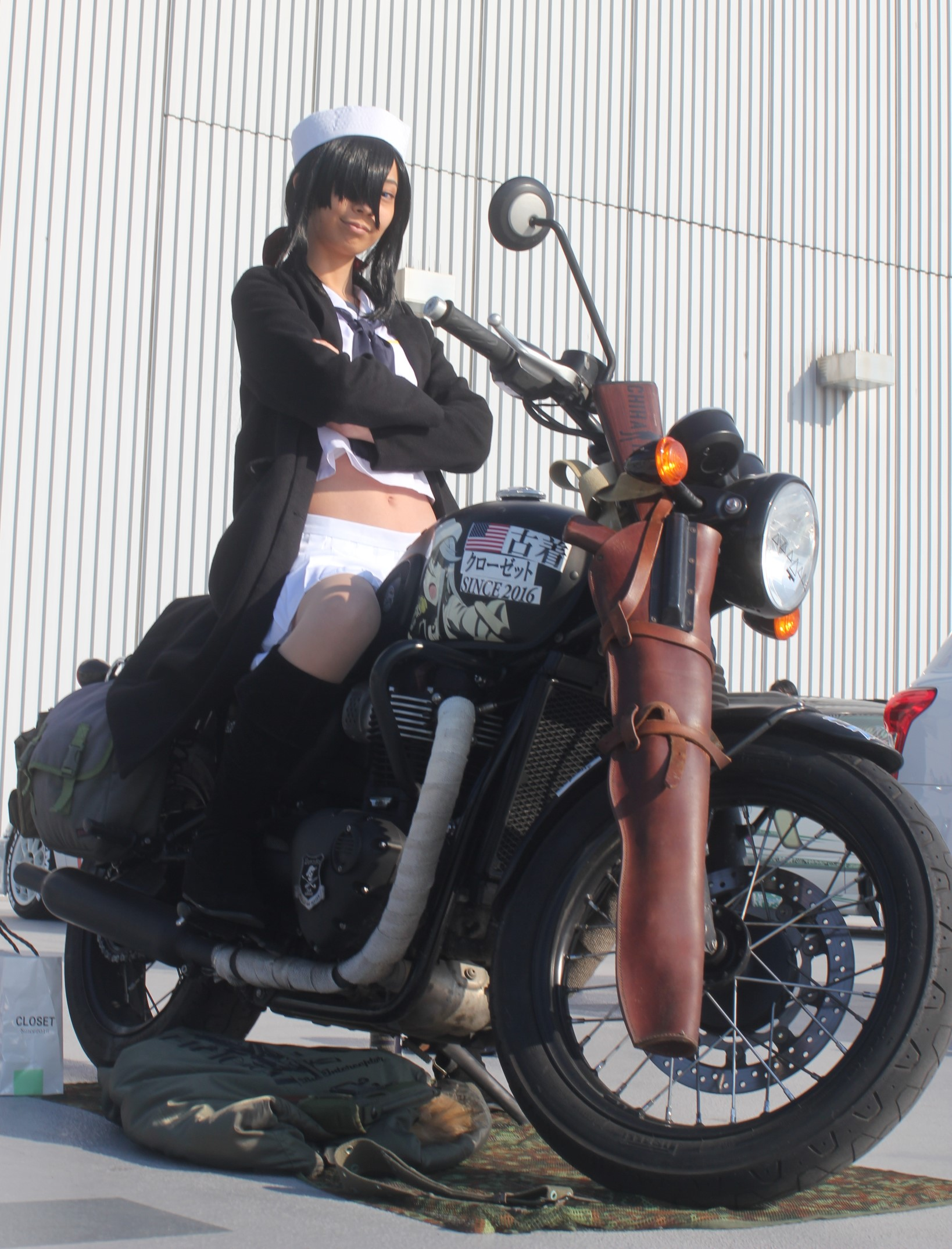
Girls und Panzer cosplayers take photos in the itasha exhibition area of the doujinshi convention.

=== Habits ===
A term used in the otaku fandom is wotagei or otagei (ヲタ芸 or オタ芸), a type of cheering performed as a group. Another term is itasha (痛車; literally "painful (i.e. cringeworthy) car(s)"), which describes vehicles decorated with fictional characters, especially bishōjo game or eroge characters.

== Classification ==
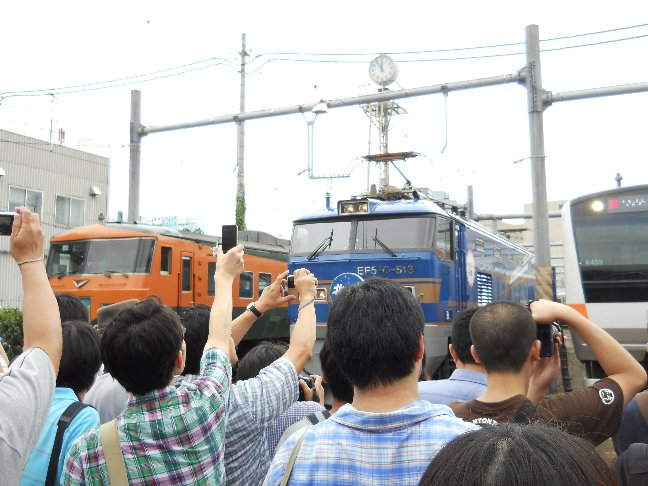
Anoraks taking photos of trains at an annual depot open-day event in Tokyo in August 2011

The Nomura Research Institute (NRI) has made two major studies into otaku, the first in 2004 and a revised study with a more specific definition in 2005. The 2005 study defines twelve major fields of otaku interests. Of these groups:

Estimates concerning the otaku market scale (2004)
Field	Population	Market Scale
Manga	350,000	¥83 billion
Idols	280,000	¥61 billion
Travel	250,000	¥81 billion
PC	190,000	¥36 billion
Games	160,000	¥21 billion
Autos	140,000	¥54 billion
Anime	110,000	¥20 billion
Mobile Devices	70,000	¥8 billion
AV equipment	60,000	¥12 billion
Cameras	50,000	¥18 billion
Fashion	40,000	¥13 billion
Railways	20,000	¥4 billion

These values were partially released with a much higher estimation in 2004, but this definition focused on consumerism and not the "unique psychological characteristics" of otaku used in the 2005 study.

The NRI's 2005 study also put forth five archetypes of otaku:

- The first is the family-oriented otaku, who has broad interests and is more mature than other otaku; their object of interest is secretive and they are "closet otaku".
- The second is the serious "leaving my own mark on the world" otaku, with interests in mechanical or business personality fields.
- The third type is the "media-sensitive multiple interest" otaku, whose diverse interests are shared with others.
- The fourth type is the "outgoing and assertive otaku", who gain recognition by promoting their hobby.
- The last is the "fan magazine-obsessed otaku", which is predominately female with a small group of males being the "moe type"; their secret hobby is focused on the production or interest in fan works.

The Hamagin Research Institute found that moe-related content was worth ¥88.8 billion ($807 million) in 2005, and one analyst estimated the market could be as much as ¥2 trillion ($18 billion). Japan-based Tokyo Otaku Mode, a place for news related to otaku, has been liked on Facebook almost 10 million times.

Other classifications of otaku interests include Vocaloid, cosplay, figures, and professional wrestling, as categorized by the Yano Research Institute, which reports and tracks market growth and trends in sectors heavily influenced by otaku consumerism. In 2012, it noted around 30% of growth in dating sim and online gaming otaku, while Vocaloid, cosplay, idols and maid services grew by 10%, confirming its 2011 predictions.

=== Ōkina otomodachi ===
Ōkina otomodachi (大きなお友達) is a Japanese phrase that literally translates to "big friend" or "adult friend". Japanese otaku use it to describe themselves as adult fans of an anime, a manga, or a TV show that is originally aimed at children. A parent who watches such a show with their children is not considered an ōkina otomodachi, nor is a parent who buys anime DVDs or manga volumes for their children; ōkina otomodachi are those who consume such content by themselves.

== Otaku outside Japan ==
Based on a survey with 1,800 responses conducted by Dentsu in July 2022, an extrapolated 34% of American Gen-Zs (around 15 million people) identify themselves as anime otaku.

Kim Morrissy of the media company Crunchyroll wrote that, in the anime fandom, some Westerners believe that identifying as an otaku constitutes cultural appropriation, and that it can only refer to a Japanese person.

== Anti-otaku sentiment ==
"Anti-otaku sentiment" or "anti-otaku discrimination" (オタク差別; lit. "otaku discrimination") refers to social exclusion, prejudice, and hatred of otaku. Some critics have analyzed that discrimination against marginalized groups (otaku) in Japanese society creates anti-otaku discrimination.

== See also ==
- Daicon III and IV Opening Animations – 1981 and 1983 anime short films
- Hentai – Anime and manga pornography
- Japanese language – Japonic language
- Japanification – Process of becoming or wishing to become a member of Japanese society
- Japanophilia – Affinity for Japanese culture
- Moe – Affection for manga and anime characters
- Nijikon – Attraction to two-dimensional characters
- Waifu – Fictional character that one feels attraction to
