= October 2021 Tokyo attack =

2021 stabbing attacks committed on a train in Tokyo

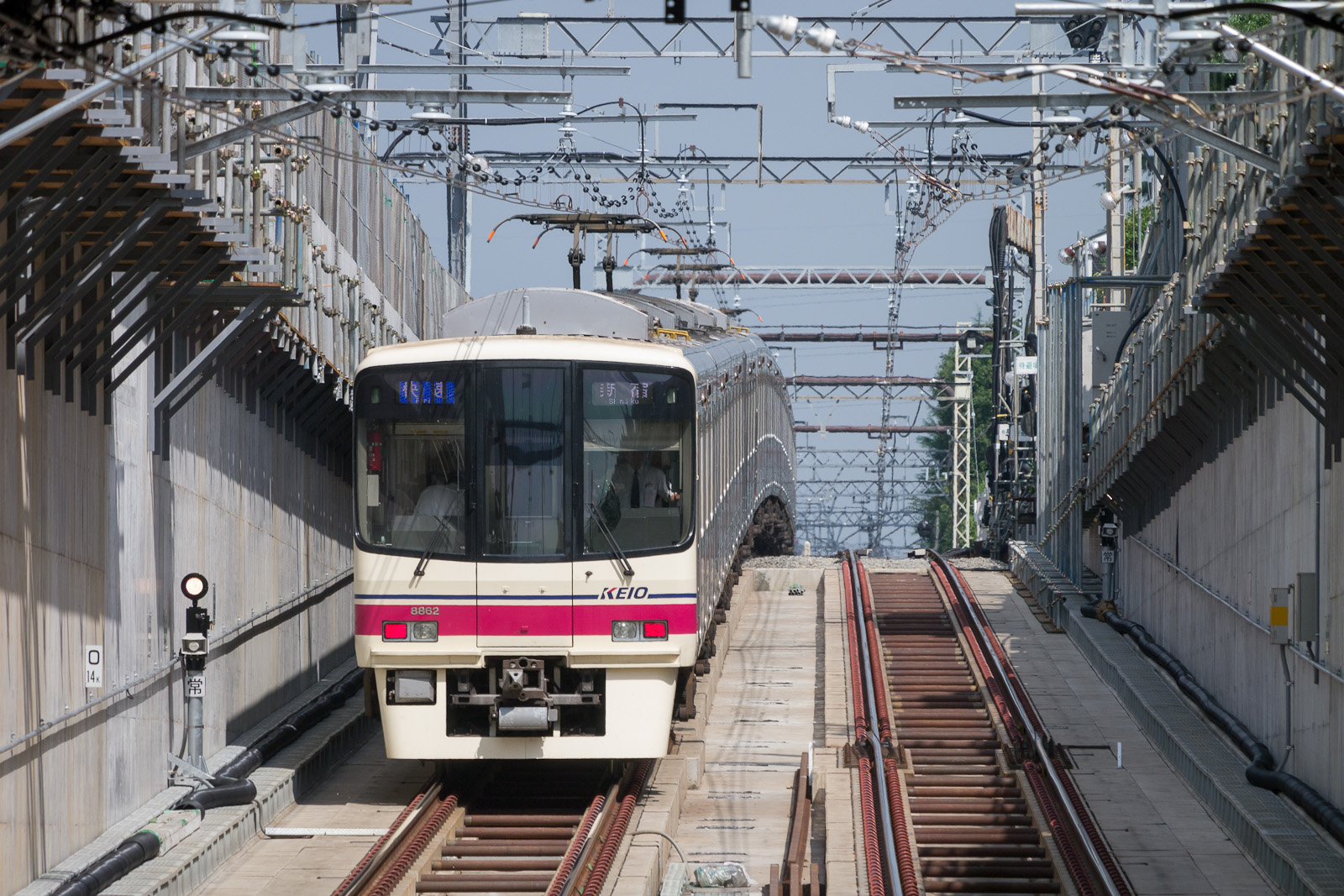
- A Keiō Line train
- Location: Chōfu, Tokyo, Japan
- Date: 31 October 2021 around 8:00 p.m. (JST)
- Target: Civilians
- Attack type: Stabbing, arson, Acid attack
- Weapons: Knife, hydrochloric acid
- Deaths: 0
- Injuries: 17 (1 by stabbing)
- Motive: To receive the death penalty because the suspect hated his life
- Verdict: 23-year imprisonment
- Convictions: Attempted murder (17 counts); Arson
- Convicted: Kyota Hattori

At around 8 p.m. JST on 31 October 2021, 24-year-old Kyota Hattori carried out a knife and arson attack on a Keiō Railway train as it was travelling to Kokuryō Station on the Keiō Line in Chōfu, a city in the western suburbs of Tokyo, Japan. He injured 17 people, one critically. Japanese authorities later identified Hattori and he was arrested at the scene.

Hattori stated that he was referring to the Tokyo stabbings, which occurred on 6 August 2021. In response to these incidents, MLIT has decided to require railroad operators to install security cameras in all new trains.

== Incident ==
The attack began as Hattori, dressed in clothing similar to that of the Joker character from the Batman franchise, reportedly sprayed pesticide into the eyes of a 72-year-old man sitting next to him on the train, before stabbing him in the chest. He then moved to another car and spread lighter fluid across the car in order to start a fire. Some of the passengers thought the attacker was part of a Halloween stunt, until other passengers began fleeing and Hattori began waving a long bloody knife.

As the Special Express train passed through Fuda Station, one of the passengers pressed the emergency alarm; in response, the train planned to make an emergency stop at Kokuryō Station. While the train was approaching Kokuryō Station, the emergency door release handle was pulled, causing the train to stop 2 m (6.6 ft) to 3 m (9.8 ft) before its proper parking position. As the train was coming to a stop, footage recorded by a passenger showed other passengers fleeing to one end of the train as the fire ignited by the attacker erupted in one of the cars. After the train had come to a stop, passengers opened the train's windows and climbed out to escape.

== Perpetrator ==
After being arrested, the 24-year-old suspect was identified as Kyota Hattori. He allegedly told officers that he wanted to die after having work problems in June 2021 and that he was no longer getting along with his friends. He allegedly stated that if he had killed at least two people, he would receive the death penalty.

== Attempted recreation ==
Eight days later on 8 November 2021, a 69-year-old man from Fukuoka attempted to set a Sakura Shinkansen service on fire. Although no casualties were reported, the man claimed that the motive of the attack was to replicate the attacks done in Tokyo the week before. The perpetrator was then arrested after the train made an emergency stop at Shin-Yatsushiro Station.

== Legal proceedings ==
Hattori underwent a three-month psychiatric examination which was used to determine that he could be held criminally responsible for the attack. Prosecutors then indicted him in March 2022.

On 26 June 2023, the first hearing of Hattori's actions was held. He was charged with attempting to murder a 72-year-old male passenger by stabbing in the chest and 12 others by setting fire. Hattori refuted that he intended to set fire to kill people, and pleaded not guilty to that charge.

Hattori was reportedly inspired by the actions of Yusuke Tsushima, who stabbed several passengers in a Tokyo train and set the train on fire in August 2021. Hattori was facing an internal transfer due to a workplace issue, and was having negative thoughts after learning that his ex-girlfriend whom he lived with till autumn of 2020, the year before he committed his act, was getting married.

On 31 July 2023, Hattori was found guilty of attempted murder and arson, and sentenced to 23 years in prison.

== See also ==
- August 2021 Tokyo stabbings
- 2012 Aurora theater shooting – Mass shooting in Colorado, U.S.
