= Tsutomu Miyazaki =

Japanese serial killer and child murderer

- 宮﨑 勤
- Mugshot of Miyazaki, 1989
- Born: 21 August 1962; Itsukaichi, Tokyo, Japan
- Died: 17 June 2008 (aged 45); Tokyo Detention House, Tokyo, Japan
- Other names: Otaku Murderer, Rat Man
- Status: Executed by hanging
- Conviction: Aggravated murder (4 counts)
- Penalty: Death

Details
- Victims: 4
- Span of crimes: 1988–1989
- Country: Japan
- Locations: Saitama Prefecture and Tokyo
- Date apprehended: 23 July 1989

Tsutomu Miyazaki (宮﨑 勤, Miyazaki Tsutomu; 21 August 1962 – 17 June 2008) was a Japanese serial killer who murdered four young girls in Tokyo and Saitama Prefecture between August 1988 and June 1989. He abducted and killed the girls, aged from 4 to 7, in his car before dismembering them and molesting their corpses. He also engaged in cannibalism, preserved body parts as trophies, and taunted the families of his victims.

Miyazaki was arrested in Hachiōji in July 1989 after being confronted while taking nude photographs of a young girl. He was diagnosed as having one or more personality disorders, but was determined by authorities to be sane and aware of his crimes and their consequences. Miyazaki was sentenced to death in 1997 and was executed by hanging in 2008.

Miyazaki was dubbed the "Otaku Murderer" due to his extensive collection of anime, manga, horror videotapes and hentai as well as various other forms of pornography. This triggered a widespread moral panic against otaku in Japan, similar to the Satanic Panic in America.

== Early life ==
Tsutomu Miyazaki was born on 21 August 1962 in Itsukaichi, Tokyo, the son of a wealthy family. He was born premature and had the rare birth defect radioulnar synostosis that caused his hand joints to be fused together, making him unable to bend his wrists upwards. Miyazaki's family operated a regional newspaper company and were well known in Itsukaichi, where his grandfather and great-grandfather had served on the town council. Due to his parents being busy, he was mainly raised by his grandfather and an intellectually disabled man the family hired as a nanny.

Miyazaki was ostracized when he attended elementary school due to his deformity, and consequently kept to himself. He attended Meidai Nakano High School in Nakano, a prestigious high school associated with Meiji University, and was a star student until his grades began to drop dramatically. He was ranked 40 out of 56 in his class and did not receive the customary admission to Meiji University for students of the school. Instead of studying English and becoming a teacher as he originally intended, Miyazaki attended a local junior college and studied to become a photography technician.

In the mid-1980s, Miyazaki moved back into his parents' house in Itsukaichi, sharing a room with his elder sister. Although his family was highly influential in Itsukaichi, he expressed no desire to take over their business. After his arrest, Miyazaki would say that what he really craved was "being listened to about his problems" but believed that his parents, more worried about the material than the sentimental, "would have not heard [him]; [he] would've been ignored". In the same confession, he said that by this period in his life he had begun to consider suicide. Miyazaki felt he only received support from his grandfather, to whom he was close, and was rejected by his two younger sisters.

In May 1988, Miyazaki's grandfather died, which served to deepen his depression and isolate him even further. In an attempt to "retain something from him", Miyazaki ate part of his grandfather's ashes. A few weeks later, one of Miyazaki's sisters caught him watching her while she was taking a shower; he attacked her when she told him to leave. When his mother learned of the incident and demanded that he spend more time working and less time with his videotapes, he attacked her as well.

== Murders ==
Between August 1988 and June 1989, Miyazaki mutilated and murdered four girls between the ages of 4 and 7, and sexually molested their corpses; these crimes became known as the Little Girl Murders. He drank the blood of one victim and ate a part of her hand. These crimes—which prior to Miyazaki's apprehension were named the Little Girl Murders and later the Tokyo/Saitama Serial Kidnapping Murders of Little Girls (東京・埼玉連続幼女誘拐殺人事件, Tōkyō Saitama renzoku yōjo yūkai satsujin jiken)—shocked Saitama Prefecture, which had few crimes against children.

On 22 August 1988, one day after Miyazaki's 26th birthday, Mari Konno, aged 4, vanished while playing at a friend's house. Miyazaki had led Konno into his black Nissan Langley, then drove westward of Tokyo and parked the car under a bridge in a wooded area. There, he sat alongside Konno for half an hour before murdering her and molesting her corpse. He dumped her body in the hills near his home, departing with her clothes, then allowed the body to decompose before returning to remove her hands and feet, which he kept in his closet. Miyazaki burned Konno's remaining bones in his furnace, ground them into powder, and sent them to her family in a box along with several of her teeth, photos of her clothes, and a postcard which read, 「真理さん、骨、火葬、調査して、証明して」 ("Mari. Bones. Cremated. Investigate. Prove.") Konno's hands and feet were found in Miyazaki's closet after his arrest almost a year later.

On 3 October 1988, Miyazaki abducted Masami Yoshizawa, aged 7, after spotting her while driving along a rural road. He had offered Yoshizawa a ride, which she accepted, then drove her to the same place he had killed Konno. Miyazaki killed Yoshizawa, engaged in sexual acts with her corpse, and took her clothes with him when he departed.

On 12 December 1988, he abducted Erika Namba, aged 4, as she was returning home from a friend's house. Miyazaki forced her into his car and drove to a parking lot in Naguri, where he forced her to remove her clothes in the back seat and began to take pictures of her. He killed Namba, tied her hands and feet behind her back, covered her with a bedsheet, and placed her body in his car's trunk. He disposed of her clothes in a wooded area and left her body in the adjoining parking lot, where it was discovered three days later. On 20 December, Namba's family received a postcard sent by Miyazaki with a message assembled using words cut out of magazines: 「絵梨香、かぜ、せき、のど、楽、死 」 ("Erika. Cold. Cough. Throat. Rest. Death.")

On 6 June 1989, Miyazaki convinced Ayako Nomoto, aged 5, to allow him to take pictures of her. He then led Nomoto into his car and murdered her, covered her corpse with a bedsheet and placed her in his trunk. Miyazaki took the corpse into his apartment and spent the next two days engaging in sexual acts with her body, taking photos and videos of the remains in various positions. When Nomoto's corpse began to decompose, Miyazaki dismembered it, abandoning her torso in a cemetery and her head in the nearby hills. He kept her hands, drinking blood from and cannibalizing them. Fearing that the police would find Nomoto's body parts, Miyazaki returned to the cemetery and the hills two weeks later and carried the remains back to his apartment, where he hid them in his closet.

== Arrest ==
On 23 July 1989, Miyazaki saw two sisters playing in a park in Hachiōji and managed to separate the younger of the sisters from the older one, who stayed behind. He was taking photographs of the younger one, whom he had convinced to strip nude, when he was caught by their father, who attacked Miyazaki but was unable to restrain him. After fleeing on foot, Miyazaki eventually returned to the park to retrieve his car, whereupon he was arrested by police responding to a call by the father. A search of his two-room bungalow produced 5,763 videotapes, some containing anime and slasher films (later used as reasoning for his crimes). Interspersed among them was video footage and photos of his victims. Miyazaki, who retained a perpetually calm and collected demeanor during his trial, appeared indifferent to his capture.

== Moral panic ==
Japanese media dubbed Miyazaki the "Otaku Murderer", in reference to otaku culture. His killings caused a moral panic against otaku, with speculation that anime and horror films had made him a murderer. Various newspapers claimed that Miyazaki had retreated into a fantasy world of manga as a result of his neglected upbringing. Keigo Okonogi, a psychoanalyst at Tokyo International University, told the Shūkan Post that:

The danger of a whole generation of youth who do not even experience the most primary two- or three-way relationship between themselves and their mother and father, and who cannot make the transition from a fantasy world of videos and manga to reality, is now extreme.

These reports were disputed. In Eiji Ōtsuka's book on Miyazaki's crimes, he argued that Miyazaki's collection of pornography was probably added or amended by a photographer in order to highlight his perversity. Another critic, Fumiya Ichihashi, suspected the released information played up to public stereotypes and fears about otaku, as the police knew they would help cement a conviction. Sharon Kinsella asserts that large collections of manga and videos were typical in the rooms of youths living in the Tokyo area at the time.

== Trial and execution ==
Miyazaki's trial began on 30 March 1990. Often talking nonsensically, he blamed his actions on "Rat Man", an alter ego who he claimed forced him to kill; he spent time during the trial drawing "Rat Man" in cartoon form.

The seven-year trial focused on Miyazaki's mental state at the time of the murders. Under Japanese law, people of unsound minds are not subject to punishment, and people having cognitive disability are entitled to reduced sentences. Three teams of court-appointed expert psychiatrists came to differing conclusions about Miyazaki's ability to tell right from wrong: one team determined Miyazaki to have a cognitive disability, another team thought him either schizophrenic or as having dissociative personality disorder, and the third team found that although Miyazaki definitely had at least one personality disorder, he was still capable of taking responsibility for his actions.

The Tokyo District Court judged Miyazaki aware of the magnitude and consequences of his crimes and therefore accountable. He was sentenced to death on 14 April 1997. His death sentence was upheld by both the Tokyo High Court, on 28 June 2001, and the Supreme Court of Justice on 17 January 2006.

Miyazaki described his serial murders as an "act of benevolence". Child killer Kaoru Kobayashi described himself as "the next Tsutomu Miyazaki or Mamoru Takuma", to which Miyazaki stated, "I won't allow him to call himself 'the second Tsutomu Miyazaki' when he hasn't even undergone a psychiatric examination."

Minister of Justice Kunio Hatoyama signed Miyazaki's death warrant on 17 June 2008, and he was hanged at the Tokyo Detention House that same day. Writer Ryūzō Saki observed that Miyazaki's trial was long and noted that in the end Miyazaki was "not willing to criticize [Minister of Justice] Hatoyama".

== Victims ==
1. Mari Konno (今野真理, Konno Mari), age 4, died 22 August 1988.
2. Masami Yoshizawa (吉沢正美, Yoshizawa Masami), age 7, died 3 October 1988.
3. Erika Namba (難波絵梨香, Namba Erika), age 4, died 12 December 1988.
4. Ayako Nomoto (野本綾子, Nomoto Ayako), age 5, died 6 June 1989.

== See also ==
- Capital punishment in Japan
- Child cannibalism
- Insanity defense
- List of executions in Japan
- List of serial killers by country
- Norio Nagayama
