= Japan Ground Self-Defense Force Music Corps =

Department of Japan Ground Self-Defense Force

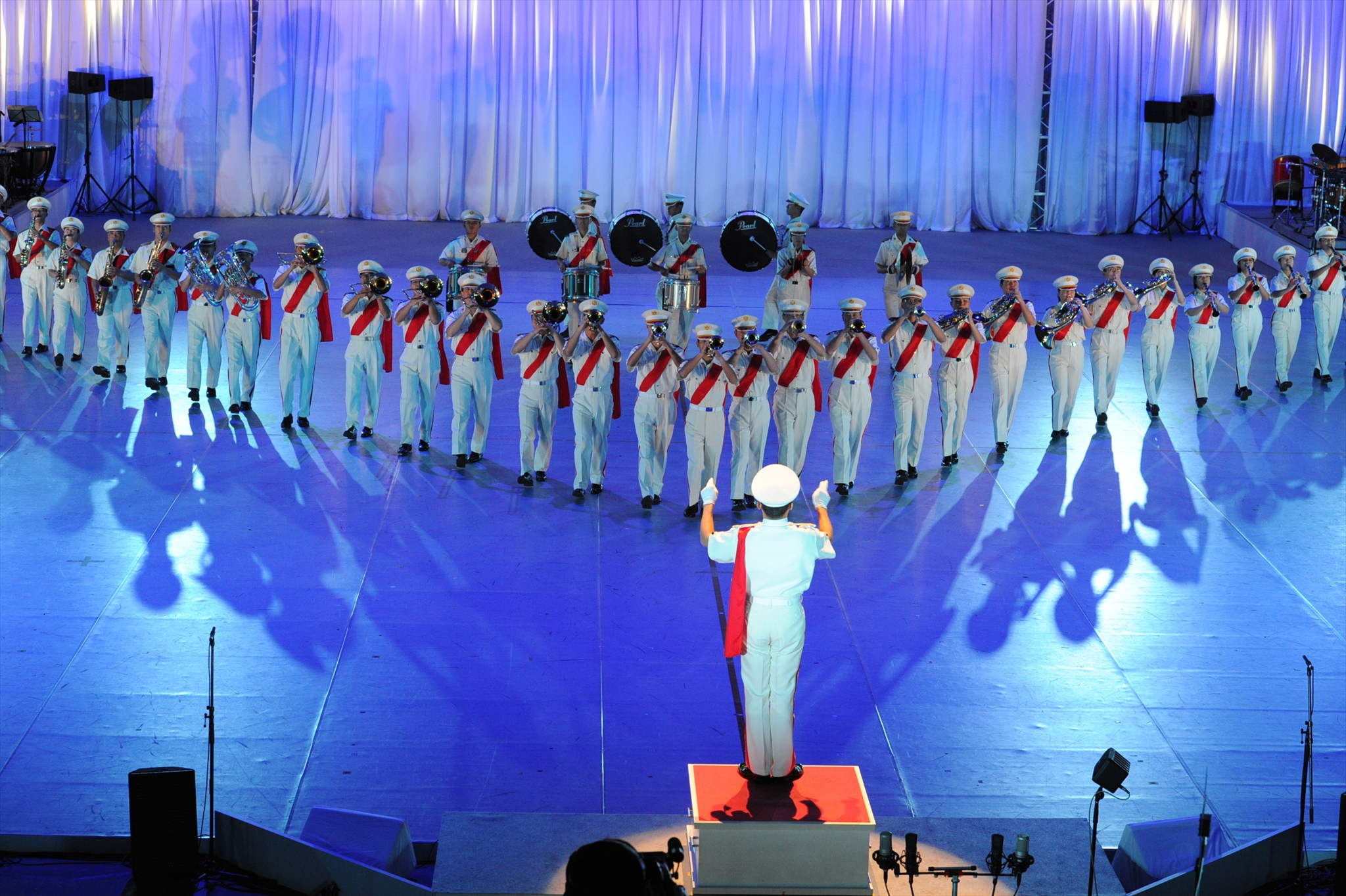
JGSDF Central Army Band at the JSDF Marching Festival 2012

The Music Corps (Japanese: 音楽隊, romanized: Ongakutai) is a department of the Japan Ground Self-Defense Force that is tasked with presiding over military bands in the JGSDF. Similarly, the Maritime Self-Defense Force and the Air Self Defense Force each have a music corps. JGSDF military bands regularly participate in international festivals and take part in national and branch-related events. It is roughly the equivalent to the Royal Corps of Army Music (CAMUS) in the British Army or the Music Branch (Canadian Forces).

== Purpose and traditions ==
The JGSDF adopted a more western style military band, which originated in Japan during the Meiji Restoration, which saw the reform of the armed forces to the standards of Western armed services. The JGSDF's bands also carry on the practice of bugle call playing, with bugle platoons present in every unit in the JGSDF using G major bugles. As a JSDF military band, the JGSDF Central Band frequently renders honors in national and local performances, including events for honoured imperial guests and official dignitaries. It is the main sponsor for the JSDF Marching Festival. The JGSDF Music Corps also occasionally performs music from well known Anime.

== Organization ==
The JGSDF Music Corps consists of the Central Band, five army bands, nine division bands and six brigade bands.

=== Central Band ===
Japan Ground Self-Defense Force Central Band
- 陸上自衛隊中央音楽隊
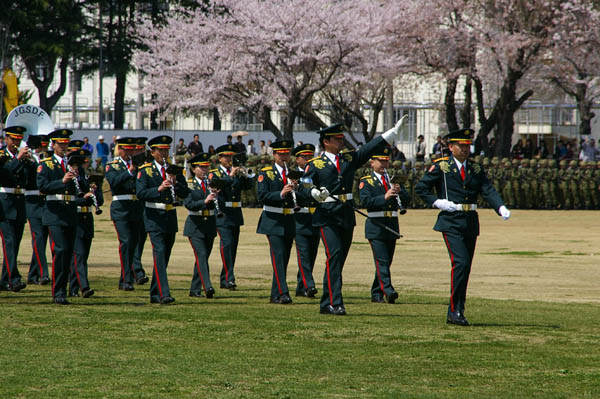
- JGSDF Central Band at Camp Narashino in 2008
- Active: June 1951 – present
- Country: Japan
- Branch: Japan Ground Self-Defense Force
- Type: Military band
- Size: About 100 personnel
- Garrison/HQ: Camp Asaka, Nerima, Tokyo

Commanders
- Current commander: Colonel Takahiro Higuchi

The Japan Ground Self-Defense Force Central Band (陸上自衛隊中央音楽隊 (Rikujō Jieitai Chūō Ongakutai)) or JGSDF Central Band is the premier military band of the Japan Self-Defense Forces. Its more senior activities consist of national ceremonies, military parades, and symphonic concerts taking place in the capital of Tokyo Metropolis. It also performs at events that also includes joint service concerts alongside other Japanese military bands such as the Maritime and Air Self-Defense Forces Central Bands. The Central Band also presides over all military bands of the Ground Self-Defense Force and is modeled on its military counterparts in the United States and the United Kingdom. The band is a directly reporting unit of the Ministry of Defense.

==== History ====
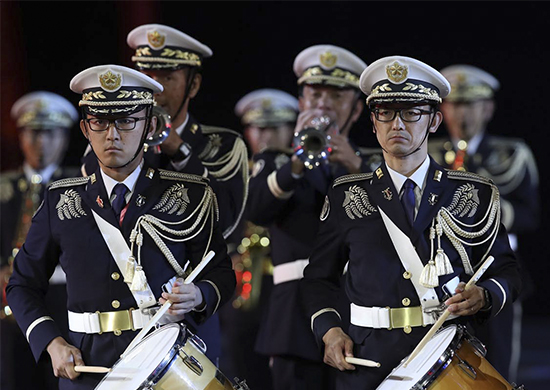
The band in Russia in 2019.

The JGSDF Band was created in the summer of 1951 under the as part of the National Police Reserve (formerly the National Safety Force), the predecessor agency of the JGSDF. With the NPR only being an armed national police force rather than a national military, the JGSDF Band was the first military band to form in modern Japan. Its history is rooted in the long heritage of Japanese military music, and more specifically the Imperial Japanese Army Band beginning in the 1880s. In the last half-century, the JGSDF Band has gained the nobility of being the senior most ground force and self-defence force wind band, serving as one of many ceremonial military and paramilitary units that serve the Emperor and the Imperial Family during state visits and other official functions. Musicians of the band have since 2015 taught personnel of the Papua New Guinea Defence Forces Band. It participated in the 2019 edition of the Spasskaya Tower Military Music Festival and Tattoo.

==== Awards and honours ====
- April 2008 – The JGSDF Central Band was honoured by the Japanese Musical Education and Culture Promotion Society with the 18th Academy Award of Band Performance
- 2009 – The Central Band was awarded the George S. Howard Citation of Musical Excellence for Military Concert Bands from the John Philip Sousa Foundation.
- 2015 – Letter of acknowledgment by Prime Minister Shinzo Abe
- August 2017 – During the 2017 Royal Edinburgh Tattoo at Edinburgh Castle, Scotland, the Central Band was awarded the Polly Sword, the award to the best-performing band in the tattoo.

=== Army bands ===
- Northern Army Band (Camp Makomanai, Sapporo, Hokkaido)
- North Eastern Army Band (Camp Sendai, Sendai, Miyagi)
- Eastern Army Band (Camp Asaka, Nerima, Tokyo)
- Central Army Band (Camp Itami, Itami, Hyōgo)
- Western Army Band (Camp Kengun, Kumamoto, Kumamoto)

=== Division bands and brigade bands ===
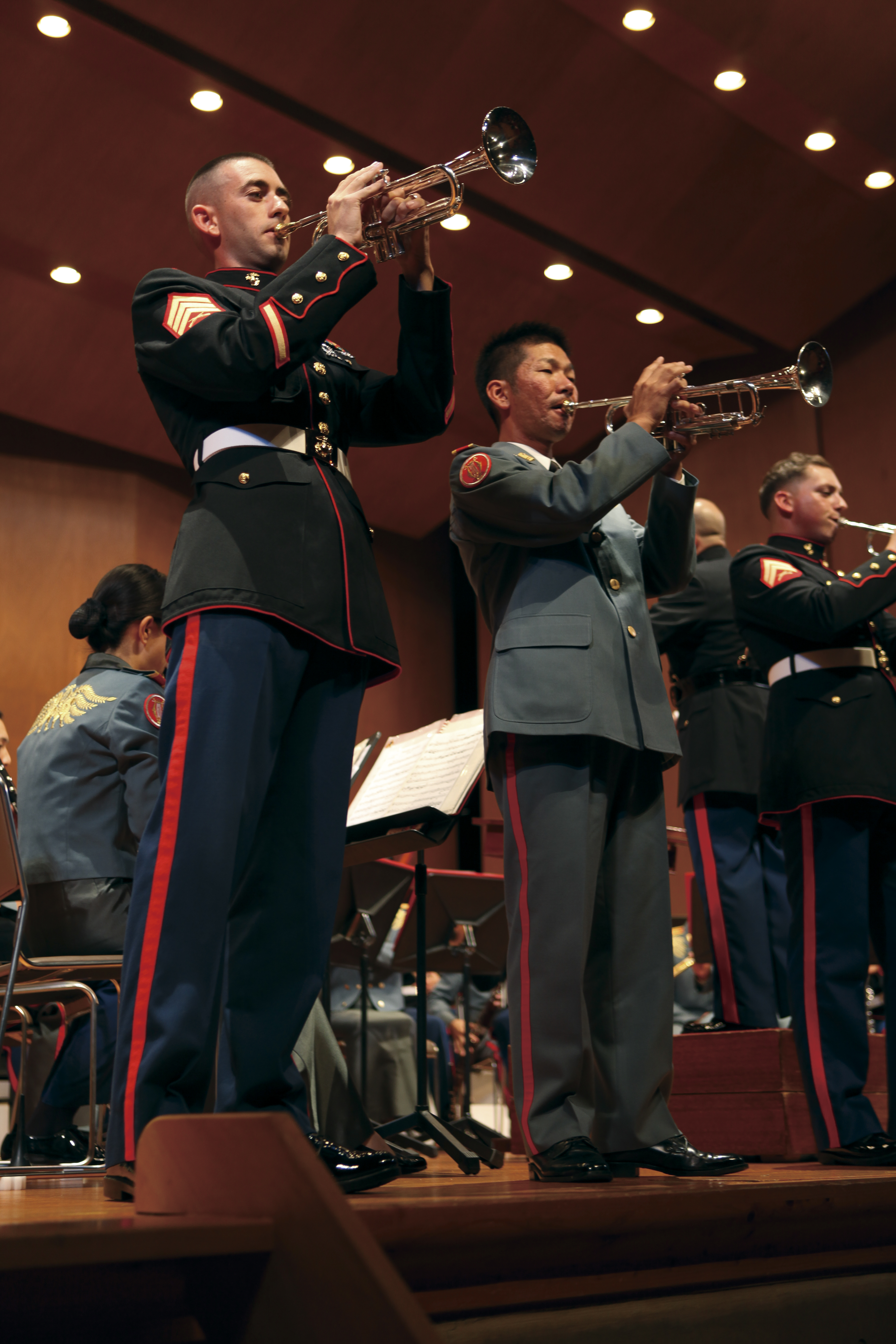
15th Band and the USMC III MEF Band

- 1st Band (Camp Nerima, Nerima, Tokyo), a part of the 1st Division
- 2nd Band (Asahikawa Air Field, Hokkaido), a part of the 2nd Division
- 3rd Band (Camp Senzo, Itami, Hyōgo), a part of the 3rd Division
- 4th Band (Camp Fukuoka, Fukuoka), a part of the 4th Division
- 5th Band (Tokachi Airfield, Obihiro, Hokkaido), a part of the 5th Brigade
- 6th Band (Camp Jinmachi, Higashine, Yamagata), a part of the 6th Division
- 7th Band (Camp Higashi-Chitose, Chitose, Hokkaido), a part of the 7th Division
- 8th Band (Camp Kita-Kumamoto, Kumamoto), a part of the 8th Division
- 9th Band (Camp Aomori, Aomori), a part of the 9th Division
- 10th Band (Camp Moriyama, Moriyama-ku, Nagoya, Aichi), a part of the 10th Division
- 11th Band (Camp Makomanai, Sapporo, Hokkaido), a part of the 11th Brigade
- 12th Band (Camp Soumagahara, Kitagunma, Gunma), a part of the 12th Brigade
- 13th Band (Camp Kaitaichi, Kaita, Hiroshima), a part of the 13th Brigade
- 14th Band (Camp Zentsuji, Zentsuji, Kagawa), a part of the 14th Brigade
- 15th Band (Camp Naha, Naha, Okinawa), a part of the 15th Brigade

== Gallery of bands ==
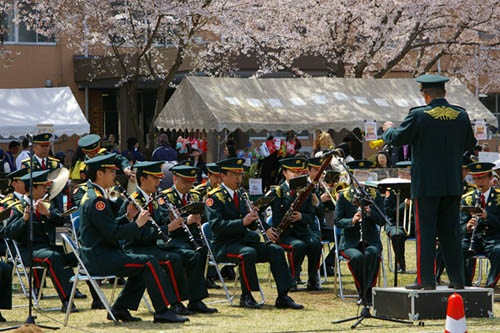
Eastern Army Band at Camp Asaka in 2008

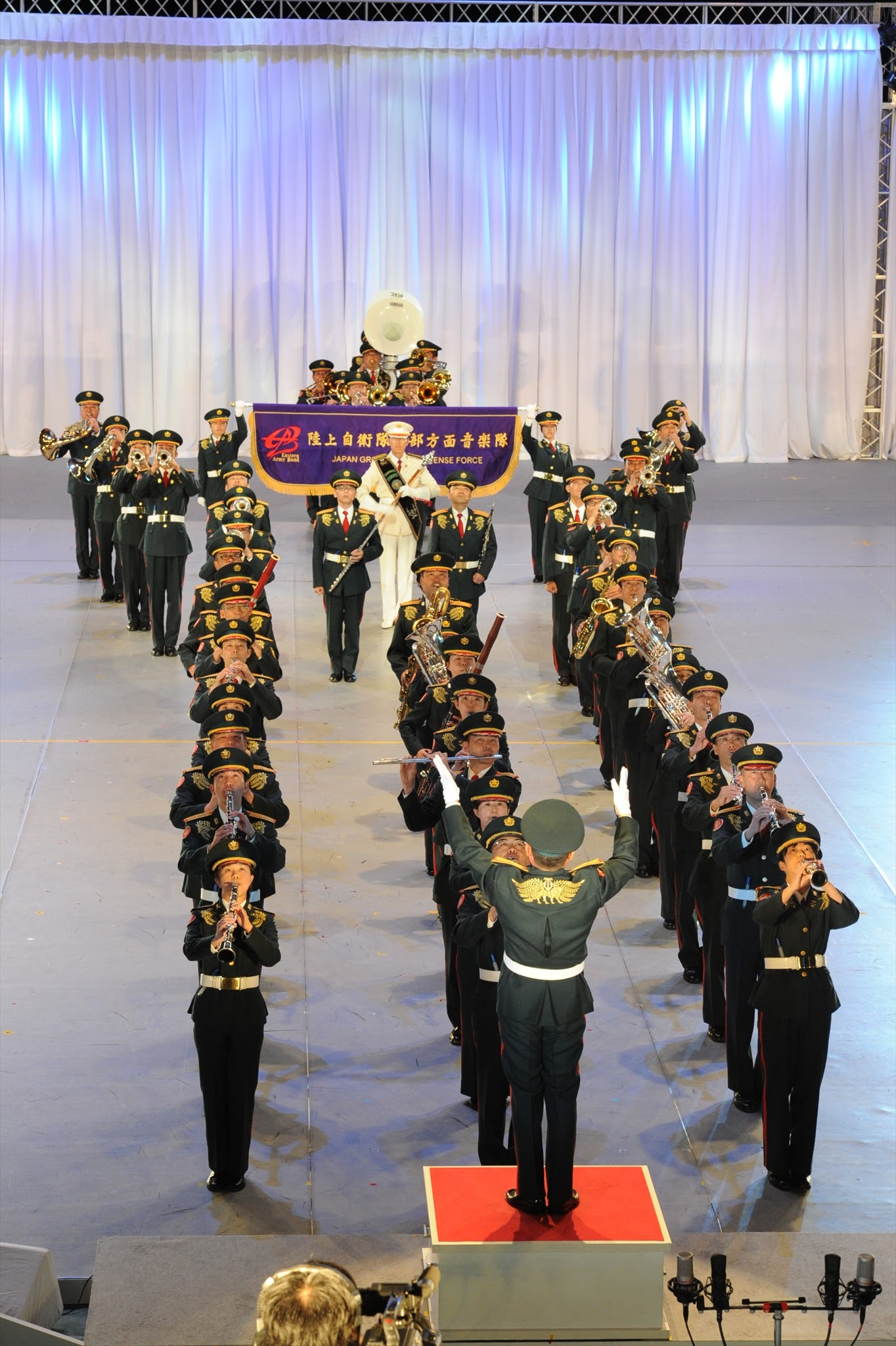
Eastern Army Band at JSDF Marching Festival 2012

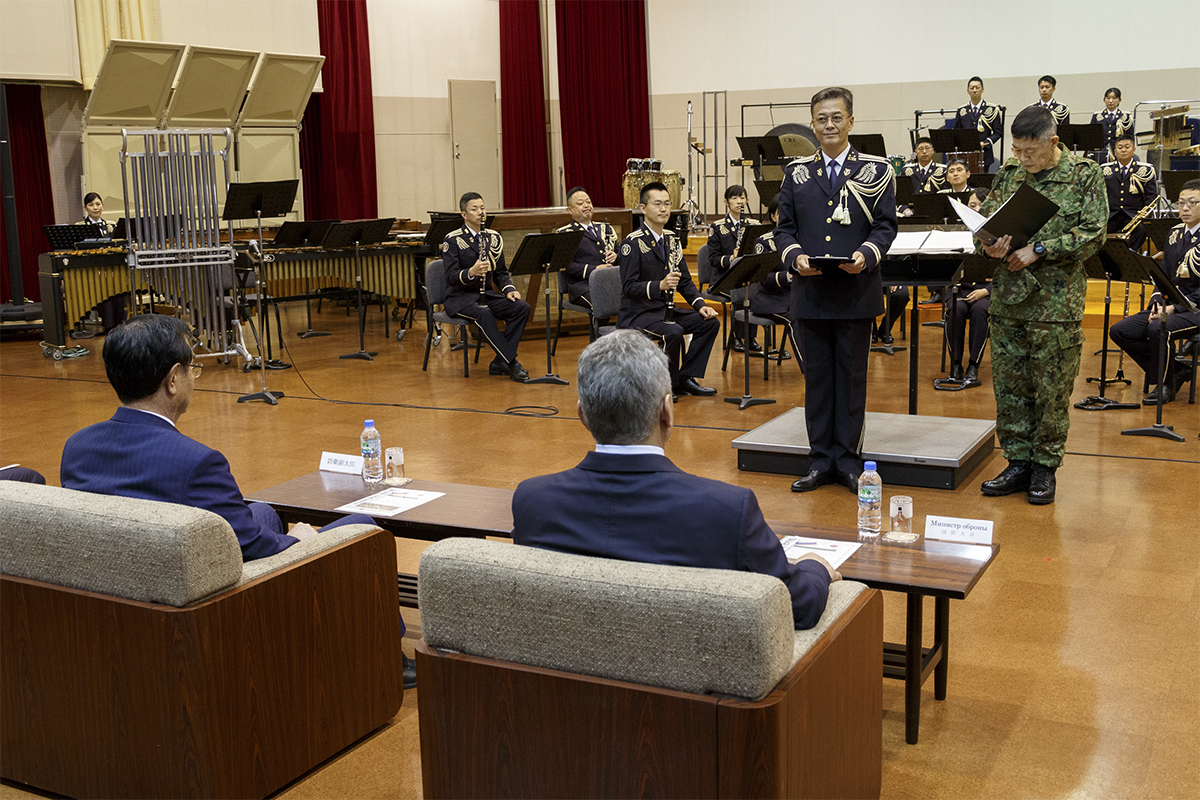
The Central Band inspected by Russian Defense Minister Sergey Shoigu and Japanese State Minister of Defense Kenji Harada

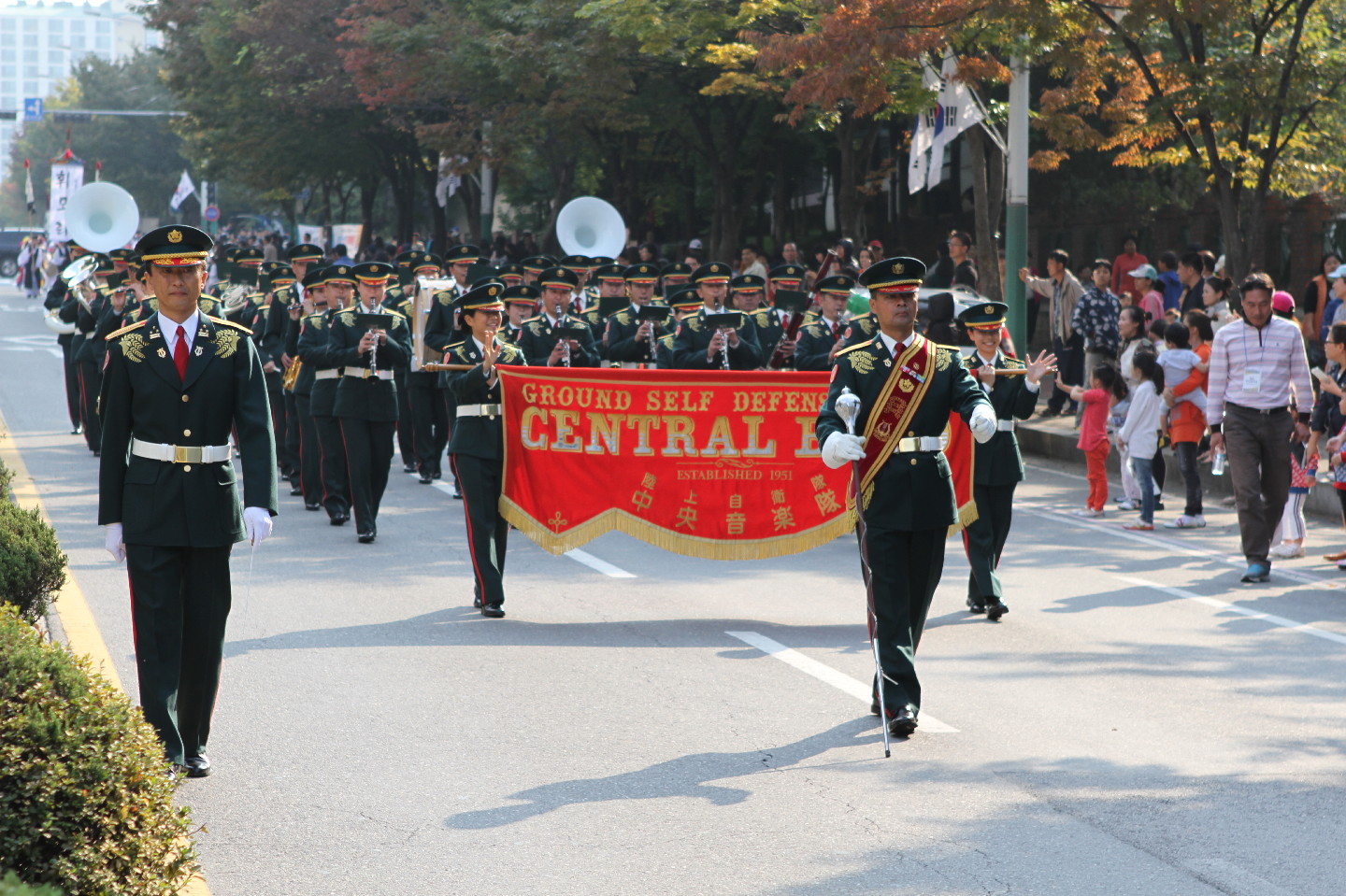
The Central Band in Korea in 2011

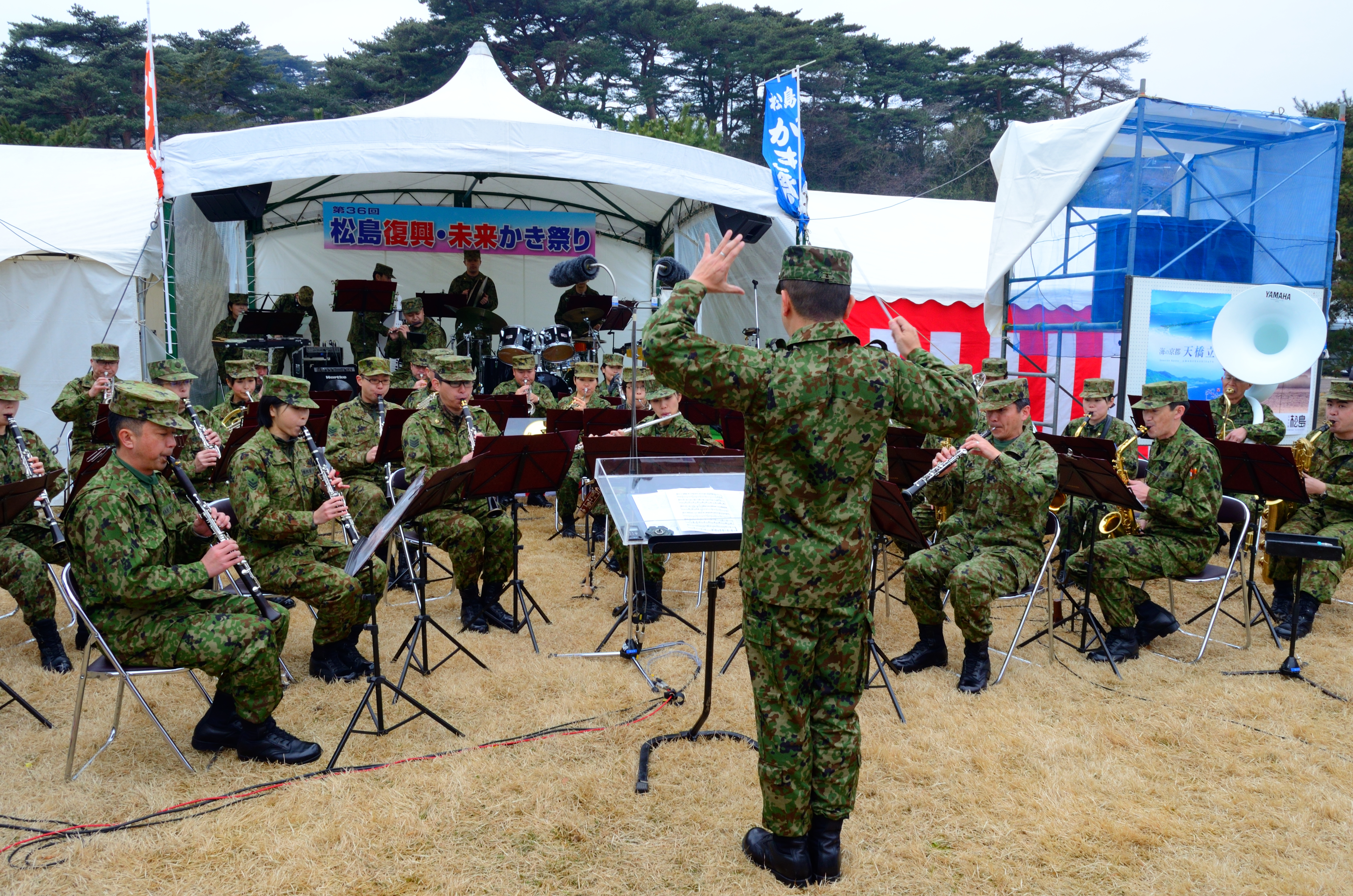
North Eastern Army Band in their camaflouge uniform at Matsushima

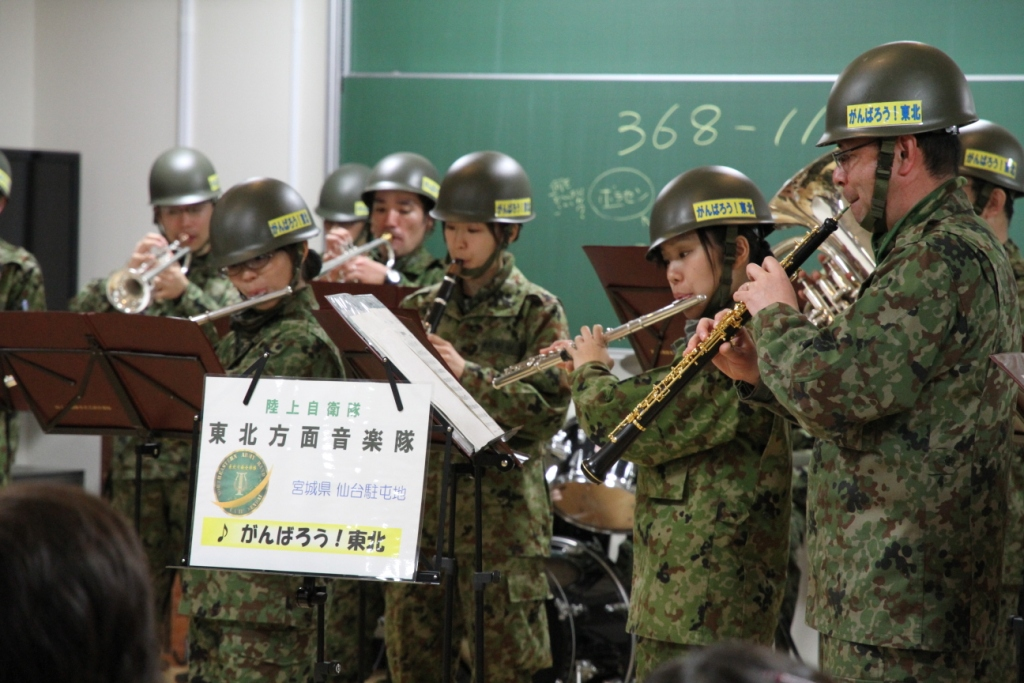
North Eastern Army Band playing for the 2011 Tōhoku earthquake and tsunami evacuees

== See also ==
- JSDF Marching Festival
