= Type 16 MCV =

Japanese wheeled armoured fighting vehicle

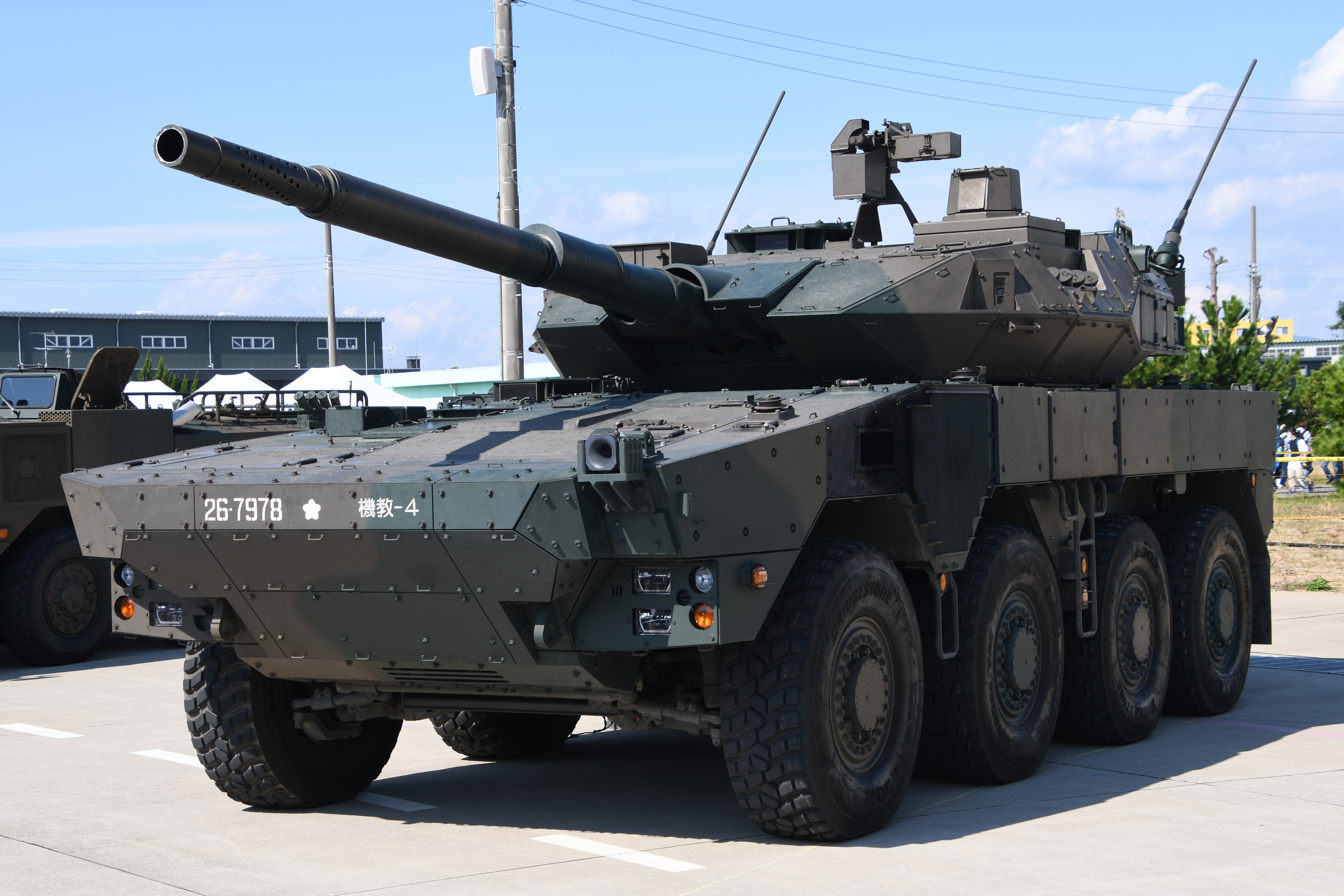
- The Type 16 on display at Hamamatsu Air Base
- Type: armored car assault gun tank destroyer
- Place of origin: Japan

Production history
- Designer: TRDI (Technical Research & Development Institute) (Note: Became the Acquisition, Technology & Logistics Agency in 2015.)
- Designed: 2007 onwards
- Manufacturer: Mitsubishi Heavy Industries
- Developed into: Common tactical wheeled vehicle
- Unit cost: 700 million yen (5.1 million USD)
- Produced: planned start in 2015
- No. built: 142 (as of FY2020)
- Variants: Mitsubishi Armored Vehicle

Specifications
- Mass: 26 tonnes
- Length: 8.45 m (27 ft 9 in)
- Width: 2.98 m (9 ft 9 in)
- Height: 2.87 m (9 ft 5 in)
- Crew: 4 (Note: some prototypes equipped with an autoloader had a crew of three)
- Main armament: 105 mm L/52 gun (developed by Japan Steel Works)
- Secondary armament: 12.7 mm (0.5 in) M2 Browning machine gun, 7.62 mm NATO coaxial Sumitomo Type 74 machine gun (replacing M2 Browning) Type 96 40 mm Automatic grenade launcher or FN Minimi 5.56 mm NATO light machine gun
- Engine: 4-cylinder water-cooled turbocharged diesel 11.3 litre 570 hp (430 kW)
- Power/weight: 21.9 hp/tonne
- Suspension: Wheeled 8 x 8
- Operational range: 400 km (250 mi)
- Maximum speed: 100 km/h (62 mph)

The Type 16 MCV (16式機動戦闘車, ichirokushiki kidousentousha; Type 16 Maneuver Combat Vehicle) is a wheeled armored fighting vehicle of the Japan Ground Self-Defense Force (JGSDF).

The Type 16 MCV equips designated combat units. Due to its light weight and small size, it is designed for easy deployment (by aircraft if needed) allowing rapid movement on narrow roads and in built-up areas in response to various contingencies. Despite its small size and light armor, it can successfully attack much larger armored fighting vehicles as well as personnel, using its large caliber gun.

== History ==
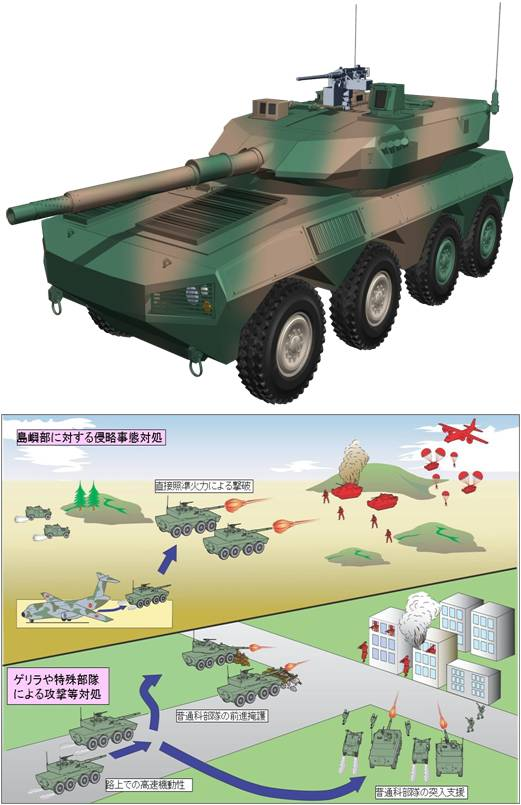
PR image from the TRDI / MOD illustrating MCV and possible use.

The first concept for a Japanese wheeled chassis mounting a 105 mm cannon appeared with the "Future Combat Vehicle" (将来装輪戦闘車両) program in 2003. The program was centered around a universal wheeled chassis mounting a variety of weaponry including a 40 mm CTA cannon, 120 mm mortar system, 155 mm howitzer, and a 105 mm cannon. The Future Combat Vehicle program was cancelled due to development expenses, but the concept for a 105 mm cannon would be expanded upon in the Light Combat Vehicle Program.

The LCV program was a technology demonstration to explore the viability of multiple concepts that would possibly be integrated into the maneuver combat vehicle development. These include IED and mine resistance, individual motors inside of the wheels, air transportability inside of a C-2 and Lockheed C-130 Hercules, passive hydro-pneumatic suspension to reduce recoil and a double action low recoil cannon that could provide indirect and direct fire. Initial designs for the LCV called for a 6x6 design, but that concept was scrapped in favor of an 8x8 design for the MCV. Other concepts that would be omitted from the Type 16 include the in-wheel engines, transport inside of the C-130, and indirect fire capability of the main cannon. The IED/ anti-tank mine resistance became an optional plate for the undercarriage that Type 16 crews can special order for their vehicle. After the concept was confirmed to be viable, work began on creating a new vehicle that would incorporate what was learned from the LCV project.

The Technical Research & Development Institute of Japan's Ministry of Defense had made several prototype vehicles since 2008. They unveiled their fourth of what were initially called "mobile combat vehicle" prototypes on 9 October 2013. JGSDF service Acceptance tests were scheduled to begin in 2014 or 2015, with initial operational deployment by the JGSDF planned for 2016. 99 MCVs were originally planned to be introduced by the end of FY 2018. The name of the vehicle was changed to maneuver combat vehicle during the second half of 2011.

For FY2016, the MOD has requested funding for 36 examples of the MCV, to enter service with elements of the 8th Division at Kumamoto, and the 14th Brigade at Zentsūji. Both formations are currently planned for conversion to rapid reaction forces (though these plans, as with the original plans for the MCV, were as of mid-2015 under review and subject to possible major revision. The intention is for the MCV to act as both as a rapid reaction asset against conventional incursions on the outer islands and as a counter-insurgency vehicle against asymmetrical attacks in urban areas of Japan by enemy special forces, intelligence operatives, or their proxies.

The MCV was part of a new armored vehicle strategy that prioritized light air-transportable firepower. Originally the number of main battle tanks was to be reduced from 760 to 390, with most remaining tanks to be concentrated on the main Japanese islands of Hokkaido and Kyushu. Some 200–300 MCVs were to be procured and these would be airlifted to islands when and where they were needed. The idea was that the smaller, lighter, and faster MCV could be redeployed quicker than tanks to better defend the outlying islands. This represented a shift in Japanese armored vehicle structure from one designed to repel a Soviet invasion from the north to a more mobile force aimed at possibly defending against a Chinese invasion of the southern island chain.

The MCV was intended to help re-equip existing divisions and brigades reorganised into mobile (rapid reaction) divisions/brigades, as well as equip new dedicated rapid reaction regiments alongside (eventually) the light-weight combat vehicle (LCV) which was also designed with defense of the outer islands in mind.

On March 15, 2023, ATLA announced that 250 MCVs will be brought into JGSDF service.

In April 2026, the Type 16 was deployed overseas during the Balikatan 2026 multinational exercises.

In May 2026, the Philippines is evaluating the Type 16 for a potential purchase in using fire support vehicles suitable for archipelagic defence.

== Design ==
MCVs are expected to be highly functional, but can also be loaded on Kawasaki C-2 transport aircraft. JMSDF is dedicated to securing transport vessels for maritime transport independently, and will be carried on these vessels and transported to the Okinawa Islands.

The main gun is manually loaded as a cost-saving measure. Some critics have expressed doubts about its effectiveness due to this strain on the crew in hot conditions, as the vehicle does not have air conditioning.

In 2009, resistance testing of the shielding against HEAT rounds was conducted using the Carl Gustav M2; and against regular kinetic ammunition the frontal shield was developed to resist shots from 20 mm to 30 mm autocannons while the side armor was deemed sufficient to resist 14.5 mm heavy machine gun fire.

== Variants ==
In June 2014, Mitsubishi Heavy Industries unveiled the MAV (Mitsubishi Armored Vehicle), an eight-wheeled armoured vehicle, at the Eurosatory defence and security trade show in France. The MAV incorporates technology from the Type 16 Maneuver Combat Vehicle and was developed independently by Mitsubishi, rather than under the direction of Japan's Ministry of Defence. A prototype has already been built and undergone internal testing. The Armoured Personnel Carrier (APC) variant of the MAV measures 8 metres in length, 2.98 metres in width, and 2.2 metres in height, with an unladen weight of 18 tonnes. These dimensions do not include additional protection such as slat armour or reactive armour. Its maximum combat weight is 28 tonnes. The model displayed at Eurosatory featured slat armour. For protection against landmines and improvised explosive devices (IEDs), the vehicle includes floating seats inside and can be fitted with V-shaped add-on armour underneath. It is designed to carry a crew of 11, including the commander and driver.

Various MAV variants are under consideration, including an armoured field ambulance and command and communications vehicle, both featuring a higher cabin roof than the APC version. A broader development programme known as the “Common Tactical Wheeled Vehicle” is also underway, aiming to standardise platforms based on the Type 16. A prototype of an infantry fighting vehicle fitted with a 30mm autocannon and a self-propelled 120mm mortar variant was sighted in September 2022. By spring 2023, a reconnaissance combat vehicle variant had also been seen, featuring the same 30mm cannon as the infantry fighting vehicle, along with a retractable surveillance sensor and a satellite communications dome.

On 31 August 2023, Japan's Ministry of Defence included budget allocations in its FY2024 request for the procurement of 24 infantry fighting vehicles and eight self-propelled mortar vehicles. As a result, three MAV-based variants are planned for procurement: the “Type 24 Wheeled Armored Fighting Vehicle” (infantry fighting vehicle), the “Type 24 Wheeled 120mm Mobile Mortar” (self-propelled mortar), and a reconnaissance combat variant of the Common Tactical Wheeled Vehicle, which, although unnamed as of now, is expected to follow a year behind the other two in deployment. Both vehicles debuted at the 2025 Fuji Firepower exercises with the Type 24 Reconnaissance and Surveillance Vehicle.

Following the cancellation of the “Improved Wheeled Armoured Vehicle” programme intended to replace the Type 96 Wheeled Armoured Personnel Carrier, the FY2019 budget allocated 2.1 billion yen for the acquisition and testing of candidate vehicles for Japan's next-generation wheeled armoured vehicle. On 10 September 2019, it was announced that trials would be conducted with three candidates: a prototype developed by Mitsubishi based on the Type 16, the Patria AMV from Finland, and the LAV 6.0 from General Dynamics Land Systems. Ultimately, on 9 December 2022, the Ministry of Defence selected the Patria AMV for adoption, and Mitsubishi's MAV-based proposal was not chosen.

== Operators ==
Japan

- Japan Ground Self-Defense Force
  - Northern Army
    - 11th Brigade
      - 10th Rapid Deployment Regiment
    - 5th Brigade (Japan)
      - 6th Rapid Deployment Regiment
    - 2nd Division
      - 3rd Rapid Deployment Regiment
  - North Eastern Army
    - 6th Division
      - 22nd Rapid Deployment Regiment
    - 9th Division
      - 9th Reconnaissance Combat Battalion
  - Eastern Army
    - 1st Division
      - 1st Reconnaissance Combat Battalion
    - 12th Brigade
      - 12nd Reconnaissance Combat Battalion
  - Central Army
    - 3rd Division
      - 3rd Reconnaissance Combat Battalion
    - 10th Division
      - 10th Reconnaissance Combat Battalion
    - 13th Brigade
      - 13th Reconnaissance Combat Battalion
    - 14th Brigade
      - 15th Rapid Deployment Regiment
  - Western Army
    - 4th Division
      - 4th Reconnaissance Combat Battalion
    - 8th Division
      - 42nd Rapid Deployment Regiment
  - JGSDF Fuji School
    - JGSDF Fuji School (Combined Training) Brigade
      - Armored (Advanced) School Regiment

== Orders ==
This is the list of orders with each fiscal year:

| Fiscal year | Budget (¥ billion) | Type 10 | Notes |
| 2027 | ¥ 0.00 | – | |
| 2026 | ¥ 0.00 | – | |
| 2025 | ¥ 15.6 | 15 | |
| 2024 | ¥ 17.1 | 19 | |
| 2023 | ¥ 21.3 | 24 | |
| 2022 | ¥ 23.7 | 33 | |
| 2021 | ¥ 15.8 | 22 | |
| 2020 | ¥ 23.7 | 33 | |
| 2019 | ¥ 16.1 | 22 | |
| 2018 | ¥ 13.7 | 18 | |
| 2017 | ¥ 23.3 | 33 | |
| 2016 | ¥ 25.2 | 36 | |
| Total | ¥ 195.5 | 255 | – |

Budget request
