= Type 03 Chū-SAM =

Type 03 Chu-SAM
- Type 03 Chu-SAM
- Type: mobile surface-to-air missile
- Place of origin: Japan

Service history
- In service: 2003 - Present
- Used by: Japan

Production history
- Designer: Mitsubishi Electric, Kato Works LTD.
- Manufacturer: Mitsubishi Heavy Industries

Specifications
- Mass: About 570kg
- Length: 4.9 m
- Diameter: About 0.32m
- Warhead: High-explosive
- Warhead weight: 73 kg
- Detonation mechanism: Proximity fuse
- Engine: Mitsubishi single-stage solid propellant rocket motor
- Operational range: 50 km or more
- Maximum speed: Mach 2.5
- Guidance system: Active AESA radar homing seeker plus inertial guidance and mid flight command link with track-via-missile

The Type 03 Medium-Range Surface-to-Air Missile (03式中距離地対空誘導弾, maru-san-shiki-chu-kyori-chi-tai-kuu-yuudou-dan) or SAM-4 or Chu-SAM (中SAM, Chū-Samu) is a Japanese developed surface-to-air missile system in service with the JGSDF. The SAM's vehicle chassis is based on the Kato Works Ltd/Mitsubishi Heavy Industries NK series heavy crane truck. It uses a state-of-the-art active electronically scanned array radar.

== History ==
The Technical Research and Development Institute (TRDI) developed the Type 03 in 1990 alongside Mitsubishi Electronics Corporation (MEC). The first prototypes were developed in 2001.

The Type 03 was operational in the JGSDF in 2003. According to the TRDI, they stated that the Type 03 is the successor of the Improved Hawk missiles. The missile was tested on November 20, 2006 at the MacGregor Range, White Sands Missile Range.

On November 25, 2025, the Type 03 was deployed in Yonaguni.

On November 30, 2025, talks were underway between Tokyo and Manila on potentially exporting the Type 03. On December 4, 2025, Tokyo has denied reports that the Type 03 were planned to be exported.

== Design ==
The Chu-SAM air defense system is based on 8×8 cross country unarmored trucks, and includes a command center, radar unit, launcher, and transloader, with each unit equipped with six missiles that travel at Mach 2.5. The system can track up to 100 targets simultaneously and target 12 at the same time, engaging fighter jets, helicopters, and cruise missiles.

=== Upgrade ===
==== Chu-SAM Kai ====
In 2014, the JGSDF began evaluation of the upgraded Chu-SAM Kai, which uses improved sensor and networking features for better range and targeting of more complex cruise and anti-surface missile threats. During the summer of 2015, 10 Chu-SAM Kai missiles were test fired at White Sands Missile Range in the United States and successfully intercepted various targets, including a GQM-163 Coyote supersonic target drone; White Sands hosted the launches because the location's large size and controlled airspace allowed for testing conditions unavailable in Japan. Operational tests of the Chu-SAM Kai took place at White Sands, in 2016.

All procurements are expected to be completed by the FY2032 budget.

==== Type 23 ship-to-air missile ====
The Chu-SAM Kai missile is also planned to be converted to the long-range ship-to-air missile with an ejectable rocket booster. It was successfully test fire onboard JS Asuka in December 2022. The new missile's main body is based on the technology of the Type 03 medium-range surface-to-air missile (modified), which is being deployed by the Japan Ground Self-Defense Force (JGSDF), and the booster is based on the technology of the Type 07 VL-ASROC in service with the JMSDF.

The ship-to-air missile, an upgraded version of the Chu-SAM Kai formerly known as the A-SAM, began procurement in FY2024 as the Type 23 ship-to-air missile.

==== Chu-SAM Kai (future version) ====
From FY2023 to FY2028, the Chu-SAM Kai will be upgraded to develop a new missile with enhanced intercept capability against short-range ballistic missiles and hypersonic glide vehicles.

== Deployment ==
- JGSDF Anti-aircraft Artillery (Advanced) Training Unit (高射教導隊, kousya-kyoudou-tai) since 2003
- JGSDF Eastern Army (Japan) 2nd Anti-aircraft Artillery Group (第2高射特科群, dai2-kousya-tokka-gun) at Camp Matsudo in Matsudo, Chiba since 2007
- JGSDF Central Army (Japan) 8th Anti-aircraft Artillery Group (第8高射特科群, dai8-kousya-tokka-gun) in Ono, Hyōgo since 2008

== Gallery ==
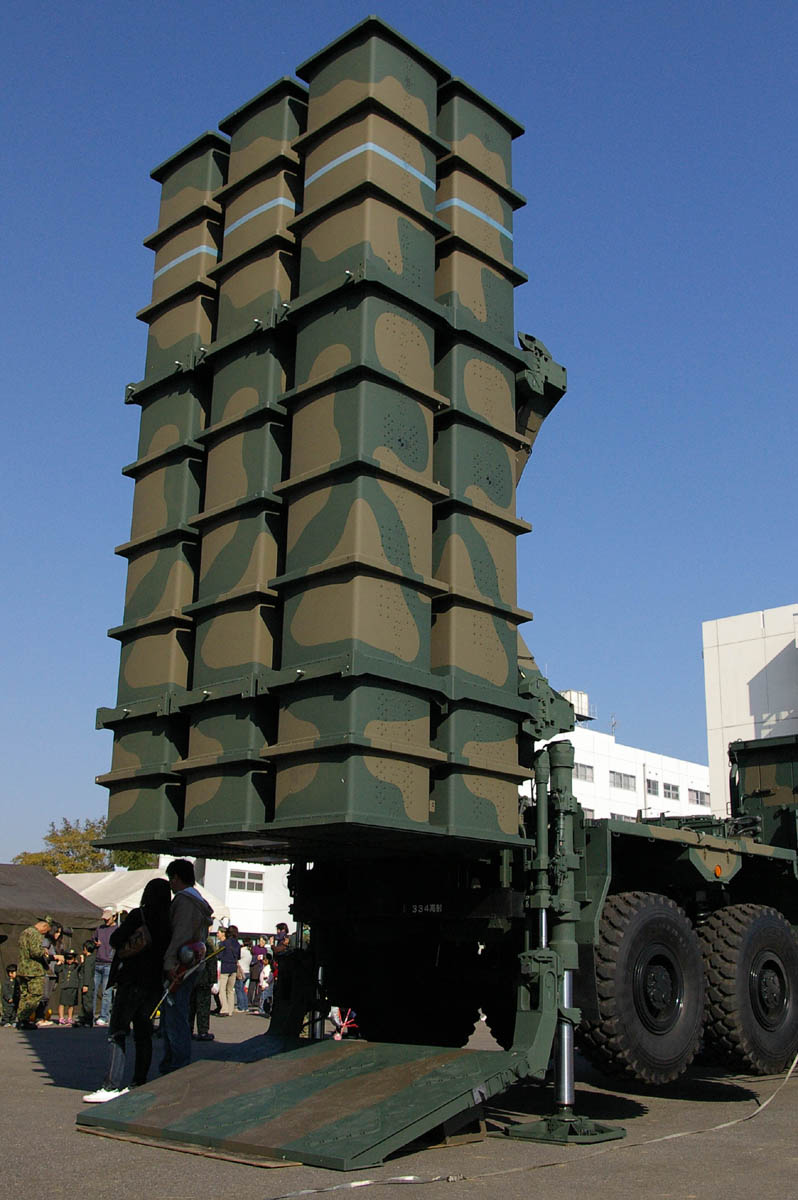
Fire position

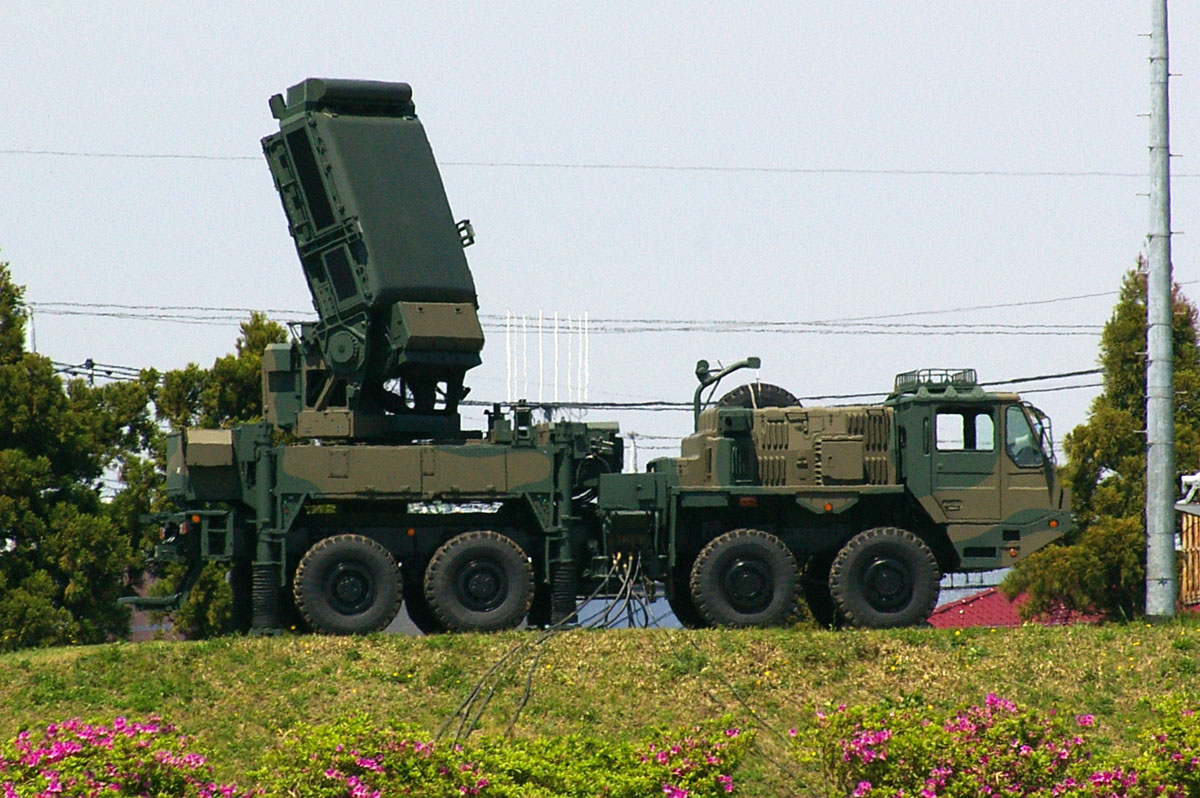
Radar vehicle with active electronically scanned array

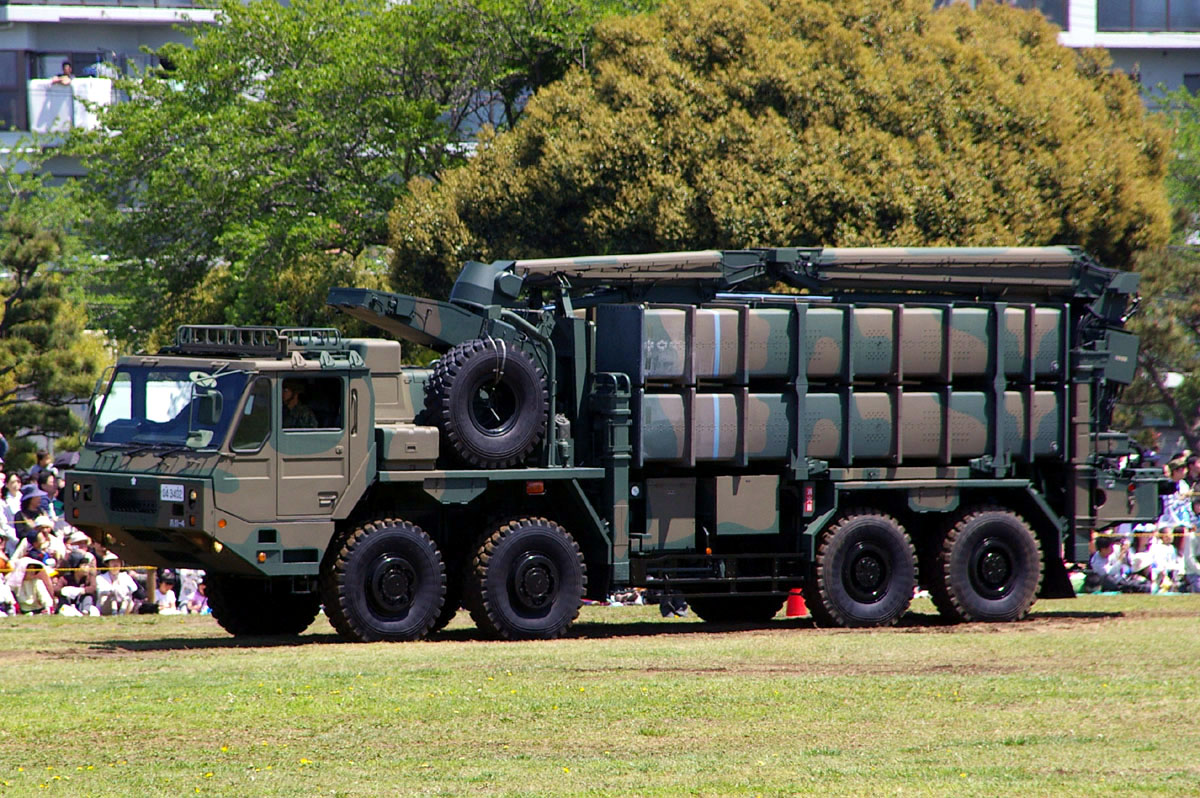
Ammo transporter

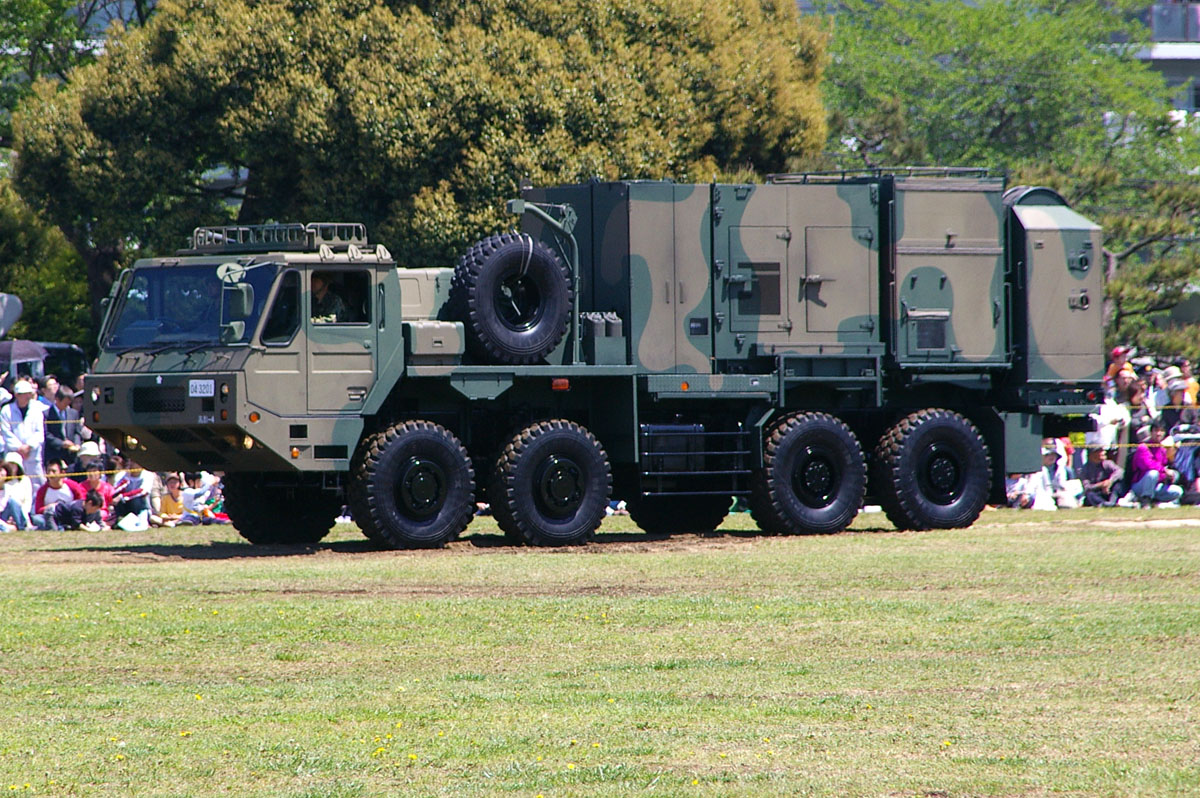
Power vehicle

== Orders ==
Fiscal year	Chū-SAM			Notes 1 battery = 4 fire units
Fiscal year	Type 03 Medium-range surface-to-air guided missile	Type 03 Medium-range surface-to-air guided missile (improved)	Type 03 Medium-range surface-to-air guided missile (improved) capability improvement	Notes 1 battery = 4 fire units
Fiscal year	# fire units (# batteries)	# fire units (# batteries)	# fire units (# batteries)	Notes 1 battery = 4 fire units
2026	–	4 (1)	–	
2025	–	8 (2)	–	
2024	–	2 (0.5)	–	
2023	–	4 (1)	–	
2022	–	4 (1)	–	
2021	–	4 (1)	–	
2020	–	4 (1)	–	
2019	–	4 (1)	–	
2018	–	4 (1)	–	
2017	–	4 (1)	–	
2016	4 (1)	–	–	
2015	4 (1)	–	–	
2014	4 (1)	–	–	
2013	0	–	–	
2012	8 (2)	–	–	
2011	4 (1)	–	–	
2010	4 (1)	–	–	
2009	8 (2)	–	–	
2008	4 (1)	–	–	
2007	4 (1)	–	–	
2006	4 (1)	–	–	
2005	8 (2)	–	–	
2004	1 (0.25)	–	–	
2003	2 (0.5)	–	–	
Total	59 (14.75)	38 (+ 4) (9.5 + (+ 1))	–	–
Total	97 (+ 4) (24.25 + (+ 1))			–

Budget request

== See also ==
- List of missiles
- Anti-ballistic missile

Comparable SAMs:

- MIM-104 Patriot – (United States)
- Akash (missile) – (India)
- S-300 – (Soviet Union, Russia)
- DK-10 – (China)
- HQ-16 – (China)
- NASAMS – (Norway, United States)
- KM-SAM – (South Korea)
- Sky Bow – (Taiwan)
