= Functional brigade =

A functional brigade —or functional support brigade— is a brigade of the United States Army.

It is specialized in combat support or combat service support for a particular military role. The primary purpose of a functional brigade is to conduct operational or theater level tasks or support by "plugging" into operational formations at the theater level or those commanded by corps or division commanders performing as the Army Service Component Command (ASCC) once deployed. Functional brigades, like modular support brigades, have a modular subordinate structure that may vary considerably among brigades of the same type. Unlike the modular support brigades, functional brigades typically operate under theater control and depend on theater-level elements for signal and other support. The theater force may task-organize them to corps or division headquarters. Types of functional brigades include:

- air defense
- chemical, biological, radiological and nuclear defense (CBRN)
- engineering
- explosive ordnance disposal (EOD)
- intelligence
- medical
- military police
- missile defense
- signal
