= 13th Brigade (Japan) =

- 13th Brigade Distinctive Unit Insignia
- Active: 29 March 1999 – present
- Country: Japan
- Branch: Japan Ground Self-Defense Force
- Type: Brigade
- Size: 3700
- Part of: Central Army
- Garrison/HQ: Kaita

Commanders
- Current commander: Maj. Gen. Hisakazu Kakegawa

The 13th Brigade (Japanese: 第13旅団) is one of eight active brigades of the Japan Ground Self-Defense Force. The brigade is subordinated to the Central Army and is headquartered in Kaita, Hiroshima. Its responsibility is the defense of the Chūgoku region.

The brigade was formed on 29 March 1999 with units from the disbanded 13th Infantry Division.

== Organization ==
- 13th Brigade, in Kaita
  - 13th Brigade HQ, in Kaita
  - 8th Infantry Regiment, in Yonago, with 1 × headquarters, 3 × infantry, and 1 × 120 mm mortar company
  - 17th Infantry Regiment, in Yamaguchi, with 1 × headquarters, 3 × infantry, and 1 × 120 mm mortar company
  - 46th Infantry Regiment, in Kaita, with 1 × headquarters, 3 × infantry, and 1 × 120 mm mortar company
  - 13th Reconnaissance Combat Battalion, in Izumo, with Type 16 maneuver combat vehicles, and Type 87 armored reconnaissance vehicles
  - 13th Anti-Aircraft Artillery Company, in Nagi
  - 13th Engineer Company (Combat), in Kaita
  - 13th Signal Company, in Kaita
  - 13th Aviation Squadron, in Hōfu, flying UH-1J and OH-6D helicopters
  - 13th NBC-defense Company, in Kaita
  - 13th Logistic Support Battalion, in Kaita
