= Central Army (Japan) =

- Central Army Distinctive Unit Insignia
- Active: 14 January 1960 – present
- Country: Japan
- Branch: Japan Ground Self-Defense Force
- Type: Field army
- Garrison/HQ: Camp Itami, Itami, Hyōgo
- Website: Official website

Commanders
- Current commander: Lt. Gen. Taizo Horii

The Central Army or Middle Army (中部方面隊, Chūbuhōmen-tai) is one of five active Armies of the Japan Ground Self-Defense Force. It is headquartered in Itami, Hyōgo. Its responsibility is the defense of Chūgoku, Kansai, Shikoku and the Southern half of the Chūbu region.

== Activities ==
The Central Army has participated in relief efforts within Japan such as the Kobe earthquake in 1995, the 2011 Tōhoku earthquake and tsunami and nuclear cleanup efforts following the Fukushima nuclear accident, and Tropical Storm Talas in 2011. They have also worked on international relief efforts, including reconstruction in Iraq in 2005, relief activities in Haiti in 2011, and peace cooperation activities 2014 in South Sudan.

== Organization ==
The Central Army is commanded by a lieutenant general, currently Makoto Endō (遠藤 充, Endō Makoto) (as of 1 November 2025. The forces under this command include the following:

- Central Army, in Itami
  - 3rd Division, in Itami, responsible for the defense of the Hyōgo, Kyōto, Nara, Ōsaka, Shiga and Wakayama prefectures.
    - 7th Infantry Regiment, in Fukuchiyama
    - 36th Infantry Regiment, in Itami
    - 37th Infantry Regiment, in Izumi
  - 10th Division, in Nagoya, responsible for the defense of the Aichi, Fukui, Gifu, Ishikawa, Mie and Toyama prefectures.
    - 14th Infantry Regiment, in Kanazawa
    - 33rd Infantry Regiment, in Tsu
    - 35th Infantry Regiment, in Nagoya
  - 13th Brigade, in Kaita, responsible for the defense of the Chūgoku region.
    - 8th Infantry Regiment, in Yonago
    - 17th Infantry Regiment, in Yamaguchi
    - 46th Infantry Regiment, in Kaita
  - 14th Brigade, in Zentsūji, responsible for the defense of Shikoku.
    - 15th Rapid Response Regiment, in Zentsūji
    - 50th Infantry Regiment, in Kōnan
  - Central Army Artillery Regiment, in Himeji
    - 1st Artillery Battalion, in Himeji
    - 2nd Artillery Battalion, in Toyokawa
    - 3rd Artillery Battalion, in Nagi
    - 4th Artillery Battalion, in Matsuyama
    - Target Acquisition Battery, in Himeji
  - Central Army Air Corps, in Yao
    - 112th Aviation Squadron, in Ise
    - Central Army Helicopter Battalion, in Yao
    - Central Army Air Traffic Control and Meteorological Company, in Yao
    - Central Army Airfield Maintenance Company, in Yao
  - Central Army Combined (Training) Brigade, in Ōtsu
    - 47th Infantry Regiment (Reserve), in Kaita
    - 49th Infantry Regiment (Reserve), in Toyokawa
    - 4th Non-Commissioned Officer Training Battalion, in Ōtsu
    - 109th Training Battalion, in Ōtsu
    - 110th Training Battalion, in Matsuyama
  - 4th Engineer Brigade, in Uji
    - 6th Engineer Group (Construction), in Toyokawa
    - 7th Engineer Group (Construction), in Uji
    - 102nd Equipment Battalion, in Uji
    - 304th Beach Obstacle Company, in Mihama
    - 304th Engineer Company, in Izumo
    - 305th Engineer Company, in Okayama
    - 307th Vehicle Company, in Uji
  - Central Army Signals Regiment, in Itami
    - 104th Command Post Signals Battalion, in Itami
    - 104th Base Systems Signals Battalion, in Itami
    - 303rd Central Signals Company, in Itami
  - Central Army Logistic Support, in Kyoto
    - 101st Supply Battalion (Reserve), in Kyoto
    - 104th Engineer Support Battalion (supports the 4th Engineer Brigade), in Uji
    - 107th General Support Battalion, in Kyoto
    - Central Army Transport Battalion, in Kyoto
    - 103rd Explosive Ordnance Disposal Company, in Kyoto
    - 302nd Anti-Aircraft Support Company (supports the 8th Anti-Aircraft Artillery Group), in Ono
    - 302nd Signals Support Company (supports the Central Army Signals Regiment), in Itami
    - 303rd Ammunition Company (Reserve), in Seika
    - 306th Infantry Support Company (supports the 49th Infantry Regiment), in Toyokawa
    - 307th Infantry Support Company (supports the 47th Infantry Regiment), in Kaita
    - 308th Artillery Support Company (supports the Central Army Artillery Regiment), in Himeji
  - 8th Anti-Aircraft Artillery Group, in Ono, with Type 3 Chū-SAMs
  - Central Army Intelligence Corps, in Itami
  - Central Army Medical Corps, in Itami
  - Central Army Command Post Training Support Company, in Itami
  - Central Army Accounting Company, in Itami
  - Central Army Band, in Itami

=== Central Army organization graphic ===
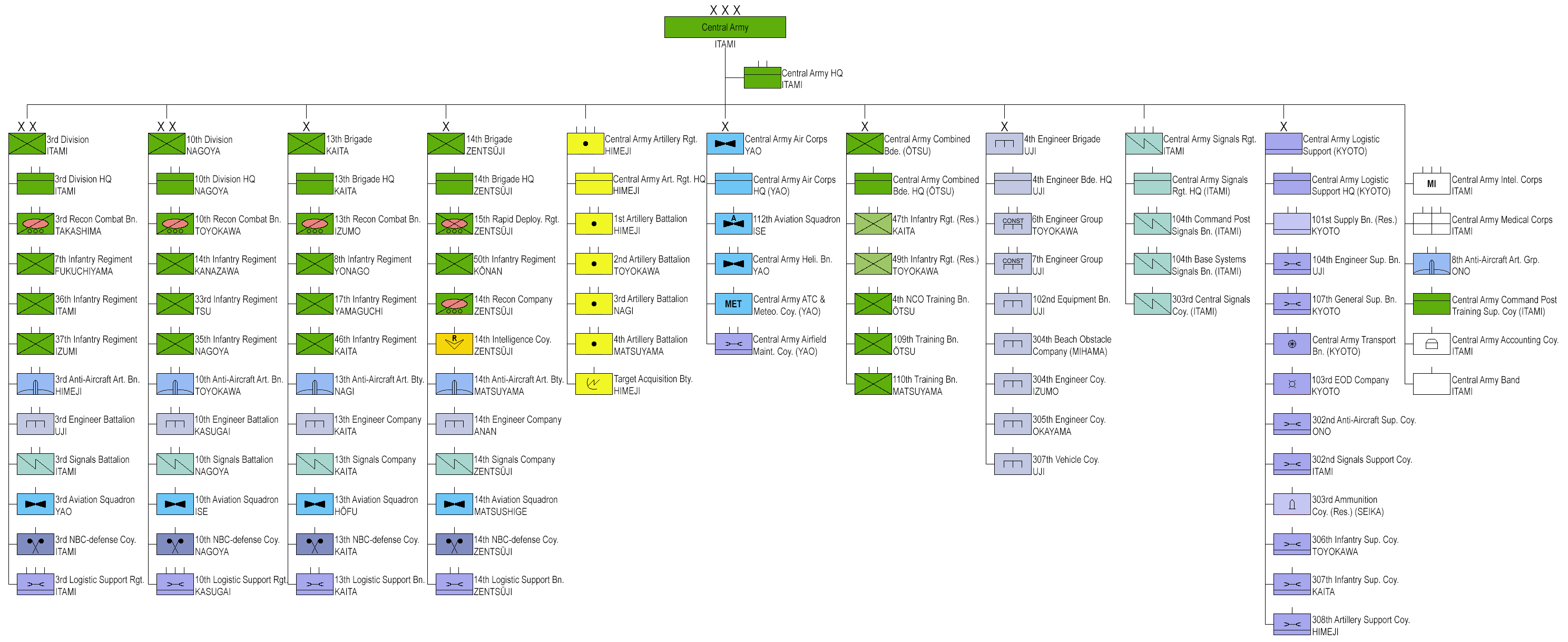
Central Army organization as of March 2026 (click image to enlarge)
