= 10th Division (Japan) =

- 10th Division Distinctive Unit Insignia
- Active: 18 January 1962 – present
- Country: Japan
- Branch: Japan Ground Self-Defense Force
- Type: Infantry division
- Size: about 9000 soldiers
- Part of: Central Army
- Garrison/HQ: Nagoya

Commanders
- Current commander: Lt. Gen. Tatuo Tarumi

The 10th Division (第10師団) is one of nine active divisions of the Japan Ground Self-Defense Force. The division is subordinated to the Central Army and is headquartered in Nagoya, Aichi. Its responsibility is the defense of the Aichi, Fukui, Gifu, Ishikawa, Mie and Toyama prefectures.

The division was raised on 18 January 1962.

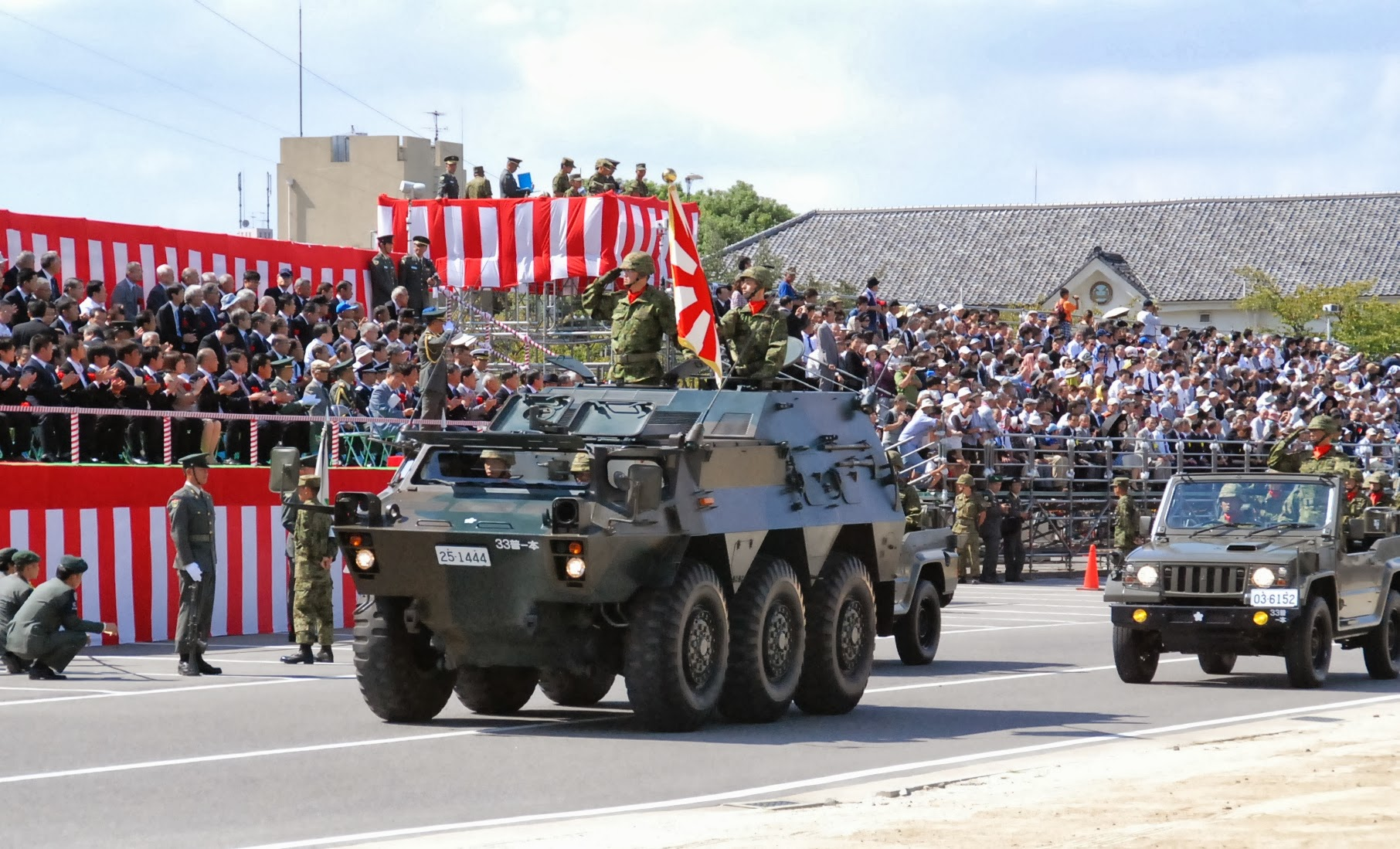
The march on the 51st anniversary commemoration event of the 10th Division (September 29, 2013 Moriyama garrison)

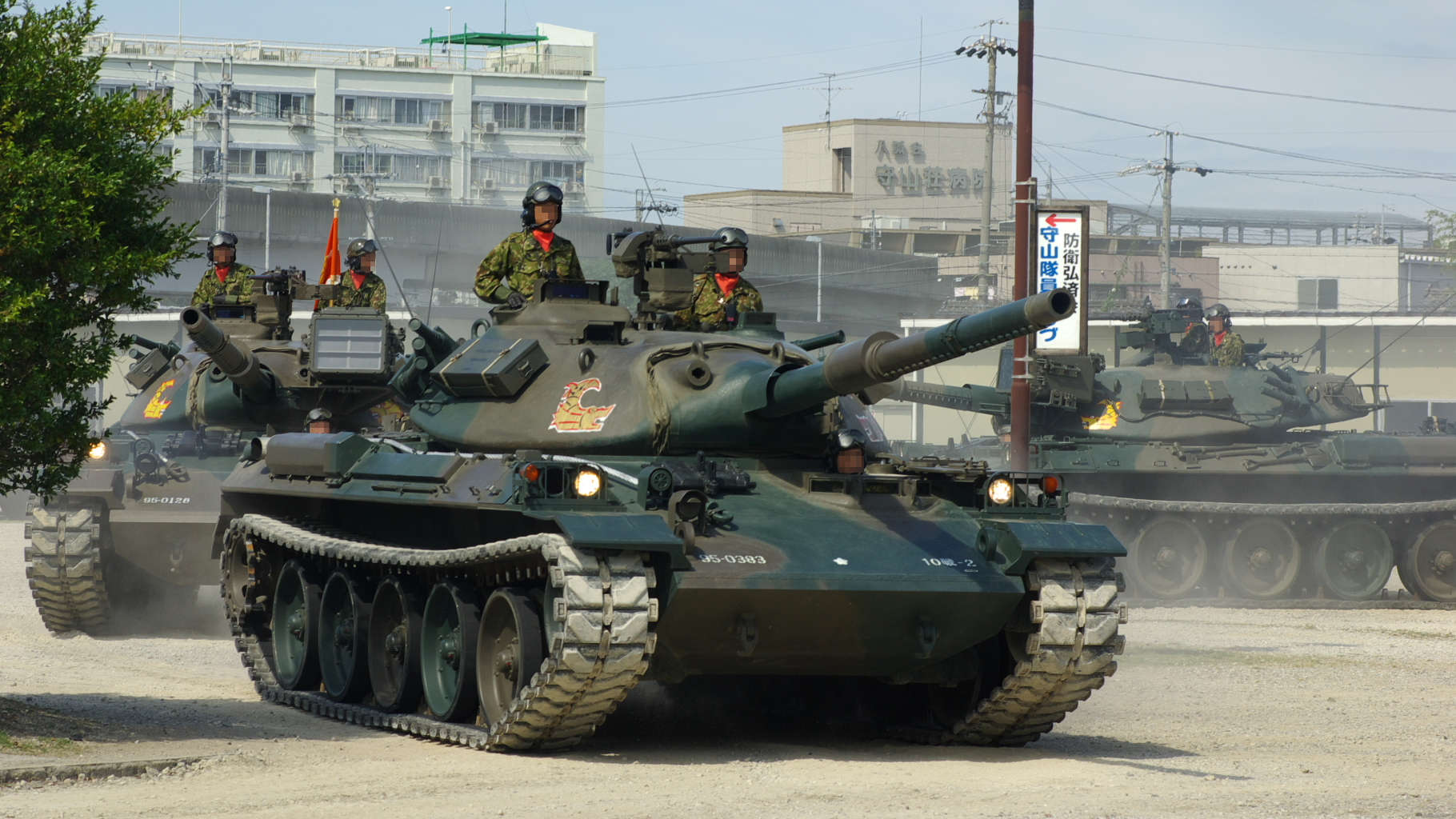
74 type tank belonging to the 10th Division, in October 2011, Moriyama garrison

== Organization ==
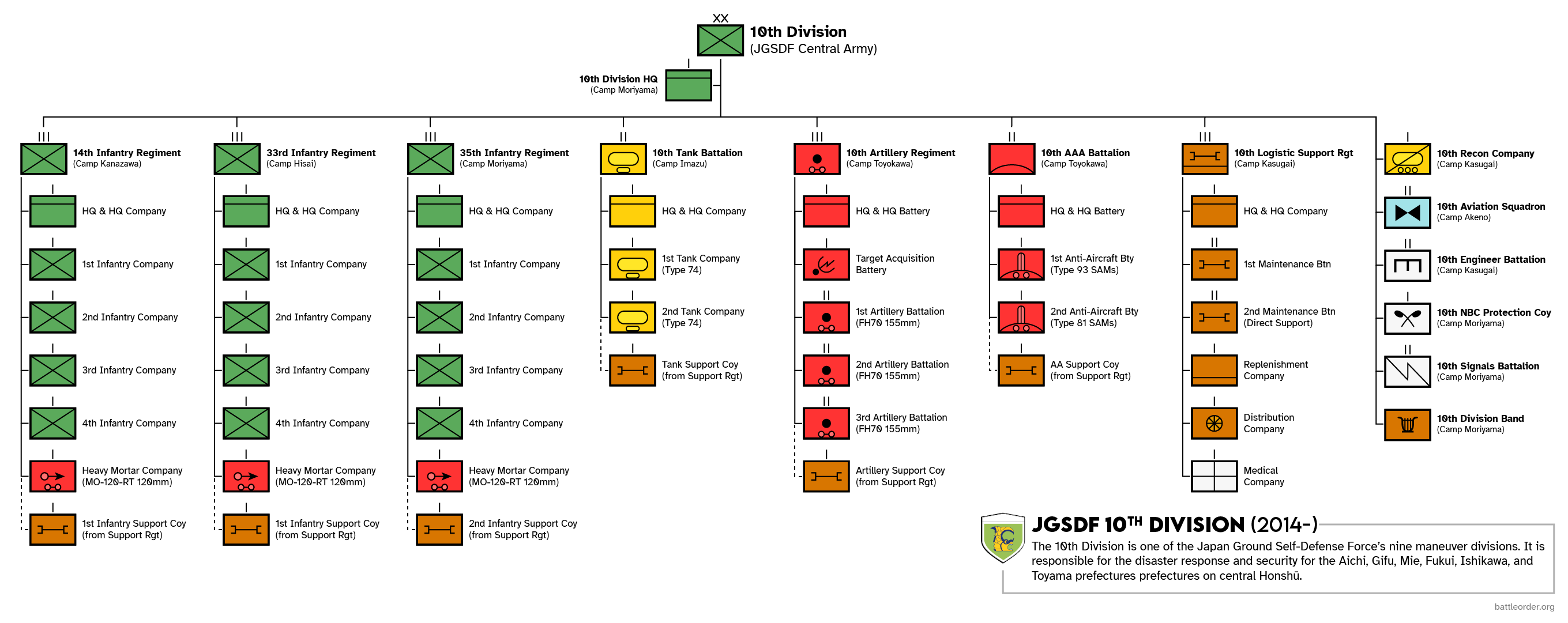
JGSDF 10th Division organization in 2022

- 10th Division, in Nagoya
  - 10th Division HQ, in Nagoya
  - 14th Infantry Regiment, in Kanazawa, with 1 × headquarters, 4 × infantry, and 1 × 120 mm mortar company
  - 33rd Infantry Regiment, in Tsu, with 1 × headquarters, 4 × infantry, and 1 × 120 mm mortar company
  - 35th Infantry Regiment, in Nagoya, with 1 × headquarters, 4 × infantry, and 1 × 120 mm mortar company
  - 10th Reconnaissance Combat Battalion, in Toyokawa, with Type 16 maneuver combat vehicles, and Type 87 armored reconnaissance vehicles
  - 10th Anti-Aircraft Artillery Battalion, in Toyokawa, with Type 81 and Type 93 surface-to-air missile systems
  - 10th Engineer Battalion (Combat), in Kasugai
  - 10th Signal Battalion, in Nagoya
  - 10th Aviation Squadron, in Ise, flying UH-1J and OH-6D helicopters
  - 10th NBC Protection Company, in Nagoya
  - 10th Logistic Support Regiment, in Kasugai
    - 1st Maintenance Battalion
    - 2nd Maintenance Battalion
    - Supply Company
    - Medical Company
    - Transport Company
