= Brigade =

Large military formation (3–6 battalions / 3,000–10,000 troops)

NATO Map Symbols

a friendly brigade
a hostile brigade
a friendly infantry brigade
a friendly combined-arms brigade
a hostile armored brigade
a hostile engineer brigade

A brigade is a major tactical military formation that typically comprises three to six battalions plus supporting elements. It is roughly equivalent to an enlarged or reinforced regiment. Two or more brigades may constitute a division.

Brigades formed into divisions are usually infantry or armored (sometimes referred to as combined arms brigades). In addition to combat units, they may include combat support units or sub-units, such as artillery and engineers, and logistic units. Historically, such brigades have been called brigade-groups. On operations, a brigade may comprise both organic elements and attached elements, including some temporarily attached for a specific task.

Brigades may also be specialized and comprise battalions of a single branch, for example cavalry, mechanized, armored, artillery, air defence, aviation, engineers, signals or logistic. Some brigades are classified as independent or separate and operate independently from the traditional division structure. The typical NATO standard brigade consists of approximately 5,000 troops. However, in Switzerland and Austria, the numbers could start as high as 10,000 troops. The Soviet Union as well as its forerunners and successors have mostly used "regiment" instead of brigade, and this was common in much of Europe until after World War II.

A brigade's commander is commonly a major general, brigadier general, brigadier or colonel. In some armies, the commander is rated as a general officer. The brigade commander has a self-contained headquarters and staff. The principal staff officer, usually a lieutenant colonel or colonel, may be designated chief of staff. Until the late 20th century British and similar armies called the position 'brigade-major' and most British brigades have a major as the chief of staff. Some brigades may also have a deputy commander. The headquarters has a nucleus of staff officers and support (clerks, assistants and drivers) that can vary in size depending on the type of brigade. On operations, additional specialist elements may be attached. The headquarters will usually have its own communications unit.

Example of typical modern US brigade formation

In some gendarmerie forces, brigades are the basic-level organizational unit.

== Origin ==
Borrowed from the French cognate word brigade, the term originates from the Italian noun brigata, itself derived from the Italian verb brigare, to contend or fight. The word is first attested in England in the 17th century as a term for a larger military unit than the squadron or regiment. It was first adopted when armies began to consist of formations larger than a single regiment. Previously each regiment, battalion, cavalry squadron, or artillery battery operated somewhat independently, with its own field officer (i.e., colonel, lieutenant colonel, or major) or battery commander (usually a captain) reporting directly to the field force or "army" commander. As such a "field army" became larger, the number of subordinate commanders became unmanageable for the officer in general command of said army, usually a major general, to effectively command. In order to streamline command relationships, as well as effect some modicum of tactical control, especially in regard to combined arms operations (i.e., those involving a coordination of infantry with cavalry and/or artillery forces), an intermediate level of command came into existence.

The Swedish king Gustavus Adolphus improved the brigade as a tactical unit, introducing it in 1631 during a reorganization of the Swedish Army in the course of the Thirty Years' War. The invention of the brigade overcame the lack of coordination inherent in the traditional army structure consisting of independent regiments of infantry and units of supporting arms (viz., cavalry and artillery) acting separately under their individual commanding officers. Gustavus Adolphus accomplished this battlefield coordination by combining battalions of infantry with cavalry troops and artillery batteries into a "battle group", viz., brigada or "brigade" commanded by a senior colonel, or lieutenant colonel, appointed as a brigadier-general.

In France, Marshal Turenne (1611–1675) copied the brigade organization; he made it a permanent standing unit, requiring the creation in 1667 of a permanent rank of brigadier des armées du roi (literally translating to "brigadier of the armies of the king"). Unlike the Swedish brigades, French brigades at that time comprised two to five regiments of the same branch (brigade de cavalerie, brigade d'infanterie etc.). The rank, intermediate between colonel and maréchal de camp, disappeared in 1788 and should not be confused with that of général de brigade, which is equivalent to a brigadier general. (A modern général de brigade is referred to occasionally as brigadier.)

== By country ==
=== Argentina ===
In the Argentine Army, the typical brigade comprises an HQ company, two or three battalions (called "regiments" for historical reasons) of the brigade's main branch (infantry or armoured cavalry), which give the brigade its denomination (mechanized, armoured, airborne, mountain or jungle), plus one battalion of the other branch, plus one or two artillery groups, an engineers battalion or company, a signals company, and intelligence company, an army aviation section and a logistics battalion. Mountain brigades have also a special forces (called "Mountain rangers") company. The brigade is usually commanded by a brigadier general or a senior colonel, who may be promoted to general during his tenure as brigade commander.

=== Australia ===
In the Australian Army, the brigade has always been the smallest tactical formation, since regiments are either administrative groupings of battalions (in the infantry) or battalion-sized units (in the cavalry). A typical brigade may consist of approximately 5,500 personnel between two mechanised infantry battalions, an armoured regiment, an armoured artillery regiment, and other logistic and engineering units. The brigade is usually commanded by an officer holding the rank of brigadier, who is referred to as the "Brigade Commander".

=== Canada ===
As of 2025, the Canadian Army has three Regular Force brigade groups, designated as Canadian mechanized brigade groups (CMBG): 1 CMBG, 2 CMBG, which contain the regular army's Anglophone units, and 5 CMBG, the regular Francophone formation. These CMBGs each comprise

- One headquarters and signal regiment
- Two mechanized infantry battalions
- One light infantry battalion
- One armoured regiment
- One mechanized artillery regiment
- One engineer regiment
- One combat service support (CSS) battalion.

Co-located with each CMBG is a field ambulance, a tactical helicopter squadron, and a military police platoon. Regular Force CMBG's strengths are 5,000 personnel. Canada also has ten Primary Reserve brigades (Canadian brigade group, CBG), 31 CBG through 39 CBG, and 41 CBG. The CBG formations are for administrative purposes.

=== France ===
On 1 January 1791, France replaced the word "Regiment" that had been associated with the former Royal regime with the term "demi-brigade".

France replaced its divisions with brigades in 1999 (so for example the 2nd Armored Division became the 2nd Armored Brigade). It was decided in 2016 to again form two divisions (1st and 3rd) made up of four and three brigades for a total of seven brigades: two armored, two "intermediate", two light brigades (alpine and parachute) and the Franco-German Brigade. There is also an airmobile brigade subordinated to the army aviation command.

In peacetime, brigades serve primarily as force providers. The units deployed (battlegroups and task-forces) are battalion-size units provided by the regiments composing the brigades.

=== India ===
In Indian Army, a brigade consists of a HQ, three battalions along with supporting troops. It is commanded by an army officer of the rank of Brigadier (single star commander). The Indian Army is also introducing combined arms formations like the Integrated Battle Group and the Rudra brigade.

=== Japan ===
Brigades in the Japan Ground Self-Defense Force (JGSDF) are combined arms and are similar to divisions. There are eight brigades in the JGSDF, with some of them formed from former divisions. A brigade in the JGSDF consists of 3,000–4,000 soldiers and is led by a major general.

- 1st Airborne Brigade, at Camp Narashino in Funabashi, Chiba Prefecture
- 5th Brigade, at Camp Obihiro in Obihiro, responsible for the defense of North Eastern Hokkaidō
- 11th Brigade, at Camp Makomanai in Sapporo, responsible for the defense of South Western Hokkaidō
- 12th Brigade (Air Assault), at Camp Soumagahara in Shintō, responsible for the defense of Gunma, Nagano, Niigata and Tochigi prefectures.
- 13th Brigade, in Kaita, responsible for the defense of the Chūgoku region.
- 14th Brigade, in Zentsūji, responsible for the defense of Shikoku.
- 15th Brigade, in Naha, responsible for the defense of Okinawa Prefecture
- Amphibious Rapid Deployment Brigade, at Camp Ainoura in Sasebo, Nagasaki; amphibious force equipped to deploy from ships, where needed.

=== Myanmar ===
In Myanmar, a rough equivalent of a Brigade is called a Tactical Operation Command. It's just a rough equivalent as a Tactical Operation Command has 3 Infantry Battalions under its command, there're no such Brigade troops or anything, instead those units such as Military Engineer, Signal, Medical etc. are supposed to be organic to the battalions (sometimes called Regiments). A Tactical Operation Command HQ only consist of 4 Officers and 4 Other Ranks. Theoritically, a Tactical Operation Command of either a Light Infantry Division or a Military Operation Command should have 97 Officers (4+31+31+31) and 2478 (4+826+826+826) Other Ranks but this as of recent events, is far from reality

Tactical Operation Command Headquarters: 4 Officers, 4 Other Ranks

Tactical Operation Commander: Colonel

Chief of Staff (rough equivalent of Brigade Major): Major (GSO II)

GS: Captain (GSO III)

AQ: Captain (GSO III)

Sergeant (Clerk) (4x)

GSO II and GSO III are called G2 and G3 in daily usages.

=== Norway ===
The main core of the Norwegian Army is the Brigade Nord, consisting of eight battalions of which four are combat battalions (one infantry, one mechanized infantry, one artillery and one armored) and the rest are various types of support battalions.

The brigade is intended to be combat ready at all times. The combat battalions have a significant portion of professional soldiers (specialists). The fairly large size of the combat ready support contingent is also intended to complement the Heimevernet (translates as "Home Defense") which is a large reserve infantry force, as well as act in a support capacity for an international cooperation force (e.g. NATO) in case of an invasion.

=== Pakistan ===
A brigade is under the command of a brigadier and comprises three or more battalions of different units depending on its functionality. An independent brigade would be one that primarily consists of an artillery unit, an infantry unit, an armour unit and logistics to support its actions. Such a brigade is not part of any division and is under direct command of a corps.

There are 7 independent armoured brigades, seven engineering brigades and eight air defense brigades. Independent armoured and infantry brigades are capable of extended operations without necessarily being reliant on a higher HQ for short-term logistic or intimate support. They can be used in counter-attack, exploitation of an advance, or rapid movement to reinforce formations under pressure.

=== People's Republic of China ===
Prior to major restructures of the People's Liberation Army Ground Force (PLAGF), forces were designed around the division as the basic operational unit in a similar fashion to Soviet divisions, from which much of the People's Liberation Army (PLA) is designed. In 2003, the United States Army pivoted from division-centric warfare to combined-arms-centric warfare in response to the U.S. War in Iraq creating the brigade combat team (BCT). The Russian Federation followed suit reorganizing their forces and doctrine to switch from division-centric warfare to the use of battalion tactical groups (BTGs). Finally, the PLAGF, as part of a larger restructuring, underwent the so-called "brigade-ization" making PLAGF divisions a largely administrative echelon and moving forces into combined arms brigades (CA-BDE).

Structured very similarly to U.S. Army BCTs, the PLAGF combined arms brigade places maneuver, artillery, air defense, reconnaissance, engineer and protection, and logistics and sustainment under a single brigade-level command. The PLAGF distinguishes three distinct types of combined arms brigades: light (motorized), medium (mechanized), and heavy (armoured). These distinctive types are more indicative of the role of the organization within its parent unit than the composition and equipment which vary and overlap between types. A light combined arms brigade may be designed as an airborne, mountain, or amphibious combined arms brigade.

A combined arms brigade typically comprises the following organic units wherein the maneuver battalions vary between motorized, mechanized, or armoured depending on the type of CA-BDE.

- 1 headquarters unit
- 4 maneuver battalions (CA-BNs)
- 1 reconnaissance battalion
- 1 artillery battalion
- 1 air defense battalion
- 1 operational support battalion
- 1 service support (sustainment) battalion

=== Republic of China ===
An NRA Brigade, 旅 (lǚ), was a military formation of the Chinese Republic's National Revolutionary Army. Infantry and cavalry brigades comprised two infantry regiments. After the 1938 reforms, the brigade was dispensed with within the infantry division in favour of the regiment to simplify the command structure.

=== United Kingdom ===
Brigades, with a field not a regional administrative role, have usually been of a named type and numbered since the 19th century (e.g. cavalry brigade or infantry brigade). Since the end of World War II, brigade numbers have been unique and not by type. Brigades in divisions do not usually command their combat support and combat service support units. These remain under divisional command, although they may be permanently affiliated with a particular brigade (as a "brigade group"). Historically, infantry or cavalry/armoured brigades have usually comprised three or four combat-arm battalions, but currently larger brigades are normal, made larger still when their affiliated artillery and engineer regiments are added.

Until 1918, the chief of staff of a brigade was known as a brigade major. Before 1922, British Army brigades were normally commanded by general officers holding the rank of brigadier-general (equivalent to a "one-star" rank in the US Army); after that date, the brigade commander was an appointment for officers with the rank of brigadier, which were then classified as field officers not general officers. This is universally the case today.

From 1859 to 1938, "brigade" ("brigade-division" 1885–1903) was also the term used for a battalion-sized unit of the Royal Artillery. This was because, unlike infantry battalions and cavalry regiments, which were organic, artillery units consisted of individually numbered batteries that were "brigaded" together. The commanding officer of such a brigade was a lieutenant colonel. In 1938, the Royal Artillery adopted the term "regiment" for this size of unit, and "brigade" became used in its normal sense, particularly for groups of anti-aircraft artillery regiments commanded by a brigadier.

In the Second World War, a tank brigade comprised three tank regiments and was equipped with infantry tanks for supporting the infantry divisions. Armoured brigades were equipped with cruiser tanks or (US Lend-Lease) medium tanks and a motorised infantry battalion. The armoured divisions included one or more armored brigades.

At the end of the 1960s, the 1st Infantry Division conducted division-wide trials using the "square brigade" concept. When they were deemed successful in 1970, all brigades within the BAOR were reorganised accordingly. Square brigades – 2×2 configuration of armour and infantry – were at this time envisaged as two armoured regiments and two mechanised infantry battalions. This differed from the previous infantry brigades, of three infantry battalions and one tank regiment, and armoured brigades of three armoured regiments and one infantry battalion.

=== United States ===
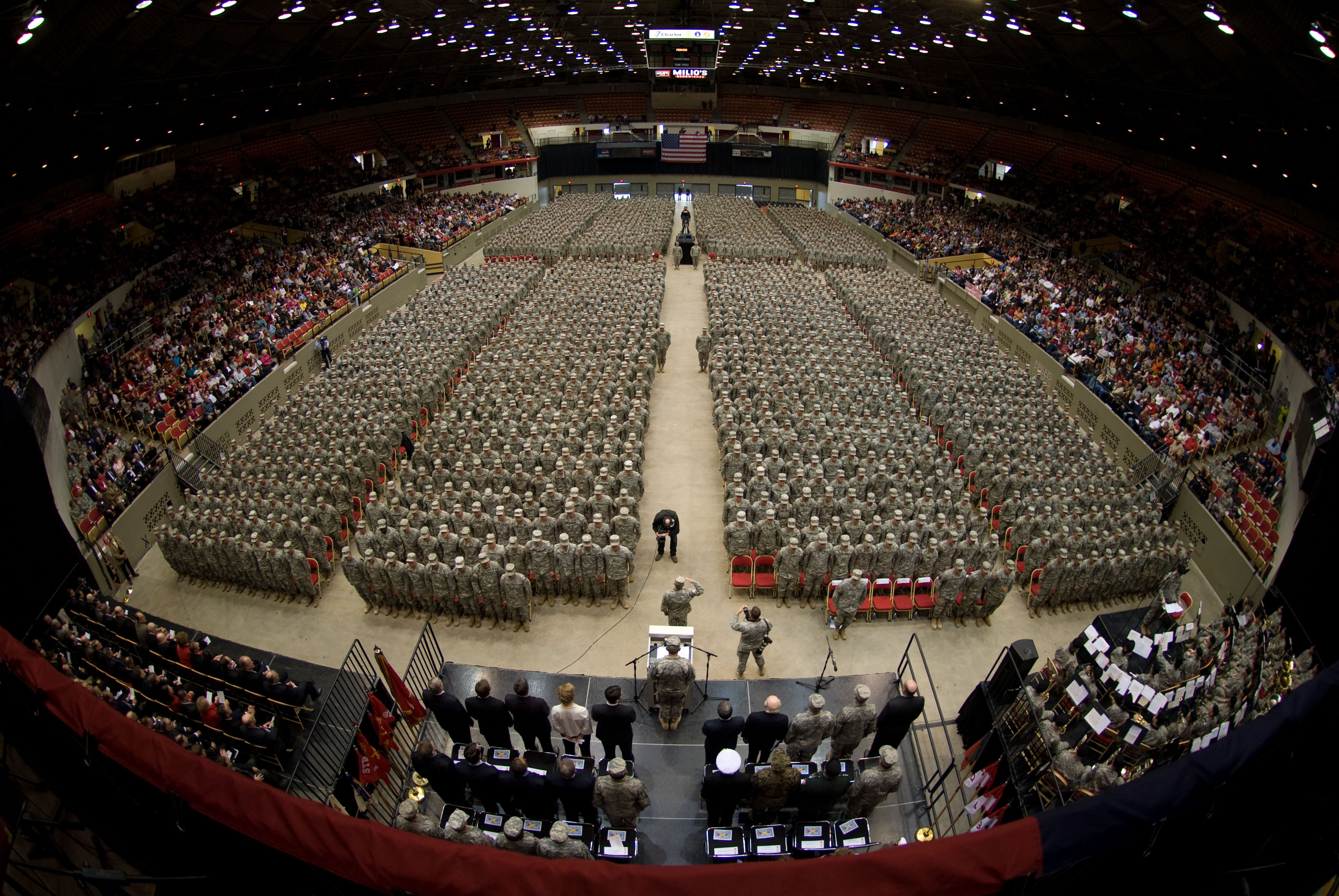
A U.S. infantry brigade of around 3,200 personnel, formed into eight battalion-sized groups

==== Army ====
In the modern United States Army, a brigade is smaller than a division and equivalent to a regiment, though regiments are now purely administrative organizational echelons that exist to preserve lineage, with brigades providing operational organization. During the American Civil War infantry brigades contained two to five regiments with the idea being to maintain a unit with a strength of 2,000 soldiers and were usually commanded by a brigadier general or a senior colonel.

More recently, the U.S. Army has moved to a new generic formation. This is a brigade combat team (BCT) in which each brigade contains combat elements and their support units. After the 2013 reform, BCT personnel strength typically ranges from 4,400 personnel for infantry brigade combat teams (IBCTs), to 4,500 personnel for Stryker brigade combat teams (SBCTs), to 4,700 personnel for armored brigade combat teams (ABCTs). The newest BCT is the mobile brigade combat team (MBCT). This formation is standard across three components: the active U.S. Army, U.S. Army Reserve, and the Army National Guard.

The brigade commander is usually a colonel, although a lieutenant colonel can be selected for brigade command in lieu of an available colonel. A typical tour of duty for this assignment is 24 to 36 months. Separate brigades, namely, brigades not permanently assigned to a division, were commanded by brigadier generals.

A brigade commander has a headquarters and staff to assist them in commanding the brigade and its subordinate units. The typical staff includes:

- a brigade executive officer, usually a major
- a brigade command sergeant major
- a personnel officer (S1), usually a major
- an intelligence officer (S2), usually a major
- an operations officer (S3), usually a major
- a logistics officer (S4), usually a major
- a plans officer (S5), usually a major
- a communications officer (S6), usually a major
- a medical officer, usually a major
- a legal officer from the Judge Advocate General's Corps, usually a major
- a brigade chaplain, usually a major

In addition, the headquarters includes additional junior staff officers, non-commissioned officers, and enlisted support personnel in the occupational specialities of the staff sections; these personnel are ordinarily assigned to the brigade's headquarters and headquarters company.

Functional brigades are those from the combat support or combat service support arms.

==== Marine Corps ====
In the United States Marine Corps, brigades are designated as marine expeditionary brigades (MEB) and are usually commanded by a brigadier general. The MEB is a mid-level marine air–ground task force (MAGTF) essentially forming a "demi-division". The MEB organizational structure consists of a minimum of three regimental-equivalent-sized units and a command element (a regimental combat team, a composite marine aircraft group, a marine logistics regiment, and a MEB headquarters group). Each marine expeditionary force (MEF) contains a MEB, available for deployment on expeditionary duty. The MEB is the intermediate MAGTF between the MEF and the marine expeditionary unit (MEU).

Along with the marine infantry regiments, the MEU, (while smaller than an army brigade), is the USMC organizational equivalents of army brigades. The MEU consists of three battalion-equivalent-sized units and a command element (a battalion landing team, a marine medium tilt-rotor squadron (reinforced), a combat logistics battalion, and a MEU headquarters group). The marine infantry regiments, combined with the marine artillery regiments, comprise the bulk of the marine divisions. An example of a MEB is Task Force Tarawa (2nd Marine Expeditionary Brigade) during the Operation Iraqi Freedom campaign.

== See also ==
- Artillery brigade
- Brigade de cuisine
- International Brigades
- Military organization
- Mixed brigade

== Bibliography ==
- (in French) Nouveau Larousse illustré, undated (early 20th century)
