= Asahikawa Air Field =

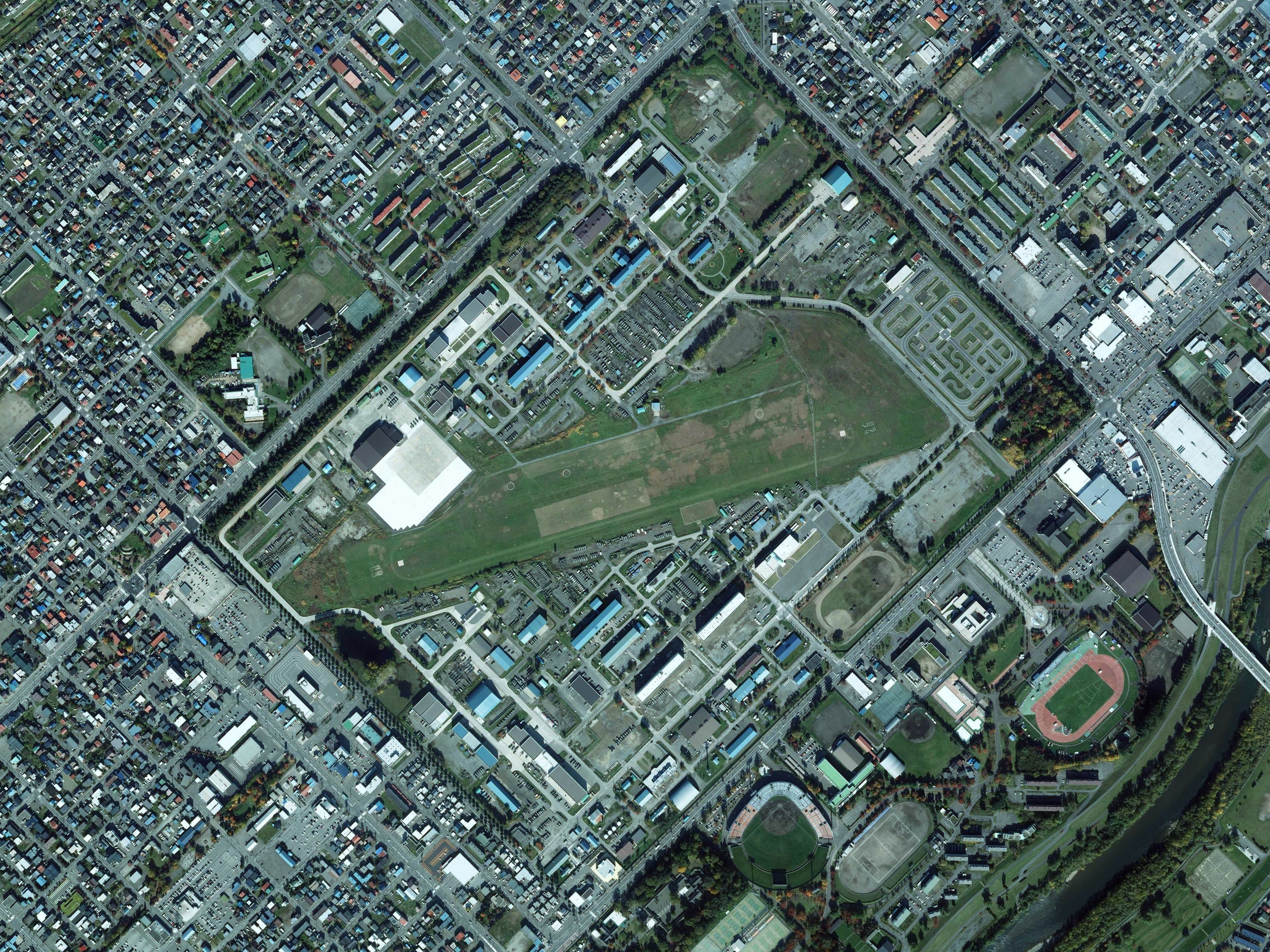
- IATA: none; ICAO: RJCA

Summary
- Airport type: Military
- Operator: Japan Ground Self-Defense Force
- Location: Asahikawa, Japan
- Elevation AMSL: 377 ft / 115 m
- Coordinates: 43°47′40″N 142°21′54″E

Map
- Location in Japan RJCA (Japan)

Runways
Direction	Length		Surface
Direction	m	ft	Surface
08/26	800	2,625	Sod
- Source: Japanese AIP at AIS Japan

Asahikawa Air Field (ICAO: RJCA) is a military aerodrome of the Japan Ground Self-Defense Force. It is located 1.8 NM (3.3 km; 2.1 mi) north of Asahikawa in Hokkaidō, Japan.
