= 12th Brigade (Japan) =

12th Brigade (Air Assault)
- 12th Brigade Distinctive Unit Insignia
- Active: 13 March 2001 – present
- Country: Japan
- Branch: Japan Ground Self-Defense Force
- Type: Air assault brigade
- Size: 4,000 soldiers
- Part of: Eastern Army
- Garrison/HQ: Shintō

Commanders
- Current commander: Maj. Gen. Masafumi Akamatsu

The 12th Brigade (Air Assault) (Japanese: 第12旅団) is one of eight active brigades of the Japan Ground Self-Defense Force. The brigade is subordinated to the Eastern Army and is headquartered in Shintō, Gunma. Its responsibility is the defense of Gunma, Nagano, Niigata and Tochigi prefectures.

The brigade was formed on 13 March 2001 with units from the disbanded 12th Infantry Division.

== Organization ==
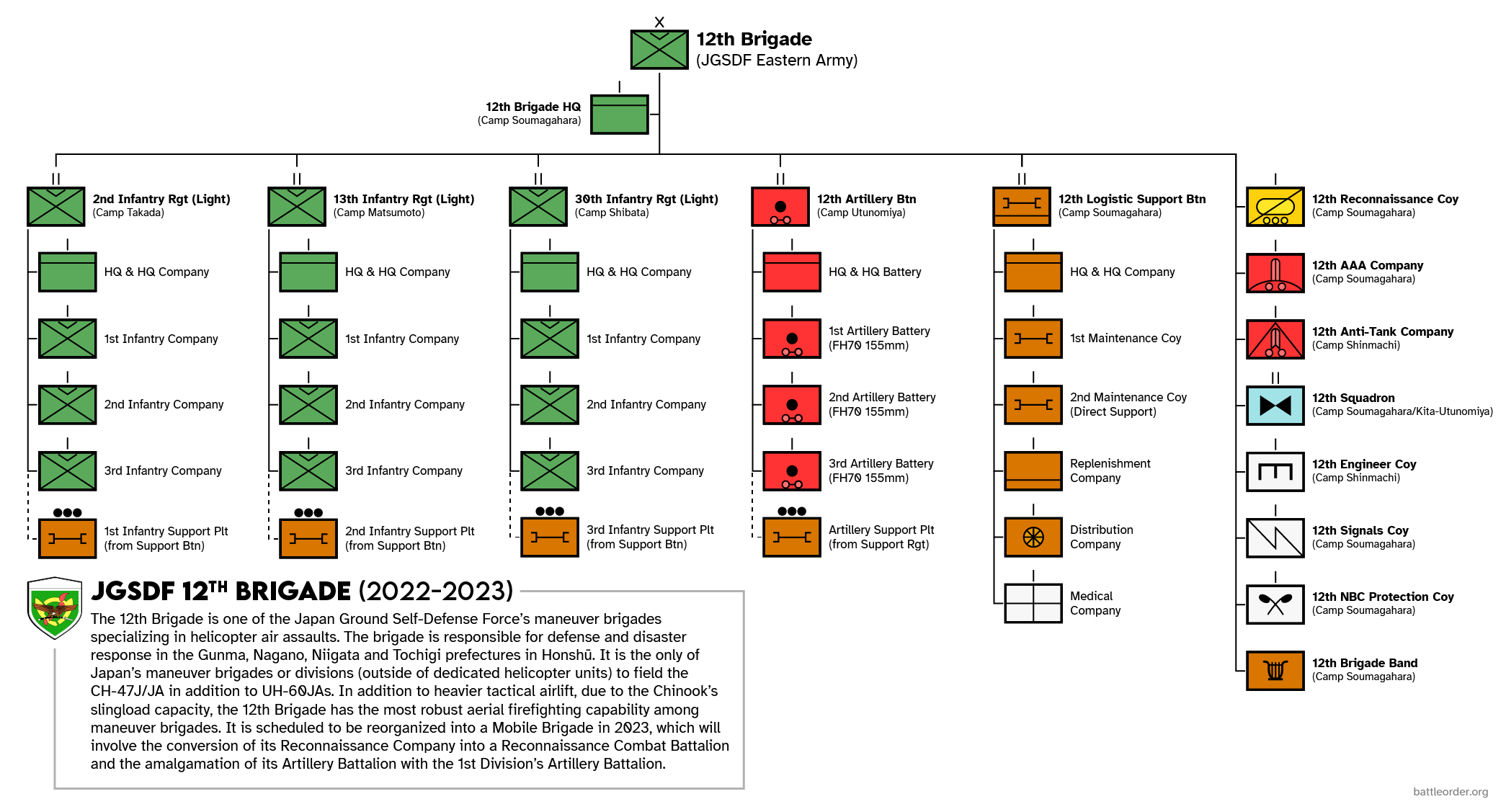
JGSDF 12th Brigade organization in 2022

- 12th Brigade, in Shintō
  - 12th Brigade HQ, in Shintō
  - 2nd Infantry Regiment ^{note 1}, in Jōetsu
  - 13th Infantry Regiment, in Matsumoto
  - 30th Infantry Regiment, in Shibata
  - 12th Reconnaissance Combat Battalion, in Shintō, with Type 16 maneuver combat vehicles, and Type 87 armored reconnaissance vehicles
  - 12th Anti-Aircraft Artillery Battery, in Shintō, with Type 81 and Type 93 Surface-to-air missile systems
  - 12th Engineer Company (Combat), in Takasaki
  - 12th Signal Company, in Shintō
  - 12th Aviation Squadron, in Shintō, flying UH-60JA and CH-47J/JA helicopters
  - 12th NBC-defense Company, in Shintō
  - 12th Logistic Support Battalion, in Takasaki

note 1: Infantry Regiments have only battalion strength.
