= 14th Brigade (Japan) =

- 14th Brigade Distinctive Unit Insignia
- Active: 27 March 2006 – present
- Country: Japan
- Branch: Japan Ground Self-Defense Force
- Type: Brigade
- Size: 2800
- Part of: Central Army
- Garrison/HQ: Zentsūji

Commanders
- Current commander: Maj. Gen. Tsuyoshi Ōba

The 14th Brigade (Japanese: 第14旅団) is one of eight active brigades of the Japan Ground Self-Defense Force. The brigade is subordinated to the Central Army and is headquartered in Zentsūji, Kagawa. Its responsibility is the defense of Shikoku.

The brigade was formed on 27 March 2006 with units from the disbanded 2nd Combined Brigade.

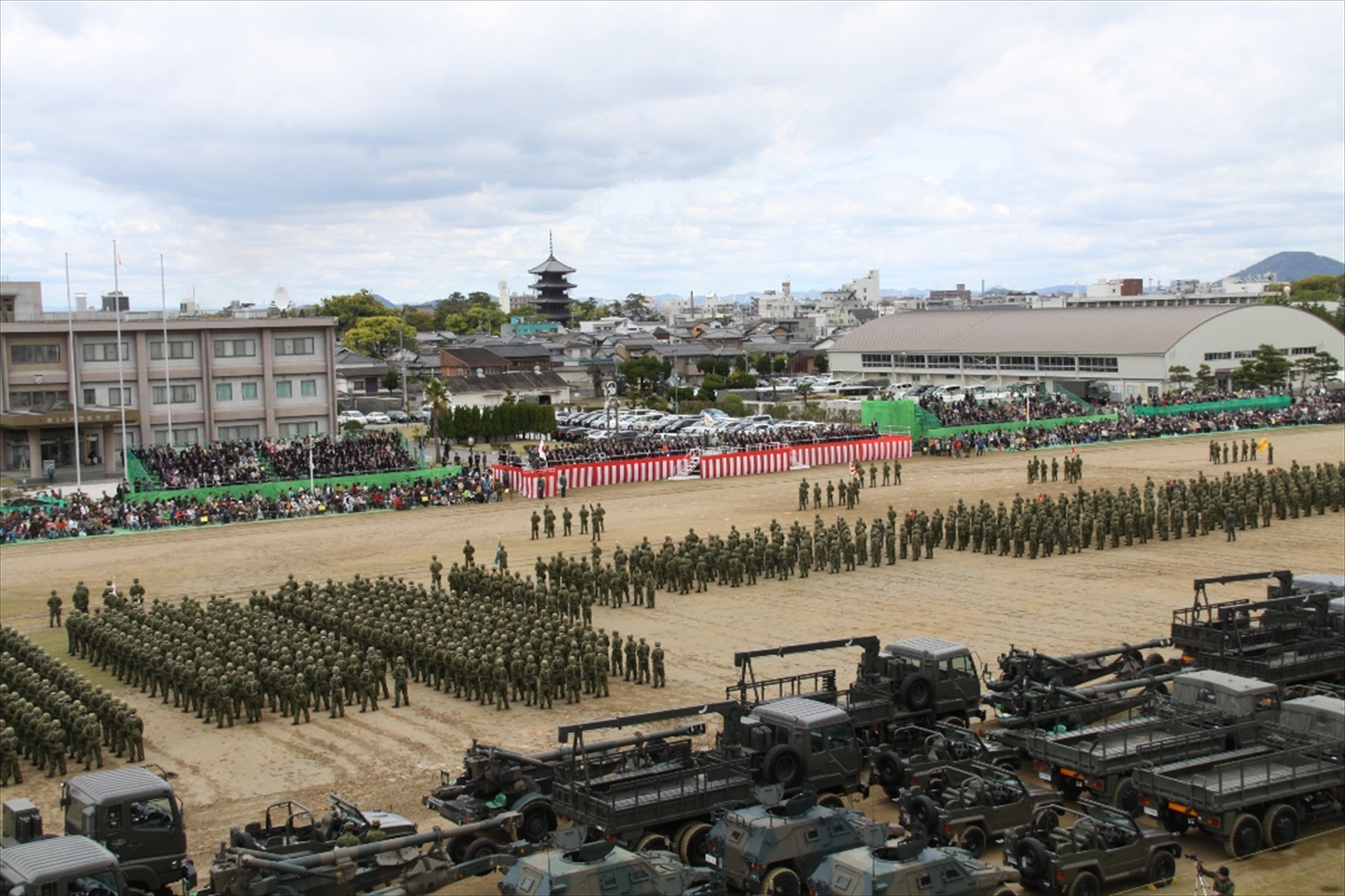
Subordinate troops in the brigade review ceremony

== Organization ==
- 14th Brigade, in Zentsūji
  - 14th Brigade HQ, in Zentsūji
  - 15th Rapid Deployment Regiment, in Zentsūji, with 1 × headquarters, 3 × Type 96 armored personnel carrier, 1 × 120 mm F1 mortar, and 1 × Type 16 maneuver combat vehicle company
  - 50th Infantry Regiment, in Kōnan, with 1 × headquarters, 3 × infantry, and 1 × 120 mm mortar company
  - 14th Reconnaissance Company, in Zentsūji, with Type 87 armored reconnaissance vehicle
  - 14th Intelligence Company, in Zentsūji, with ScanEagle
  - 14th Anti-Aircraft Artillery Company, in Matsuyama
  - 14th Engineer Company (Combat), in Anan
  - 14th Signal Company, in Zentsūji
  - 14th Aviation Squadron, in Matsushige, flying UH-1J and OH-6D helicopters
  - 14th NBC-defense Company, in Zentsūji
  - 14th Logistic Support Battalion, in Zentsūji
