= 3rd Division (Japan) =

- 3rd Division Distinctive Unit Insignia
- Active: 18 January 1962 – present
- Country: Japan
- Branch: Japan Ground Self-Defense Force
- Type: Infantry division
- Size: about 6400 soldiers
- Part of: Central Army
- Garrison/HQ: Itami

Commanders
- Current commander: Lt. Gen. Shigeru Kobayashi

The 3rd Division (第3師団) is one of nine active divisions of the Japan Ground Self-Defense Force. The division is subordinated to the Central Army and is headquartered in Itami, Hyōgo. Its responsibility is the defense of the Hyōgo, Kyōto, Nara, Ōsaka, Shiga and Wakayama prefectures.

The division was raised on 18 January 1962.

== Organization ==
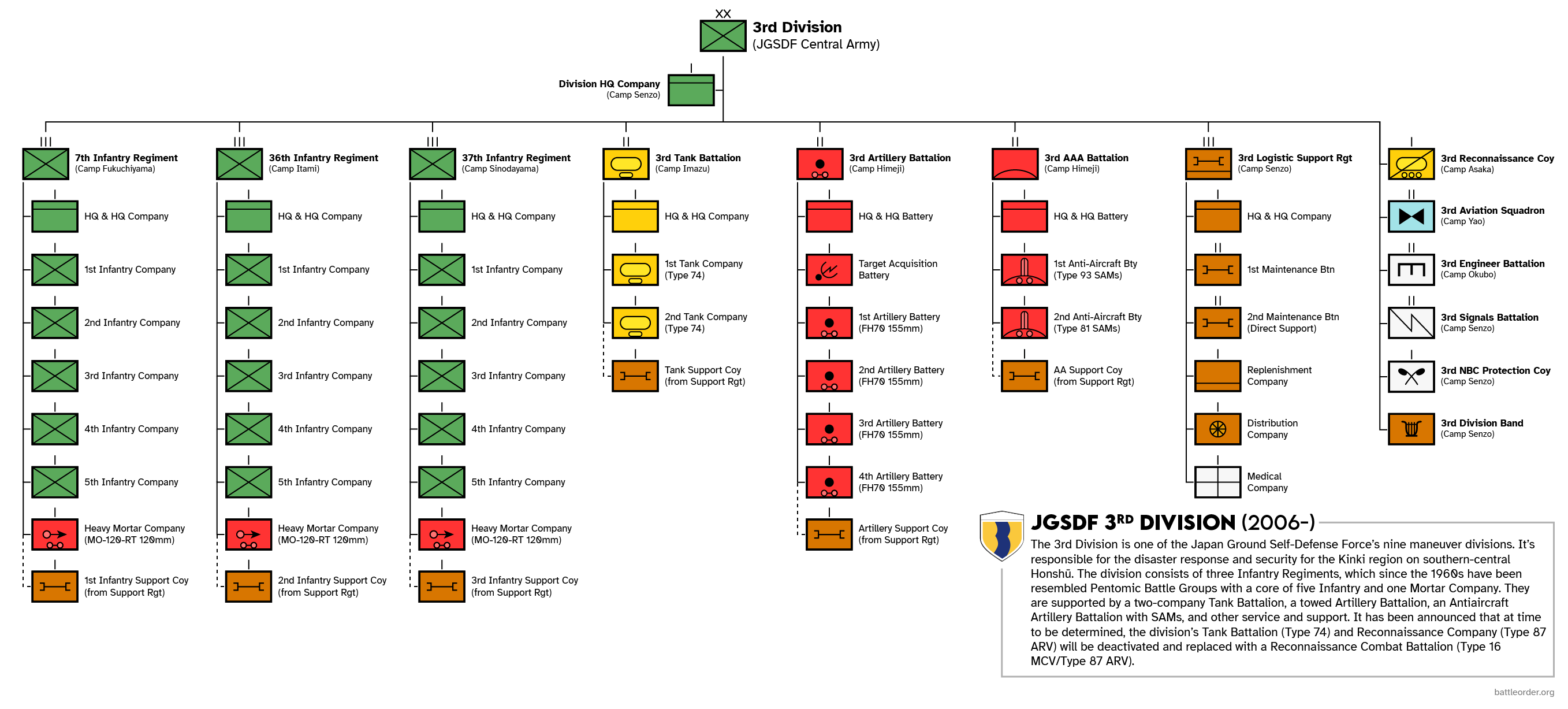
JGSDF 3rd Division organization in 2022

- 3rd Division, in Itami
  - 3rd Division HQ, in Itami
  - 7th Infantry Regiment, in Fukuchiyama, with 1 × headquarters, 5 × infantry, and 1 × 120 mm mortar company
  - 36th Infantry Regiment, in Itami, with 1 × headquarters, 5 × infantry, and 1 × 120 mm mortar company
  - 37th Infantry Regiment, in Izumi, with 1 × headquarters, 5 × infantry, and 1 × 120 mm mortar company
  - 3rd Reconnaissance Combat Battalion, in Takashima, with Type 16 maneuver combat vehicles, and Type 87 armored reconnaissance vehicles
  - 3rd Anti-Aircraft Artillery Battalion, in Himeji, with Type 81 and Type 93 Surface-to-air missile systems
  - 3rd Engineer Battalion (Combat), in Uji
  - 3rd Signal Battalion, in Itami
  - 3rd Aviation Squadron, at Yao Airport, flying UH-1J and OH-6D helicopters
  - 3rd NBC Protection Company, in Itami
  - 3rd Logistic Support Regiment, in Itami
    - 1st Maintenance Battalion
    - 2nd Maintenance Battalion
    - Supply Company
    - Medical Company
    - Transport Company
