= Camp Asaka =

Military base in Japan

- 朝霞駐屯地
- Oizumi-gakuen-cho; Nerima, Tokyo 178-8501; Near Tokyo in Japan
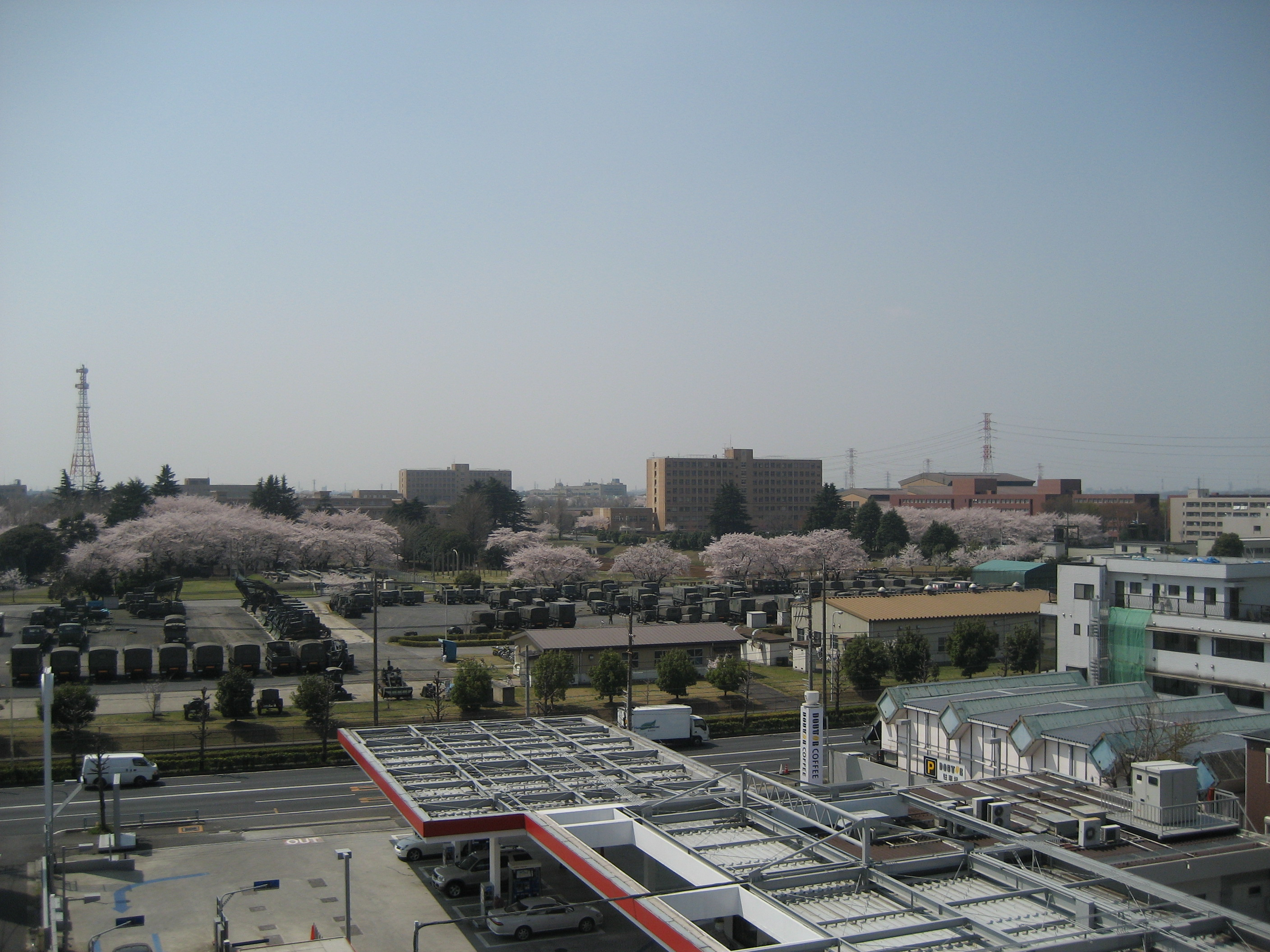

Site information
- Operator: Japan Ground Self-Defense Force

Location
- Coordinates: 35°46′53.06″N 139°35′47.13″E
- Area: 909,701 m2

Site history
- Built: 1941
- Built by: Imperial Japanese Army (as Junior Military Academy)

Garrison information
- Garrison: Eastern Army

Camp Asaka is a base of the Japan Ground Self-Defense Force. It lies in four municipalities: Nerima, Tokyo; Asaka, Saitama; Wako, Saitama; and Niiza, Saitama. It serves as the headquarters of the Eastern Army.

The camp was originally the site of a golf course from 1930 to 1940. It served as the site of the Imperial Japanese Army Junior Military Academy from 1941 to 1945, and as a United States Army camp (South Camp Drake) from 1945 to 1960, during which time it housed part of the 1st Cavalry Division.

The Asaka Shooting Range was a firing range constructed on the site for the 1964 Summer Olympics in Tokyo, and hosted pistol and rifle shooting and the shooting part of the modern pentathlon. It was the temporary shooting venue for the 2020 Summer Olympics.

== Organization ==
=== Ground Component Command ===
- Ground Component Command Headquarters
- Units Attached to Ground Forces Command Headquarters

=== Units Directly Subordinate to Ground Forces Command ===
- JGSDF C5 Command
  - Central Base Systems and Communications Unit
    - Systems and Network Operations Company (Partial)
      - Asaka Detachment
  - Central Field Communications Group (Partial)
    - 301st Command Post Communications Squadron
  - JGSDF 301st Image & Photograph Company (Partial)
    - Asaka Detachment
  - JGSDF Cyber Protection Unit (Partial)
    - 302nd System Defense Unit
- JGSDF Military Intelligence Command (Note: A 2020 Japanese Ministry of Defense document confirms the location of the Asaka Garrison.)
  - Headquarters and Units Attached to Headquarters
  - Intelligence Analysis Unit
  - Field Intelligence Unit
- Electronic Warfare Operations Unit
- Electronic Operations Unit Headquarters
- 101st Electronic Warfare Squadron

=== Eastern Army ===
- Eastern Army Command Headquarters
- Units Attached to Eastern Army Command Headquarters

=== Units Subordinate to the Eastern Army ===
- 1st Division (Japan)
  - JGSDF 1st Reconnaissance Combat Battalion
  - JGSDF 1st Engineer Battalion
  - JGSDF 1st Logistic Support Regiment
    - 1st Maintenance Battalion (Partial)
      - Engineer Maintenance Unit: Supports the 1st Engineer Battalion
    - 2nd Maintenance Battalion (Partial)
      - Reconnaissance and Combat Direct Support Unit: Supports the 1st Reconnaissance and Combat Battalion
- JGSDF Eastern Army Combined Brigade
  - JGSDF 31st Infantry Regiment
    - 2nd Infantry Company (deployed during training)
    - 3rd Infantry Company (deployed during training)
    - 5th Infantry Company (deployed during training)
    - JGSDF Women Training Unit
- JGSDF 2nd Antiaircraft Artillery Group (part)
  - 335th Air Defense Company
- JGSDF Eastern Army System Signal Group
- JGSDF Eastern Army Logistic Support Troop
- JGSDF Eastern Army Millitary Intelligence Unit
- JGSDF Eastern Army Medical Service Unit
- JGSDF Eastern Army Finance Service Unit
- JGSDF Eastern Army Command Post Training Support Unit
- JGSDF Eastern Army Band
- Asaka Garrison Administrative Unit

=== Units Directly Subordinate to the Minister of Defense ===
- JGSDF Military Police Unit (Partial)
  - JGSDF Eastern Army Military Police Headquarters
- JGSDF Finance Audit Unit (Partial)
  - Eastern Army Detachment
- JGSDF Central Transportation Command (Partial)
  - 3rd Army Detachment
    - Unit Headquarters
    - 1st Remote Area Administrative Section
- JGSDF Central Band

=== Agencies Directly Under the Minister of Defense ===
- JGSDF Logistics Support School
  - School Headquarters
  - Logistics Support Center
  - Transportation Division
  - JGSDF Logistics Support School training unit
    - 311th Transportation Squadron
  - Chief Instructor (Asaka)

=== Joint Units ===
- JSDF Intelligence Security Command (Partial)
  - Eastern Information Security Unit Headquarters

=== Joint Agencies ===
- JSDF Physical Training School (Joint agency of the Ground, Maritime, and Air Self-Defense Forces)

== Nearest Major Transportation Routes ==
- Expressways
  - Kan-Etsu Expressway: Nerima Interchange, Tokorozawa Interchange
  - Tokyo Gaikan Expressway: Wako Interchange
- General Roads: National Route 254 (Kawagoe Kaido), Saitama Prefectural Route 36 (Hoya-Shiki Line), Saitama Prefectural Road/Tokyo Metropolitan Road No. 40 (Saitama-Higashimurayama Line), Saitama Prefectural Road No. 108 (Tokyo-Asaka Line), Tokyo Metropolitan Road No. 311 (Ring Road No. 8), Tokyo Metropolitan Road No. 443 (Minami-Tanaka-cho–Asahi-cho Line)
- Railways: (Asaka Gate) Tobu Tojo Line, Tokyo Metro Yurakucho Line and Fukutoshin Line Wako-shi Station—about a 30-minute walk
- Bus Routes
  - Main Gate: From Seibu Ikebukuro Line Oizumi-Gakuen Station, take the Seibu Bus bound for Nagakubo or bound for Narimasu Station South Exit via Nagakubo; get off at the Nagakubo bus stop and walk 5 minutes
  - Asaka Gate: From Platform 3 at the South Exit of Wako-shi Station, take the Tobu Bus Route Wa-13 bound for the Self-Defense Forces Asaka Gate and get off at the Self-Defense Forces Asaka Gate bus stop (weekday mornings and evenings only; infrequent service)
- Ports
  - Port of Tokyo (Designated Specific Important Port)
- Airfields
  - Tokyo International Airport (Haneda Airport) (Class 1 Airport)
  - Chofu Airfield/Yokota Airfield/Iruma Air Base/Tachikawa Airfield (Other Airfields)
  - Tokyo Heliport (Public Heliport)
