= Eastern Army (Japan) =

- 東部方面隊
- Eastern Army Distinctive Unit Insignia
- Active: 14 January 1960 – present
- Country: Japan
- Branch: Japan Ground Self-Defense Force
- Type: Field army
- Garrison/HQ: Camp Asaka, Asaka, Saitama
- Engagements: Mishima incident

Commanders
- Current commander: Lt. Gen. Naotada Moriyama

The Eastern Army (東部方面隊, Tōbu Hōmentai) is one of five active Armies of the Japan Ground Self-Defense Force headquartered at Camp Asaka in Asaka, Saitama Prefecture. Its responsibility is the defense of the Kantō and the Northern half of the Chūbu region.

== History ==
The Eastern Army was formed on 14 January 1960.

The Eastern Army was involved in thwarting an attempted coup by Yukio Mishima and the Tatenokai.

== Organization ==
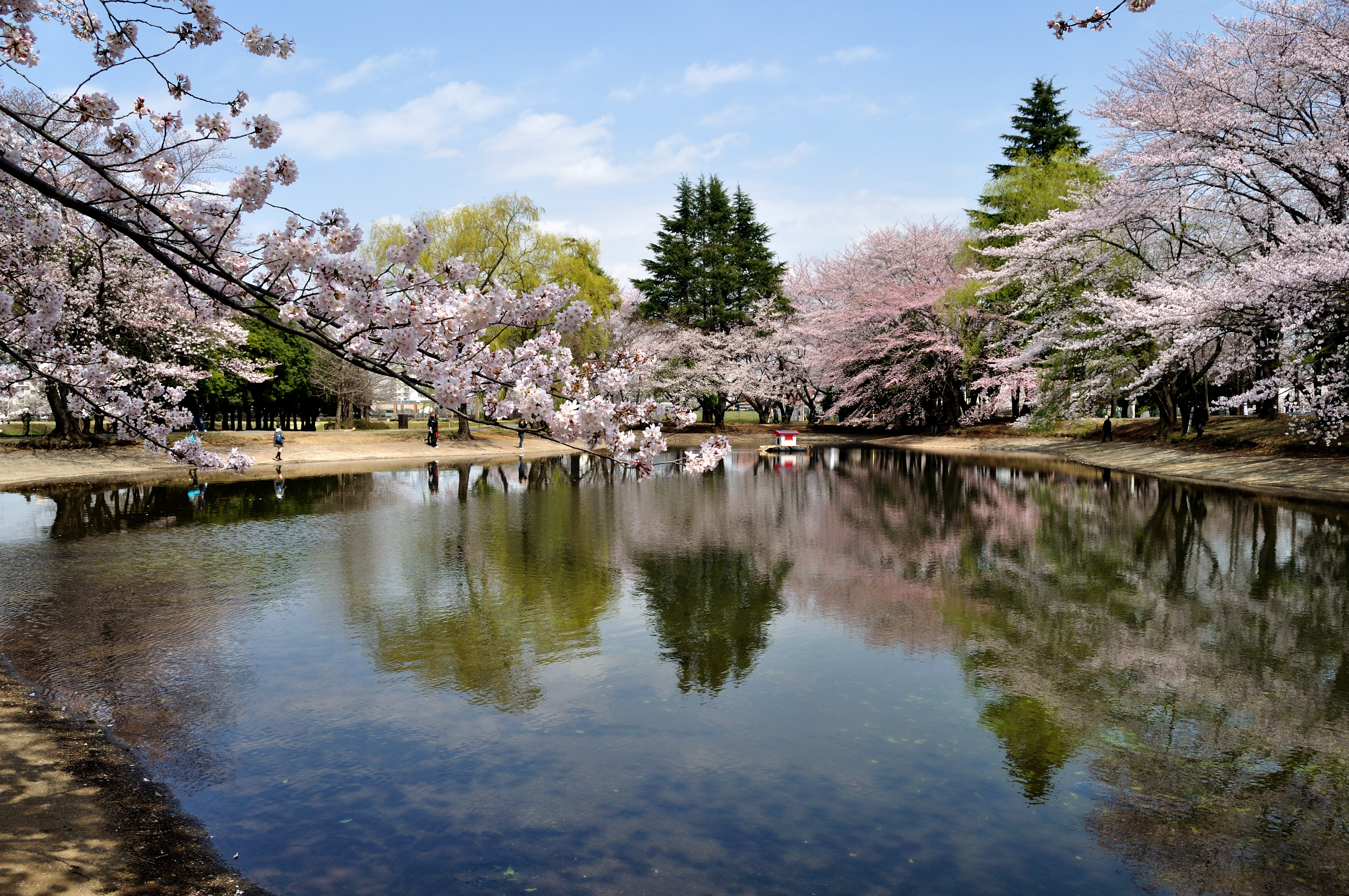
Camp Asaka

- Eastern Army, at Camp Asaka in Nerima
  - 1st Division, at Camp Nerima in Nerima, responsible for the defense of Tokyo and the Chiba, Ibaraki, Kanagawa, Saitama, Shizuoka and Yamanashi prefectures.
    - 1st Infantry Regiment, at Camp Nerima in Nerima
    - 32nd Infantry Regiment, at Camp Omiya in Saitama
    - 34th Infantry Regiment, at Camp Itazuma in Gotemba
  - 12th Brigade (Air Assault), at Camp Soumagahara in Shintō, responsible for the defense of Gunma, Nagano, Niigata and Tochigi prefectures.
    - 2nd Infantry Regiment, at Camp Takada in Jōetsu
    - 13th Infantry Regiment, at Camp Matsumoto in Matsumoto
    - 30th Infantry Regiment, at Camp Shibata in Shibata
  - Eastern Army Artillery Regiment, at Camp Kita Fuji in Oshino
    - 1st Artillery Battalion, at Camp Kita Fuji in Oshino
    - 2nd Artillery Battalion, at Camp Utsunomiya in Utsunomiya
    - Target Acquisition Battery, at Camp Kita Fuji in Oshino
  - Eastern Army Air Corps, at Camp Tachikawa in Tachikawa
    - 111th Aviation Squadron, at Kisarazu Airfield in Kisarazu
    - Eastern Army Helicopter Battalion, at Camp Tachikawa in Tachikawa
    - Eastern Army Air Traffic Control and Meteorological Company, iat Camp Tachikawa in Tachikawa
    - Eastern Army Airfield Maintenance Company, at Camp Tachikawa in Tachikawa
  - Eastern Army Combined (Training) Brigade, at Camp Takeyama in Yokosuka
    - 31st Infantry Regiment (Reserve), at Camp Takeyama in Yokosuka
    - 48th Infantry Regiment (Reserve), at Camp Soumagahara in Shintō
    - 3rd Non-Commissioned Officer Training Battalion, at Camp Itazuma in Gotemba
    - 117th Training Battalion, at Camp Takeyama in Yokosuka
    - Female Personnel Training Battalion, at Camp Asaka in Nerima
  - 1st Engineer Brigade, at Camp Koga in Koga
    - 4th Engineer Group (Construction), at Camp Zama in Sagamihara
    - 5th Engineer Group (Construction), at Camp Takada in Jōetsu
    - 101st Equipment Battalion, at Camp Koga in Koga
    - 301st Vehicle Company, at Camp Koga in Koga
    - 306th Engineer Company, at Camp Matsumoto in Matsumoto
    - 307th Engineer Company, at Camp Utsunomiya in Utsunomiya
  - Eastern Army Signals Regiment, at Camp Asaka in Asaka
    - 105th Command Post Signals Battalion, at Camp Asaka in Asaka
    - 105th Base Systems Signals Battalion, at Camp Asaka in Asaka
    - 304th Central Signals Company, at Camp Asaka in Asaka
  - Eastern Army Logistic Support, at Camp Asaka in Asaka
    - 101st General Support Battalion, at Camp Kasumigaura in Tsuchiura
    - 103rd Supply Battalion (Reserve), at Camp Kasumigaura in Tsuchiura
    - 104th General Support Battalion, at Camp Asaka in Asaka
    - 105th General Support Battalion, at Camp Fuji in Oyama
    - 102nd Engineer Support Battalion (supports the 1st Engineer Brigade), at Camp Koga in Koga
    - Eastern Army Transport Battalion, at Camp Asaka in Asaka
    - 102nd Explosive Ordnance Disposal Company, at Camp Asaka in Asaka
    - 301st Anti-Aircraft Support Company (supports the 2nd Anti-Aircraft Artillery Group), at Camp Matsudo in Matsudo
    - 301st Signals Support Company (supports the Eastern Army Signals Regiment), at Camp Asaka in Asaka
    - 302nd Ammunition Company (Reserve), at Camp Kasumigaura in Tsuchiura
    - 302nd Infantry Support Company (supports the 31st Infantry Regiment), at Camp Takeyama in Yokosuka
    - 303rd Infantry Support Company (supports the 48th Infantry Regiment), at Camp Soumagahara in Shintō
    - 306th Artillery Support Company (supports the Eastern Army Artillery Regiment), at Camp Kita Fuji in Oshino
    - Camp Fuji Schools Support Battalion, at Camp Fuji in Oyama
    - Anti-Aircraft Training Support Company (supports the Anti-Aircraft Artillery School), at Camp Shimizu in Chiba
    - Engineer Training Support Company (supports the Engineer School), at Camp Katsuta in Hitachinaka
    - Signals Training Support Company (supports the Signals and Cyber School), at Camp Kurihama in Yokosuka
  - 2nd Anti-Aircraft Artillery Group, at Camp Matsudo in Matsudo, with Type 3 Chū-SAMs
  - Eastern Army Intelligence Corps, at Camp Asaka in Asaka
  - Eastern Army Medical Corps, at Camp Asaka in Asaka
  - Eastern Army Command Post Training Support Company, at Camp Asaka in Asaka
  - Eastern Army Accounting Company, at Camp Asaka in Asaka
  - Eastern Army Band, at Camp Asaka in Asaka

=== Eastern Army organization graphic ===
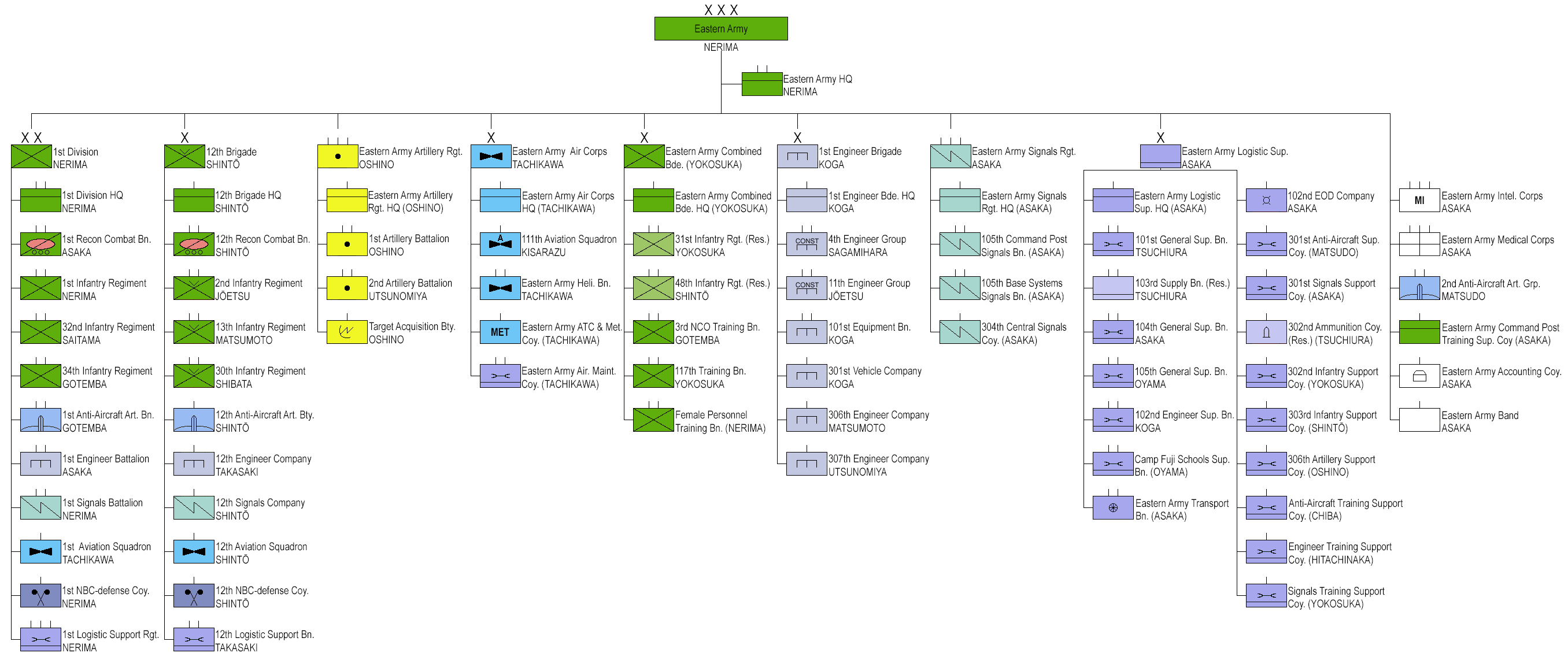
Eastern Army organization as of March 2026 (click image to enlarge)
