= 4th Division (Japan) =

- 4th Division Distinctive Unit Insignia
- Active: 15 August 1962 – present
- Country: Japan
- Branch: Japan Ground Self-Defense Force
- Type: Infantry division
- Size: about 8000 soldiers
- Part of: Western Army
- Garrison/HQ: Kasuga

Commanders
- Current commander: Lt. Gen. Akira Fukatsu

The 4th Division (第4師団) is one of nine active divisions of the Japan Ground Self-Defense Force. The division is subordinated to the Western Army and is headquartered in Kasuga, Fukuoka. Its responsibility is the defense of the Fukuoka, Nagasaki, Ōita and Saga prefectures.

The division was established on 15 August 1962.

== Organization ==
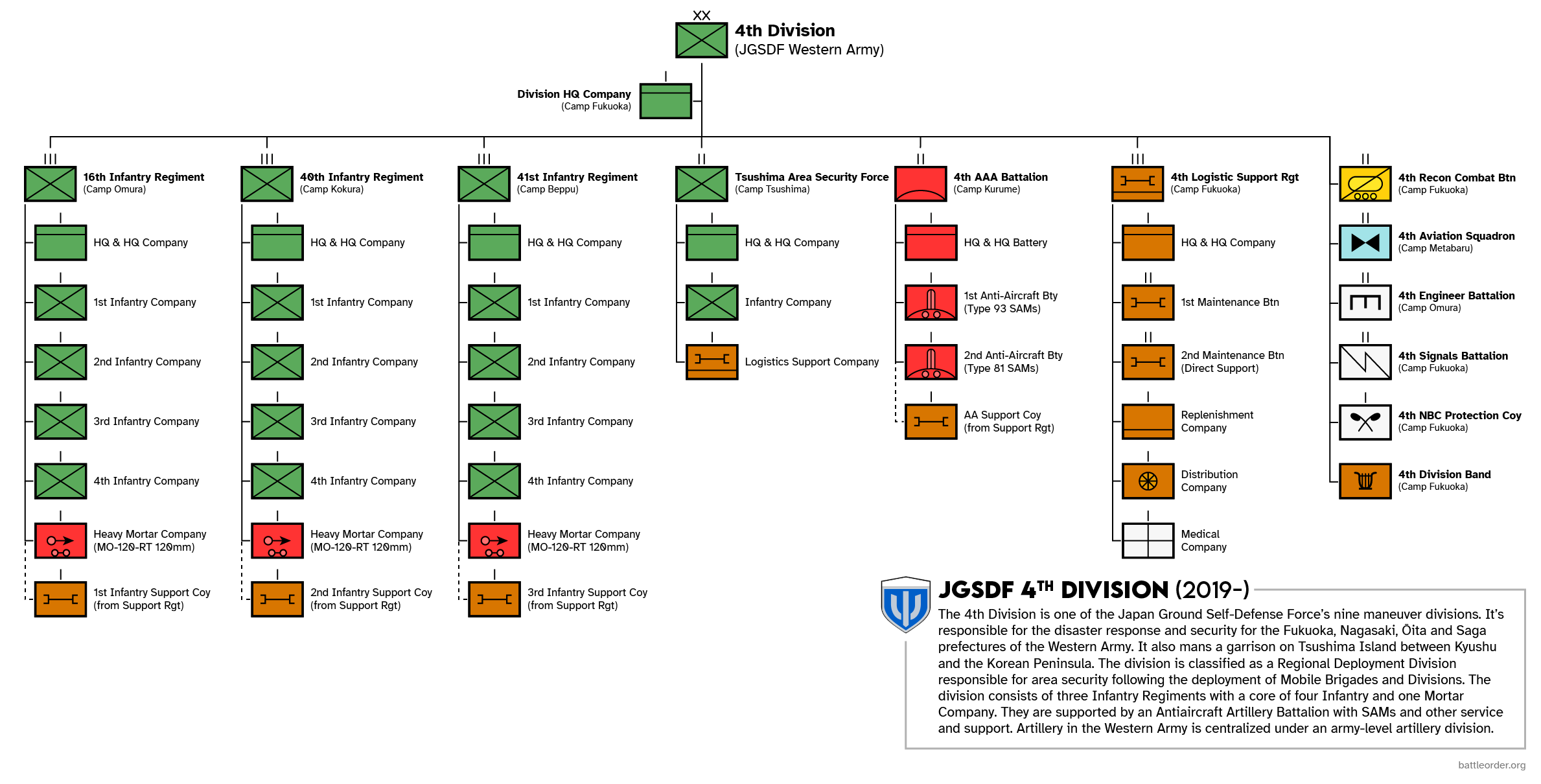
JGSDF 4th Division organization in 2022

- 4th Division, in Kasuga
  - 4th Division HQ, in Kasuga
  - 16th Infantry Regiment ^{note 1}, in Ōmura, with Type 96 armored personnel carriers
  - 40th Infantry Regiment, in Kitakyūshū
  - 41st Infantry Regiment, in Beppu
  - Tsushima Security Unit, in Tsushima, with 1 × headquarters, 1 × infantry, and 1 × logistic support company
  - 4th Reconnaissance Combat Battalion, in Kasuga, with Type 16 maneuver combat vehicles, and Type 87 armored reconnaissance vehicles
  - 4th Intelligence Company, in Kasuga, with ScanEagle
  - 4th Anti-Aircraft Artillery Battalion, in Kurume, with Type 81 and Type 93 surface-to-air missile systems
  - 4th Engineer Battalion (Combat), in Ōmura
  - 4th Signal Battalion, in Kasuga
  - 4th Aviation Squadron, in Yoshinogari, flying UH-1J and OH-6D helicopters
  - 4th NBC-defense Company, in Kasuga
  - 4th Logistic Support Regiment, in Kasuga
    - 1st Maintenance Battalion
    - 2nd Maintenance Battalion
    - Supply Company
    - Medical Company
    - Transport Company

note 1: Infantry regiments have only battalion strength.
