= 2023 Miyakojima helicopter crash =

Helicopter crash in Japan

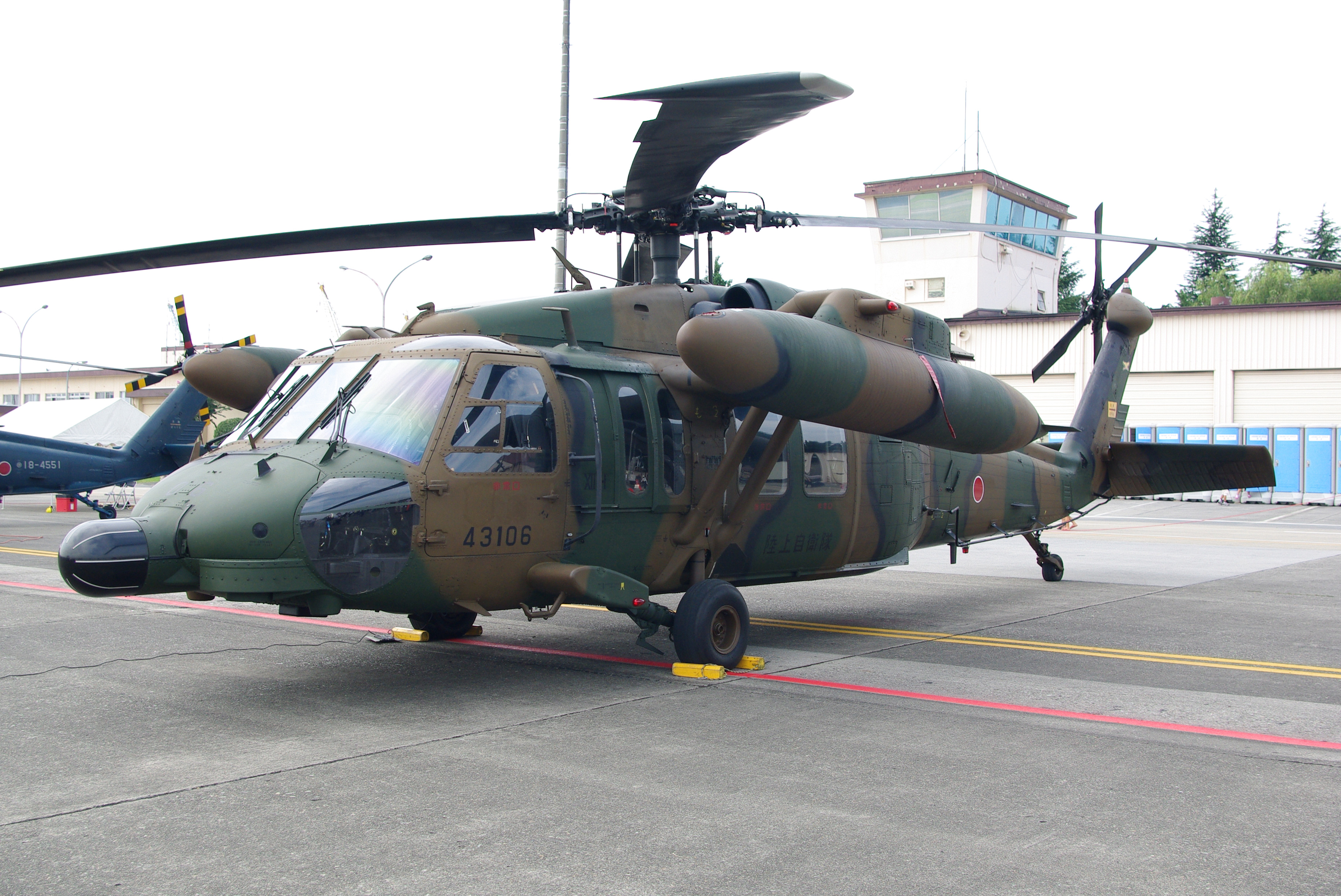
- The UH-60JA aircraft that was involved in this incident, photographed in 2009.

Accident
- Date: April 6, 2023
- Summary: Engine failure
- Site: Off the coast of Miyako-jima, Okinawa Prefecture, Japan

Aircraft
- Aircraft type: Mitsubishi UH-60JA
- Operator: Japan Ground Self-Defense Force (JGSDF)
- Registration: JG-3106
- Flight origin: JASDF Miyakojima Sub Base
- Destination: JASDF Miyakojima Sub Base
- Occupants: 10
- Crew: 10
- Fatalities: 10
- Survivors: 0

The 2023 Miyakojima helicopter crash was an aircraft accident that occurred on April 6, 2023, when a Japan Ground Self-Defense Force Mitsubishi UH-60JA helicopter carrying 10 people, including the commander of the 8th Division, LTG Yuichi Sakamoto, went missing off the coast of Miyako-jima in Okinawa, Japan.

The helicopter, which belonged to the 8th Aviation Squadron of the 8th Division, departed the Miyakojima Sub Base of the Japan Air Self-Defense Force to conduct terrain reconnaissance of the island, with Lt. Gen. Sakamoto and Col. Masaichi Iyoda, commander of JGSDF Camp Miyakojima, among the 10 personnel on board. The helicopter vanished from radar at about 18 km (approx. 11 miles) northwest, just two minutes after making contact with air traffic control at Shimojishima Airport.

== Aircraft ==
The aircraft involved, registration JG-3106/43106, was a Mitsubishi UH-60JA, which was based on the Sikorsky S-70, commonly known as the Blackhawk, was used by all of the branches of Japan Self-Defense Forces. The involved aircraft, UH-60JA is a utility version for the Japan Ground Self-Defense Force. This aircraft was known for its reliability within the force, since it had double engines that were able to operate even when one was out.

== Flight ==
Journey of the helicopter to the crash.

All times are in JST, and in 24-hour notation.

At 15:46 on April 6, 2023, the UH-60JA utility helicopter belonging to the 8th Aviation Squadron of the 8th Division (registration number: 43106^{A}, Hereinafter referred to as "helicopter".) departed the Miyakojima Sub Base of the Japan Air Self-Defense Force to conduct terrain reconnaissance of the island, carrying 2 pilots, 2 mechanics and 6 members for the reconnaissance mission (including LTG Yuichi Sakamoto, commander of the 8th Division). At that time, the helicopter communicated with the air traffic control, "We have taken off, will be flying over the coastline." The air traffic controller instructed to change to a different control area, saying, "Contact the air traffic controller in Shimojishima on the next frequency." The helicopter side replied, "Understood." (These are normal communications)

At about 15:51:30, the security camera installed facing east at Karimata Elementary School in Miyakojima captured images of the helicopter flying normally.

At about 15:53:17, the security camera installed facing north at Ikema Elementary and Junior High School in Miyakojima captured the helicopter flying normally. As a result of video analysis of these two school security cameras, it was flying at an altitude of about 195m (about 640 ft) at about 237 km/h (about 147 mph) (UH-60JA's normal cruising speed is about 240 km/h, which is normal flight speed). It seems that the altitude is about 45m higher than the minimum safe altitude stipulated by the Civil Aeronautics Act. In addition, former Lt. Gen. Koichi Isobe (was a helicopter pilot), who confirmed these two videos, said, "It looks like it was flying normally, not in a way that would interfere with the flight."

At about 15:54, the ATC from Shimojishima said, "When you enter the air traffic control area of Shimojishima Airport, contact the Shimojishima ATC frequency." This was the last communication exchange, and there was no communication to report anomalies. It was also around this point that an American tourist, a former sailor of the US Navy, took a video of the helicopter flying at about 400–450 metres (1,310–1,480 feet) in altitude along the eastern coast of Ikema Island. At this point, the helicopter was flying straight, the sound was normal and no abnormalities were observed.

At 15:56, the helicopter vanished from the radar in the oceanic airspace about 18 km northwest of Miyako Airport. The helicopter flew almost as planned at an altitude of 150 m (490 ft) until just before it disappeared, and there were no radio communications to notify emergency situations, no emergency transponder signals that are transmitted when a crew member evacuates (Squawk 7700) and no emergency radios^{B} were transmitted.

At the time of the accident, the visibility was over 10 kilometres (6.2 miles), the weather was clear, the south wind was about 7m, the wave height was about 1m. There was no noticeable development of cumulonimbus clouds, and no lightning was detected. In addition, the depth of water in the sea area around the site is 20m at the shallowest point and 200m at the deepest point. No damage has been confirmed to vessels to area around the site or in the sea area. The last known altitude of the helicopter is the lowest limit of the safe flight altitude stipulated by the Civil Aeronautics Law, which meant there was no legal problem, and it was the usual flight method for the JGSDF helicopters.

After late March 2023, the involved helicopter underwent a special inspection after flying for 50 hours, and as a result of a safety confirmation flight, it was determined that there were no problems with the aircraft. Upon examination of the recovered slider door, it was found that it had been locked, and there was no sign of any attempt to open it in an emergency. There is a high possibility that it was an extremely short time from the occurrence of the anomaly to the crash, and it is possible that the sudden anomaly occurred in about 2 minutes from the last communication to the disappearance from the radar and the crash occurred.

By the night of April 13, a total of 22 fragments and parts of the helicopter had been found and recovered, of which 15 were recovered along the coast and offshore of Irabu Island to the south of the accident site, and 7 were recovered from the sea area to the north of the accident site.

Around 8:30 on April 16, a saturation diver who dived from the submarine rescue ship "Chihaya" found the fuselage of the accident aircraft and five people (which looked like crew members) on the seabed at a depth of 106 metres (348 feet) on the north side of the Irabu Island. As of the night of April 16, two of the five people found on the seafloor have been confirmed dead.

The Flight Data Recorder (hereinafter referred to as "FDR") has not been recovered, but this is due to unique reasons to GSDF. In the case of Maritime and Air Self-Defense Force helicopters, which often fly over the ocean, the FDR is attached to the outside of the aircraft, and when it detects a unique impact, it automatically ejects itself and separates from the aircraft, making it easy to find in the event of an accident. It has a strobe light emission and a function to emit a position signal. However, in the case of Ground Self-Defense Force helicopters, since most of their flights are on land, if a small FDR separates in the event of an accident, even if there is a strobe light, it is rather difficult to search in the wilderness or forest, and it is easy for the enemy to take it away. It is installed inside the aircraft and does not have a position transmission function by itself. For these reasons, it is thought that recovery is not possible unless the entire aircraft is found and recovered.

It was also determined that this helicopter was not equipped with emergency floats. According to the Civil Aeronautics Act, the float is required to be installed on "helicopters that fly over water without islands for 30 minutes or more, or that also fly 185 kilometres (115 miles) or more." As government helicopters, the Maritime Self-Defense Force and the Japan Coast Guard equip all aircraft, and the Ground Self-Defense Force equips aircraft deployed in the Okinawa area, but the aircraft of the 8th Division (Kyushu area) is within the normal operation range. It was not equipped because there were no isolated islands that exceeded the provisions stipulated by the Civil Aviation Law. In addition, this flight is also flying via the island in a stepping stone style, which meant there was no legal problem.

Part of the helicopter was recovered on May 2, 2023, along with 6 out of the 10 deceased crew members.

== Attack theories ==
The possibility of an attack has also been rumored, but a senior Ministry of Defense official has denied this. The reason for this is that when attacked by weapons, including drones, there is a loud explosion sound, but even though there were multiple residents who heard the flight sound or saw the image of the aircraft just before the accident, no sound of the explosion was heard. There is no testimony, and radars such as those of the Self-Defense Forces have not detected any hostile projectiles. Also, an electromagnetic wave attack would affect air traffic control and private communications on Miyako Island, but there are no reports or testimonials to that effect. In addition, if it were shot down by a weapon, the parts of the helicopter would scatter and a large amount of floating matter would be created, but what was actually discovered was only the outer parts of the fuselage that were easy to come off, including large doors and other prototypes. Among them, it is mentioned that the large doors and other parts discovered are also kept in their original form.

In the congress, a party member brought up the accident and asked, "Is there absolutely no connection between the Chinese warship passing between the main island of Okinawa and Miyakojima just before?" Defense Minister Yasukazu Hamada responded, "There is no relevant information in the report to me at this time. I would like to refrain from talking about anything definite at this time.".

Taro Yamato, Deputy Director-General of the Joint Staff Office of the Ministry of Defense, said, "The actions of the Chinese naval vessels all took place in the early hours of the 6th, and since they differed greatly from the time of the accident, they cannot be considered to be related. We have not been able to confirm any movements of the Chinese military in connection with this accident."

Former General Takashi Fukuyama said, "It is impossible to shoot down with an existing modern weapon because there is no radar detection and no evidence of the explosion sound. However, the possibility that it was shot down with some new weapon cannot be denied. The Chinese side would suffer a massive disadvantage if it were discovered that they had shot down a high-ranking officer's plane, so there is almost no possibility. "

== Investigation ==
The Ground Self-Defense Force established an accident investigation committee and decided to ground the aircraft except for disaster relief missions such as transporting emergency patients. In addition, the helicopter of the same system operated by the Maritime Self-Defense Force and the Air Self-Defense Force have different specifications from this model, so it was determined that there were no problem to continue to operate.

The cause of this accident is officially published by the JGSDF on March 14, 2024. The investigation determined that the No. 2 Engine and No. 1 Engine lost power in sequence, and while the failure of No. 2 Engine is attributed to an undocumented, assumed temporary issue called "rollback" either in the engine control system or relevant pneumatic lines, the reason for the failure of No. 1 Engine could not be ascertained. The committee made several safety recommendations regarding inspections of engines, documentation of abnormal behaviours and crew training.

== See also ==
- UH-60JA - Aircraft involved in the crash
- 8th Division - Senior division that the aircraft belonged to
- List of aircraft accidents

== Notes ==
A. Registration number. The production number is 106, the aircraft number is JG-3106 (on the tail), and 06 is on the front of the fuselage, however both refer to the same aircraft.
B. A device that automatically issues a distress signal when it detects a large impact or flooding. It continues transmitting for more than 24 hours underwater, and its position error is within 3km.
