= 15th Brigade (Japan) =

- 15th Brigade Distinctive Unit Insignia
- Active: 26 March 2010 – present
- Country: Japan
- Branch: Japan Ground Self-Defense Force
- Type: Brigade
- Size: 2500 soldiers
- Part of: Western Army
- Garrison/HQ: Naha

Commanders
- Current commander: Maj. Gen. Hideki Agario

The 15th Brigade (第15旅団) is one of eight active brigades of the Japan Ground Self-Defense Force. The brigade is subordinated to the Western Army and is headquartered in Naha, Okinawa. Its responsibility is the defense of Okinawa Prefecture.

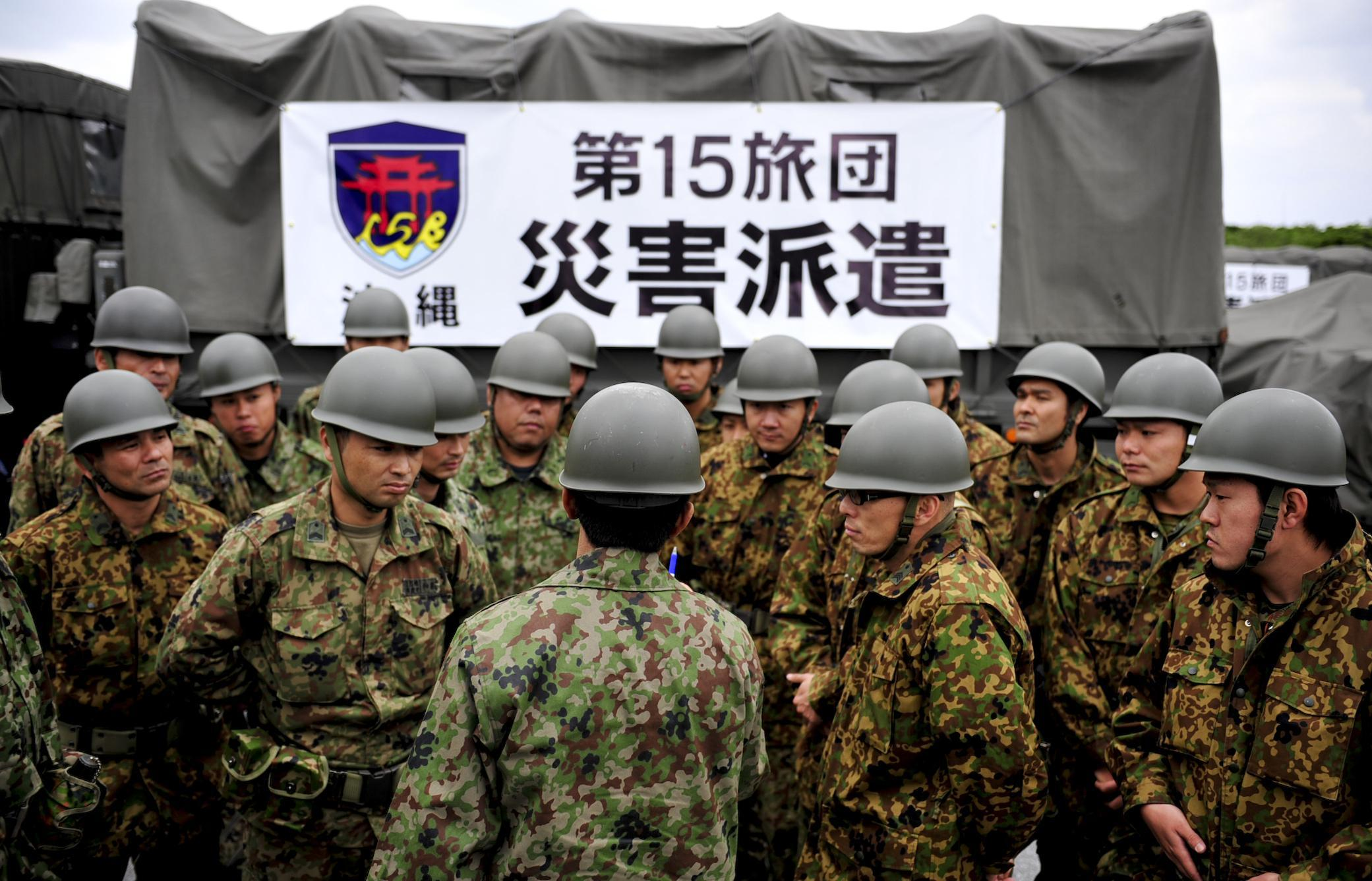
2011 Tōhoku earthquake and tsunami disaster relief, the Northeast 15th Brigade carries out a dispatch

== History ==
The 15th Brigade was raised to replace the 1st Combined Brigade on March 26, 2010.

In September 2025 it was reported that it is planned for the brigade to be nominally upgraded into a division in 2026.

== Organization ==
- 15th Brigade, in Naha
  - 15th Brigade HQ, in Naha
  - 51st Infantry Regiment ^{note 1}, in Naha, with 1 × headquarters, 3 × infantry, and 1 × 120 mm mortar company
  - 15th Anti-Aircraft Artillery Regiment, in Yaese, with three Type 3 Chū-SAM, and one Type 11 Surface-to-air missile battery
  - Miyako Security Unit, in Miyakojima, with 1 × headquarters, 1 × infantry, and 1 × logistic support company
  - Yaeyama Security Unit, in Ishigaki, with 1 × headquarters, 1 × infantry, and 1 × logistic support company
  - 15th Reconnaissance Company, in Naha, with Type 87 armored reconnaissance vehicles
  - 15th Intelligence Company, in Naha, with ScanEagle
  - 15th Engineer Company (Combat), in Naha
  - 15th Signal Company, in Naha
  - 15th Aviation Squadron, at Naha Air Base, flying UH-60JA and CH-47J/JA helicopters
  - 15th NBC-defense Company, in Naha
  - 101st Explosive Ordnance Disposal Company, in Naha
  - 15th Logistic Support Battalion, in Naha

note 1: Infantry Regiments have only battalion strength.
