= 8th Division (Japan) =

- 8th Division Distinctive Unit Insignia
- Active: 18 January 1962 – present
- Country: Japan
- Branch: Japan Ground Self-Defense Force
- Type: Infantry division
- Size: 6,100 soldiers or ~5,000
- Part of: Western Army
- Garrison/HQ: Kumamoto

Commanders
- Current commander: Lt. Gen. Shinichi Aoki
- Notable commanders: Lt. Gen. Yuichi Sakamoto see 2023 Miyakojima helicopter crash

The 8th Division (第8師団) is one of nine active divisions of the Japan Ground Self-Defense Force. The division is subordinated to the Western Army and is headquartered in Kumamoto. Its responsibility is the defense of the Kagoshima, Kumamoto and Miyazaki prefectures.

The division was raised on 18 January 1962.

== Organization ==
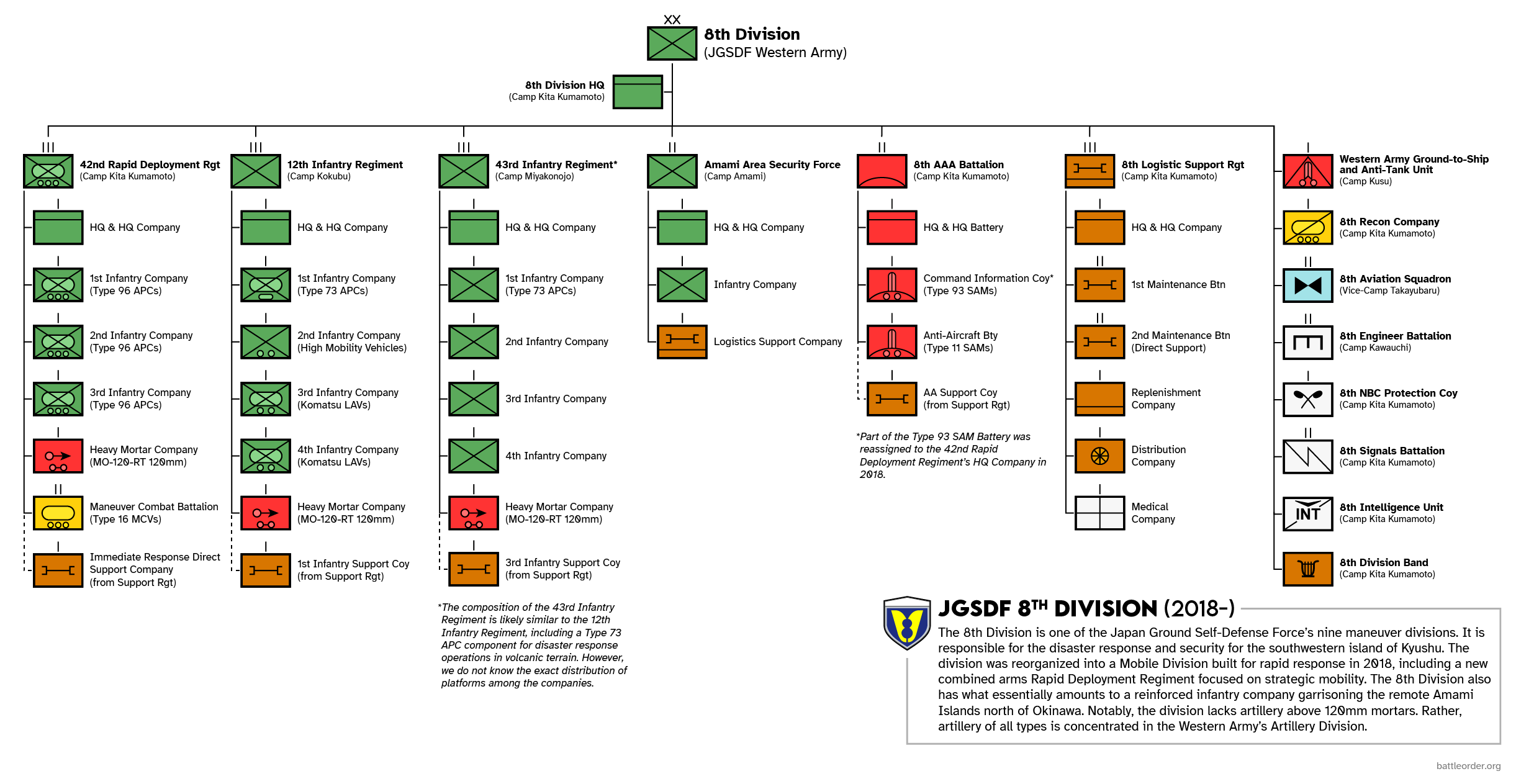
JGSDF 8th Division organization

- 8th Division, in Kumamoto
  - 8th Division HQ, in Kumamoto
  - 12th Infantry Regiment, in Kirishima, with 1 × headquarters, four Type 73 armored personnel carrier, and 1 × 120 mm mortar company
  - 42nd Rapid Deployment Regiment, in Kumamoto, with 1 × headquarters, three Type 96 armored personnel carrier, 1 × Type 16 maneuver combat vehicle, and 1 × 120 mm F1 mortar company
  - 43rd Infantry Regiment, in Miyakonojō, with 1 × headquarters, four Type 73 armored personnel carrier, and 1 × 120 mm mortar company
  - Amami Security Unit, Amami, with 1 × headquarters, 1 × infantry, and 1 × logistic support company
  - 8th Anti-Aircraft Artillery Battalion, in Kumamoto, with Type 81 and Type 93 surface-to-air missile systems
  - 8th Engineer Battalion (Combat), in Satsumasendai
  - 8th Signal Battalion, in Kumamoto
  - 8th Reconnaissance Company, in Kumamoto, with Type 87 reconnaissance vehicles
  - 8th Intelligence Company, in Kumamoto, with ScanEagle
  - 8th Aviation Squadron, in Mashiki, flying UH-1J and OH-6D helicopters
  - 8th NBC-defense Company, in Kumamoto
  - Western Army Tank Battalion, in Kusu, with Type 10 main battle tanks and Type 96 armored personnel carriers (administrative control during peacetime)
  - Western Army Anti-tank/Anti-ship Company, in Kusu, with Type 96 multi-purpose missile system (administrative control during peacetime)
  - 8th Logistic Support Regiment, in Kumamoto
    - 1st Maintenance Battalion
    - 2nd Maintenance Battalion
    - Supply Company
    - Medical Company
    - Transport Company
