= Western Army (Japan) =

- Western Army Distinctive Unit Insignia
- Active: 1 December 1955 – present
- Country: Japan
- Branch: Japan Ground Self-Defense Force
- Type: Field army
- Garrison/HQ: Camp Kengun, Kumamoto, Kyūshū

Commanders
- Current commander: Lt. Gen. Ryoji Takemoto

The Western Army (西部方面隊) is one of five active Armies of the Japan Ground Self-Defense Force. It is headquartered in Kumamoto, Kumamoto Prefecture. Its responsibility is the defense of Kyūshū and Okinawa.

== Organization ==
- Western Army, in Kumamoto
  - 4th Division, in Kasuga, responsible for the defense of the Fukuoka, Nagasaki, Ōita and Saga prefectures
    - 16th Infantry Regiment, in Ōmura
    - 40th Infantry Regiment, in Kitakyūshū
    - 41st Infantry Regiment, in Beppu
  - 8th Division, in Kumamoto, responsible for the defense of the Kagoshima, Kumamoto and Miyazaki prefectures
    - 12th Infantry Regiment, in Kirishima
    - 42nd Rapid Deployment Regiment, in Kumamoto
    - 43rd Infantry Regiment, in Miyakonojō
  - 15th Brigade, in Naha, responsible for the defense of Okinawa Prefecture
    - 51st Infantry Regiment, in Naha
  - 2nd Artillery Brigade, in Yufu
    - 5th Surface-to-Ship Missile Regiment, in Kumamoto, with Type 12 surface-to-ship missile
    - 7th Surface-to-Ship Missile Regiment, in Uruma, with Type 12 surface-to-ship missile
    - 8th Surface-to-Ship Missile Regiment, in Yufu, with Type 12 surface-to-ship missile
    - 301st MLRS Battery, in Yufu, with M270 Multiple Launch Rocket System
    - Western Army Artillery Regiment, in Kumamoto
      - 1st Artillery Battalion, in Kumamoto, with Type 19 155 mm wheeled self-propelled howitzers
      - 2nd Artillery Battalion, in Kusu, with Type 19 155 mm wheeled self-propelled howitzers
      - 3rd Artillery Battalion, in Ebino, with Type 19 155 mm wheeled self-propelled howitzers
      - 4th Artillery Battalion, in Kurume, with FH70 155 mm towed howitzers
      - Target Acquisition Battery, in Kumamoto
  - 2nd Anti-Aircraft Artillery Brigade, in Iizuka
    - 3rd Anti-Aircraft Artillery Group, in Iizuka, with Type 3 Chū-SAMs
    - 7th Anti-Aircraft Artillery Group, in Miyakojima, with Type 3 Chū-SAMs
    - 102nd Anti-Aircraft Artillery Battery, in Ōmura, with Type 3 Chū-SAMs
    - 304th Unmanned Aerial Vehicles Battery (Target Towing), in Iizuka
  - Western Army Air Corps, in Mashiki
    - 1st Attack Helicopter Battalion, at Metabaru Airfield in Yoshinogari
    - Western Army Helicopter Battalion, at Metabaru Airfield in Yoshinogari
    - Western Army Air Traffic Control and Meteorological Company, in Mashiki
    - Western Army Airfield Maintenance Company, in Mashiki
  - Western Army Combined (Training) Brigade, in Kurume
    - 19th Infantry Regiment (Reserve), in Kasuga
    - 24th Infantry Regiment (Reserve), in Ebino
    - 5th Non-Commissioned Officer Training Battalion, in Kurume
    - 113th Training Battalion, in Kirishima
    - 118th Training Battalion, in Kurume
  - 5th Engineer Brigade, in Ogōri
    - 2nd Engineer Group (Construction), in Iizuka
    - 9th Engineer Group (Construction), in Ogōri
    - 103rd Equipment Battalion, in Ogōri
    - 303rd Beach Obstacle Company, in Ogōri
    - 305th Vehicle Company, in Ogōri
  - Western Army Signals Regiment, in Kumamoto
    - 102nd Base Systems Signals Battalion, in Kumamoto
    - 103rd Command Post Signals Battalion, in Kumamoto
    - 302nd Central Signals Company, in Kumamoto
    - 101st Transport Company, in Kumamoto
  - Western Army Logistic Support, in Yoshinogari
    - 102nd Artillery Support Battalion (supports the 2nd Artillery Brigade), in Yufu
    - 102nd Anti-Aircraft Support Battalion (supports the 2nd Anti-Aircraft Artillery Brigade), in Iizuka
    - 103rd Engineer Support Battalion (supports the 5th Engineer Brigade), in Ogōri
    - 103rd Ammunition Battalion (Reserve), in Yoshinogari
    - 105th Supply Battalion (Reserve), in Yoshinogari
    - 106th General Support Battalion, in Yoshinogari
    - Western Army Transport Battalion, in Kumamoto
    - 104th Explosive Ordnance Disposal Company, in Yoshinogari
    - 301st Signals Support Company (supports the Western Army Signals Regiment), in Kumamoto
    - 304th Infantry Support Company (supports the 19th Infantry Regiment), in Kasuga
    - 308th Infantry Support Company (supports the 24th Infantry Regiment), in Ebino
  - Western Army Intelligence Corps, in Kumamoto
  - Western Army Medical Corps, in Kumamoto
  - Western Army Tank Battalion, in Kusu, with Type 10 main battle tanks and Type 96 armored personnel carriers (under the 8th Division's administrative control in peacetime)
  - Western Army Anti-tank/Anti-ship Company, in Kusu, with Type 96 multi-purpose missile system (under the 8th Division's administrative control in peacetime)
  - Western Army Command Post Training Support Company, in Kumamoto
  - Western Army Accounting Company, in Kumamoto
  - Western Army Band, in Kumamoto

=== Western Army organization graphic ===
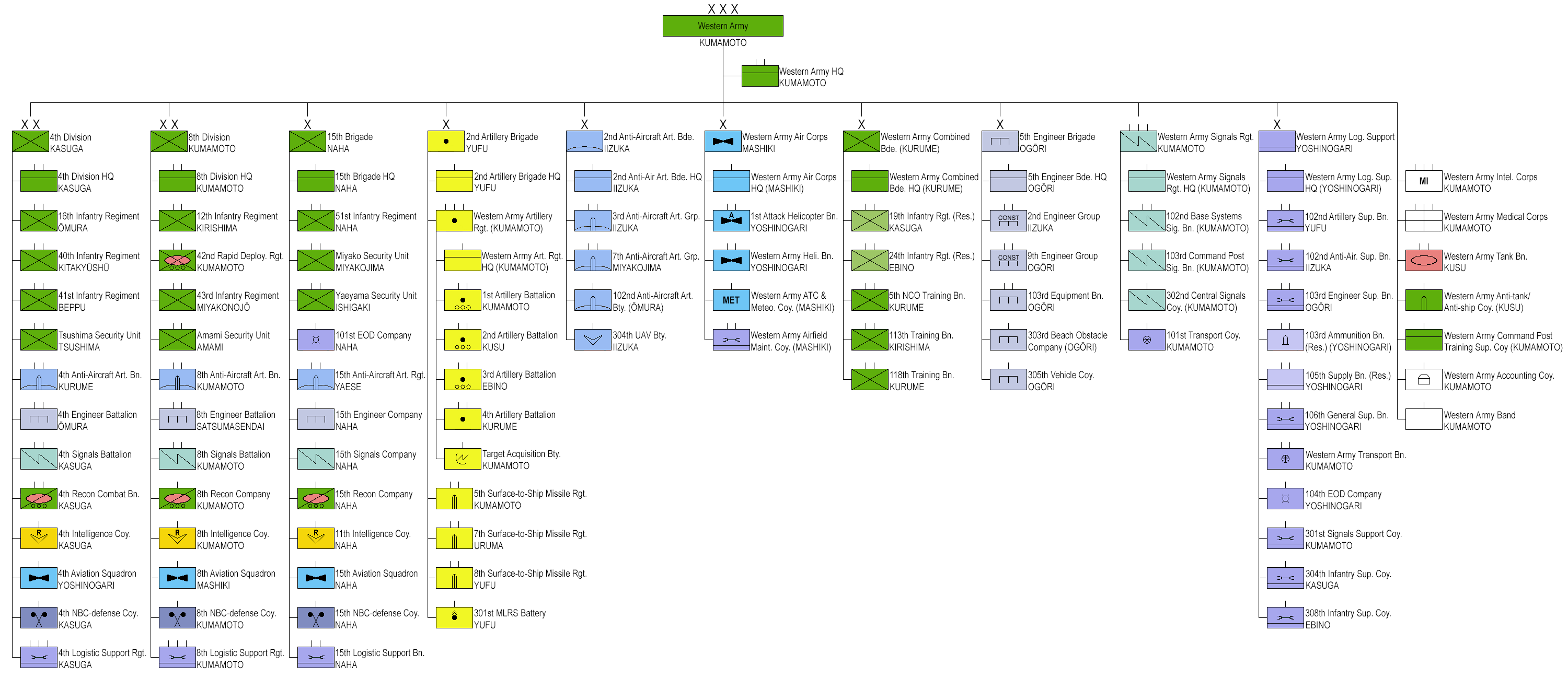
Western Army organization as of March 2026 (click image to enlarge)

== History ==
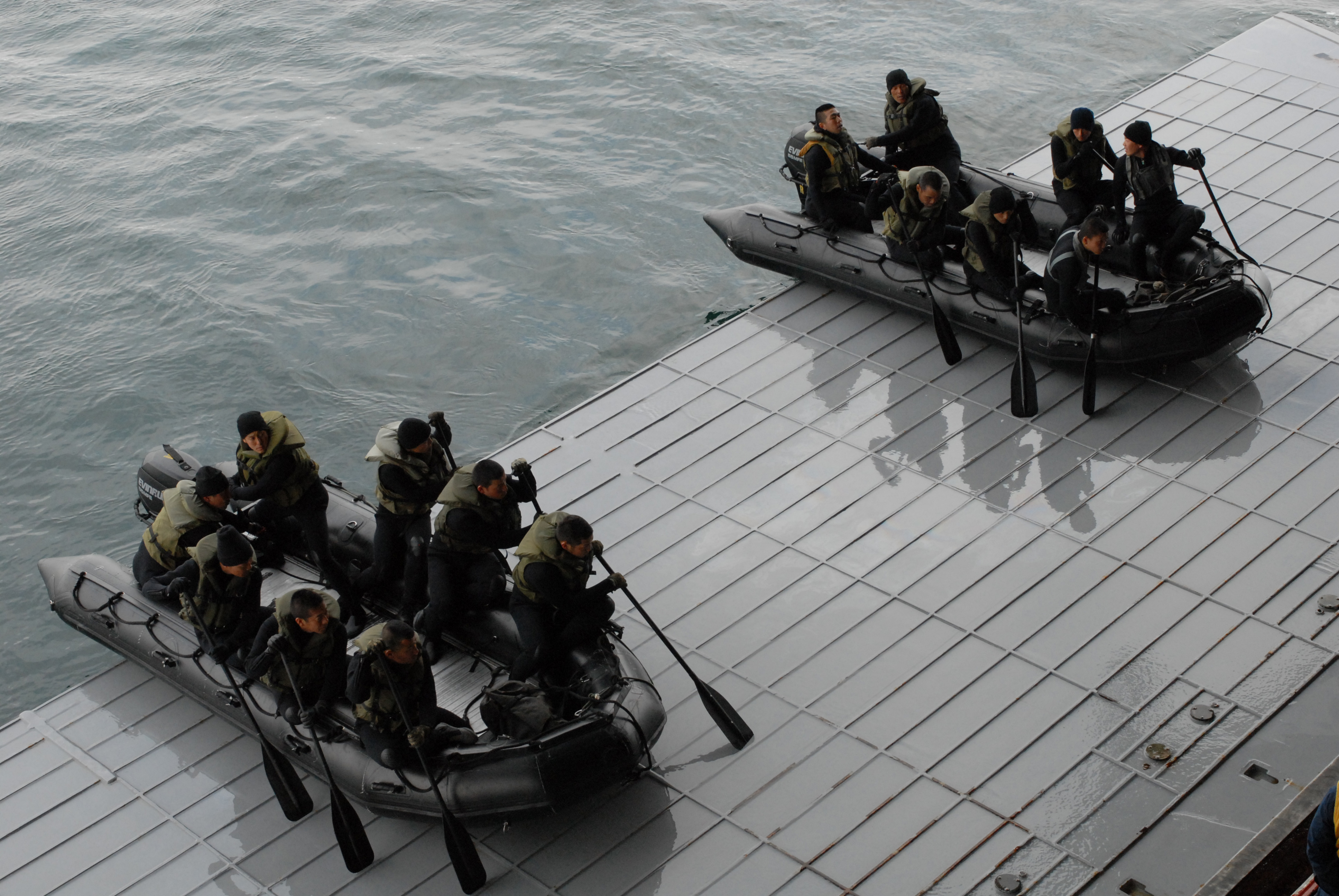
PACIFIC OCEAN (25 Feb. 2011) Soldiers from the Japan Ground Self-Defense Force, Western Army Infantry Regiment launch rigid-hull inflatable boats from the well deck of the amphibious assault ship USS Makin Island (LHD 8). Marines and Japanese soldiers are participating in Exercise Iron Fist, a bilateral training exercise to enhance their amphibious knowledge. (U.S. Navy photo by Aviation Structural Mechanic Airman Justin Joyner/Released)

In August 2010, a proposal was being considered by the then Japanese government to convert a conventional [battalion strength] regiment from either the 8th Division or the 15th Brigade into a "US-style" amphibious unit, effectively giving the Western Army a battalion of marines for dealing with contingencies. This proposal seems to have been shelved or fallen into limbo in the interim.

As of June 2013, as part of an ongoing expansion of defense capabilities in the Western Army's area of responsibility, the MOD were considering creating a special "isle assault unit", whose role would be the recapture of remote Japanese islands that had been invaded by a foreign power. It would share this mission with the pre-existing Western Army Infantry Regiment, itself currently undergoing an expansion in manpower and equipment (e.g. increase in authorised strength to 680 effectives, & adding (initially 4) AAVP-7A1's to its TOE). Equipment for the new unit on the other hand, may ultimately include the Type 16 maneuver combat vehicle and the light-weight combat vehicle (LCV) system, both of which were designed in part with the remote island defence mission in mind.

If stood up, the new unit together with the WAIR would form a major part of the Western Army's first response to a hostile incursion in the more remote parts of its AOR. In early September 2015, plans for the creation of the new unit, now referred to as an 'amphibious mobile unit' were confirmed. The new unit is to be stood up by the end of FY2017, with a training corps to be set up in the interim (by the end of FY2016).

In 2013 troops from the Western Army Infantry Regiment were deployed from the JS Hyuga and JS Shimokita for an amphibious warfare exercise in California.

On 29 March 2021, a JGSDF electronic warfare unit was raised at Camp Kengun.

On 29 March 2021, Western Army Artillery was reorganized to 2nd Artillery Brigade.

== Other developments ==
Under current plans, the Western Army will have priority on deliveries of the new Type 12 surface-to-ship missile upgrade (six sets on order to date [July 2013]). The Type 12 will be initially deployed with the 5th Anti-Ship Missile Regiment, but ultimately the 6th Anti-Ship Missile Regiment (deactivated 21 April 2011) may be reactivated to operate the new systems.

Note: GSDF Anti-Ship Missile Regiments are alternatively known as Surface-to-Surface Missile Regiments.
