= List of Yakushiji Ryōko no Kaiki Jikenbo episodes =

Yakushiji Ryōko no Kaiki Jikenbo DVD box set cover

Yakushiji Ryōko no Kaiki Jikenbo is a Japanese anime series directed by Tarō Iwasaki and animated by Doga Kobo. News of a TV adaptation for the novel series by Yoshiki Tanaka was announced in 2007.

Ryōko Yakushiji, a graduate of Tokyo University's Law Faculty, is currently among the youngest Superintendent in the Tokyo Metropolitan Police Department. With the assistance of her subordinate Junichirō Izumida, Ryōko works with her colleagues including her rival and fellow Superintendent Yukiko Muromachi, alongside JACES security forces personnel and her personal maids Lucienne and Marianne to investigate and resolve seemingly paranormal, supernatural or bizarre events before they go out of hand. The young Superintendent later becomes the target of a conspiracy, hatched from the shadows by an influential socialite named Ruriko Isurugi and supported by extremist factions in the Japan Private Police, Shiba and the JGSDF, aimed at creating a true Japanese military.

Yakushiji Ryōko no Kaiki Jikenbo originally aired on TVK from July 6 to September 28, 2008, for 13 episodes. (Note: Yakushiji Ryōko no Kaiki Jikenbo originally aired on TVK on Saturday 24:30, effectively Sunday at 12:30 a.m. JST.) The series later aired on BS11 Digital, Chiba TV, KBS Kyoto, Sun TV, Tokyo MX, TV Aichi, and Television Saitama. Titles of the opening and ending themes are rendered in French. The opening theme Thème Principal and ending themes À demain sur la lune (#1,3), Ryoko 2 (#2,6), Songe d'une nuit d'été (#4,7,9,10,12), La Vie en rose (#5), Le combat (#8,11) and Theme principal La chanson d'atsuko (#13) are all sung by KATSU.

DVDs of the series were released in Japan on September 26, 2008, October 22, 2008, December 25, 2008, and January 21, 2009. Each volume contains three episodes, except for the third volume which has four episodes.

The series began streaming in North America on RetroCrush as an exclusive title on November 5, 2021, under the name Ryoko's Case File.

== Episodes ==
No.	Title (Note: All English titles are taken from RetroCrush.)	Directed by	Written by	Original release date
1	"Ginza Crime Tower (1st part)" Transliteration: "Ginza Kuraimu Tawā (Zenpen)" (Japanese: 銀座クライムタワー (前編))	Taro Iwasaki	Hiroyuki Kawasaki	July 6, 2008
Superintendent Ryōko Yakushiji and her subordinate, Assistant Inspector Junichirō Izumida of the Tokyo Metropolitan Police Department, launch an investigation after they witness a man waste away from rapid muscular atrophy, emit fumes and die in a mummified state within seconds while in downtown Ginza. Although a clue points to a known religious cult, additional investigation leads them to an amakudari haven which Yakushiji later decides to take down. To achieve her goal, she has to endure the presence of her rival, fellow superintendent Yukiko Muromachi, and survive an assassination attempt. At the latter part of the episode, the manga author, Yoshiki Tanaka makes his cameo appearance signing an autograph for a female restaurant visitor.
2	"Ginza Crime Tower (2nd part)" Transliteration: "Ginza Kuraimu Tawā (Kōhen)" (Japanese: 銀座クライムタワー (後編))	Taro Iwasaki	Hiroyuki Kawasaki	July 13, 2008
While investigating the series of mummifications, Superintendent Yakushiji survives an attempt on her life by a cult member who claims that the deaths were necessary experiments to achieve a divine purpose. Through their findings, a link between the owner of the amakudari establishment and the cult leadership is confirmed. Yakushiji and Izumida then embark on a mission to destroy the cult and come across surprising discoveries as they do so.
3	"The Sakuradamon Incident"; Transliteration: "Sakuradamon Jihen" (Japanese: 桜田門事変)	Hiroshi Haraguchi	Hiroyuki Kawasaki	July 20, 2008
It is Assistant Inspector Izumida's day off and while the rest of Superintendent Yakushiji's staff can only hope that things turn out well in his absence, Yakushiji impatiently bide her time. Two newspaper reporters take issue with the young Superintendent's well-known notoriety within the police force as the successor of JACES and, in spite of having been warned against it, decide to stalk her in the hopes of digging up dirt they could use to appeal to public sentiment. Yakushiji then leads them across town through several establishments with Izumida in tow, having picked him up the moment office hours - and his day off - ended.
4	"Musashino Twilight"; Transliteration: "Musashino Sumire Irodoki" (Japanese: 武蔵野すみれいろどき)	Masahiko Watanabe	Kenichi Kanemaki	July 27, 2008
A series of gruesome murders occur within the vicinity of a park. Having gotten past her rival and fellow Superintendent, Yukiko Muromachi; Superintendent Yakushiji and her subordinate, Assistant Inspector Izumida question a former Minister of Health, Labour and Welfare for his involvement in the illegal experimentation involving human cells and that of an unidentified primate. Their investigation reveals a lead to the whereabouts of the experiment which may just help put an end to the series of murders.
5	"The Bug That Crawls the Omotesando"; Transliteration: "Omotesandō o Hau Mushi" (Japanese: 表参道を這(は)う蟲(むし))	Masahiko Otsuka	42 Script Cell	August 3, 2008
During transport, a minor traffic accident alters the defense systems of an anti-terrorist security robot and causes it to malfunction and go berserk, killing several security guards. Superintendent Yakushiji and her subordinate, Assistant Inspector Izumida, are drawn to the situation which becomes complicated when Izumida's elementary school cousin, Mana, gets involved. In addition, the two police officers discover the presence of armed tactical teams of the Japan Private Police (JPP), a JACES rival and a known PMC-type security company, secretly deployed to neutralize the situation and conceal the evidence of robot's existence.
6	"Maid in Kasumigaseki"; Transliteration: "Meido in Kasumigaseki" (Japanese: メイドin霞ヶ関)	Naoki Murata	Hiroyuki Kawasaki	August 10, 2008
Superintendent Yakushiji, Izumida and her newly arrived maids; Marianne and Lucienne, investigate the appearance of a giant salamander within a secret gaming resort for corrupt politicians beneath the Greater Tokyo Area. They encounter gunmen hired to destroy the creature.
7	"Okinawa, Gods' Island"; Transliteration: "Okinawa, Kōnoshima" (Japanese: 沖縄、神の島)	Kiyotaka Itani	42 Script Cell	August 17, 2008
Superintendent Yakushiji and her subordinate, Assistant Inspector Izumida, head to Okinawa - where several environmentalists have gone missing - to investigate the reclusive JPP founder Ryojun Tadomura. Her rival and fellow Superintendent, Yukiko Muromachi, also arrives to carry out an assignment. They find that the JPP founder's villa has been brought under the control of a mutated species of mangrove trees, likely caused by genetic experiments that went out of control.
8	"Tamagawa Suicide"; Transliteration: "Tamagawa Sūsaido" (Japanese: 多摩川スーサイド)	Yasushi Murotani	Kenichi Kanemaki	August 24, 2008
The unusual circumstances surrounding the death of a former classmate, the most recent victim in a series of suicides which have already claimed the life of a well-known police forensics scientist, along with an unusual tip prompt Superintendent Yakushiji and her subordinate, Assistant Inspector Izumida, to launch an investigation by searching for clues in an acoustic lab. They come across a bitter university professor and a new species of ultrasound crickets.
9	"Queen of Shiba"; Transliteration: "Shiba no Joō" (Japanese: 芝の女王)	Hama Tsumamori	Hiroyuki Kawasaki	August 31, 2008
Superintendent Yakushiji receives an email from the Paris District Police Department and temporarily stops reporting to the office thereafter. Meanwhile, Assistant Inspector Izumida is invited by Superintendent Muromachi for a private discussion about an investigation she has been conducting, in a personal capacity, on Shiba and the mysterious woman who controls it from the shadows known simply as the Queen of Shiba. Weeks later, a bill regulating the practice of amakudari is voted upon and backed by a secret organization of renegade police officials led by the Queen of Shiba, a smear campaign is launched capitalizing on Yakushiji's notoriety in the Tokyo Metropolitan Police Department. Amidst the controversy and media attention, Yakushiji shows up and takes Izumida away to infiltrate a JPP stronghold in the Greater Tokyo Area where they discover the existence of a kid in her early teens who looks exactly like her.
10	"Trap in Azabu"; Transliteration: "Azabu no Wana" (Japanese: 麻布の罠(わな))	Tomoaki Ota	Hiroyuki Kawasaki	September 7, 2008
Superintendent Yakushiji and her subordinate, Assistant Inspector Izumida, take the child into their custody but find that the child has no idea of who she is. They then dub her later as Monami. Meanwhile, the Queen of Shiba destroys DK Pharmaceuticals along with other public buildings and reaffirm an alliance with the Defense Minister to further each other's ambitions. Yakushiji prepares to send Monami overseas to ensure that she is far from the clutches of the enemy. However, distraught over the nature of the plan, Monami runs away and is eventually captured by JPP operatives. She is then confined in an incubating apparatus.
11	"Takanawa Princess"; Transliteration: "Takanawa no Purinsesu" (Japanese: 高輪のプリンセス)	Mitsuru Nakasumu	Hiroyuki Kawasaki	September 14, 2008
Superintendent Muromachi, continues her surveillance on Shiba amidst the ongoing preparations for the anti-terrorist exercise covering the Greater Tokyo Area. Superintendent Yakushiji confronts her rival about the latter's surveillance activities on Shiba just as Muromachi was preparing to visit Assistant Inspector Izumida. Yakushiji then identifies the Queen of Shiba as Isurugi Ruriko and reveals her involvement with JACES and then JPP. Around that time, having escaped from captivity and already a young woman, Monami finds her way to Izumida's apartment before passing out. When Yakushiji and Muromachi arrive, it is decided that Monami and Izumida will stay with Yakushiji at her place. Yakushiji and Izumida holds a discussion on Shiba while Nonagase reveals Yakushiji's infatuation with Izumida to Monami. It is around this time that Nonagase is unmasked. Nonagase then takes Monami to see Isurugi Ruriko who informs her of the true purpose of her creation and existence.
12	"Tokyo Dead or Love (1st Part)"; Transliteration: "Tōkyō Deddo oa Rabu (Zenpen)" (Japanese: 東京デッド・オア・ラブ (前編))	Takenori Mihara	Hiroyuki Kawasaki	September 21, 2008
Monami leaves with Isurugi Ruriko upset after seeing Assistant Inspector Izumida shield his superior from a bomb blast. Later at Shiba, Isurugi Ruriko and other conspirators in the JGSDF and the JPP finalize their plans for the anti-terrorist exercise. Superintendent Yakushiji leaves the evacuation of her staff to her rival, Superintendent Muromachi, and makes the first move. Having regained consciousness, Assistant Inspector Izumida rushes over to Yakushiji who had by this time survived attacks from an AH-64 Apache and a Type 90 MBT. Yakushiji and Izumida are reunited at the harbor where they bravely face a Type 10.
13	"Tokyo Dead or Love (2nd Part)"; Transliteration: "Tōkyō Deddo oa Rabu (Kōhen)" (Japanese: 東京デッド・オア・ラブ (後編))	Taro Iwasaki	Hiroyuki Kawasaki	September 28, 2008
Superintendent Yakushiji and her subordinate, Assistant Inspector Izumida, head out to Shiba with the Type 10 under Marianne and Lucienne's control. Just as Yakushiji and Izumida are surrounded, a Type 81 SAM destroys Tokyo Tower severing the link to the JGSDF soldiers under mind-control. This time, it is Monami that Izumida shields from falling debris. Yakushiji destroys Isurugi Ruriko using a formula she had previously prepared but reveals that another clone will pick up where the failed Queen of Shiba left off. In the aftermath, just as the year was about to end, Yakushiji holds a press conference where, to everyone's utter dismay and terror, she declares her decision to continue her career as a law officer with more passion and conviction than before.
