= 7th Surface-to-Ship Missile Regiment =

- Active: 21 March 2024 - present
- Country: Japan
- Branch: Japan Ground Self-Defense Force
- Type: Missile unit
- Role: Coastal defence
- Size: 200 troops
- Part of: 2nd Artillery Brigade
- Garrison/HQ: Katsuren camp

The 7th Surface-to-Ship Missile Regiment is a missile unit of the Japan Ground Self-Defense Force. Established on 21 March 2024, it is garrisoned in Uruma and it is tasked with coastal defence duties.

The Regiment is equipped with Type 12 coastal defence anti-ship guided missiles.

== History ==
In September 2021, the Japanese Ministry of Defence deployed to Okinawa Island Type 12 anti-ship missile batteries, along with around 180 troops, in order to bolster the defence of the southwestern islands.

On 21 March 2024, after slightly increasing the troops, the deployment was established as an independent unit.

== Mission ==
The 7th Surface-to-Ship Missile Regiment is to play a central role in Japan's defence of the Okinawa Prefecture. The Regiment’s primary task is to perform surveillance of foreign military vessels in the waters between Okinawa and Miyako-jima. The unit is tasked with blocking a possible invasion of the remote islands from the sea and confronting invading forces.

The Regiment also takes on the role of supervising other missile units deployed on both Miyako-jima and Ishigaki-jima islands in Okinawa, as well as on Amami Ōshima island in Kagoshima Prefecture.

== See also ==
- Type 12 surface-to-ship missile
- Senkaku Islands dispute
