= Type 11 (missile) =

Type 11 Surface-to-Air Missile
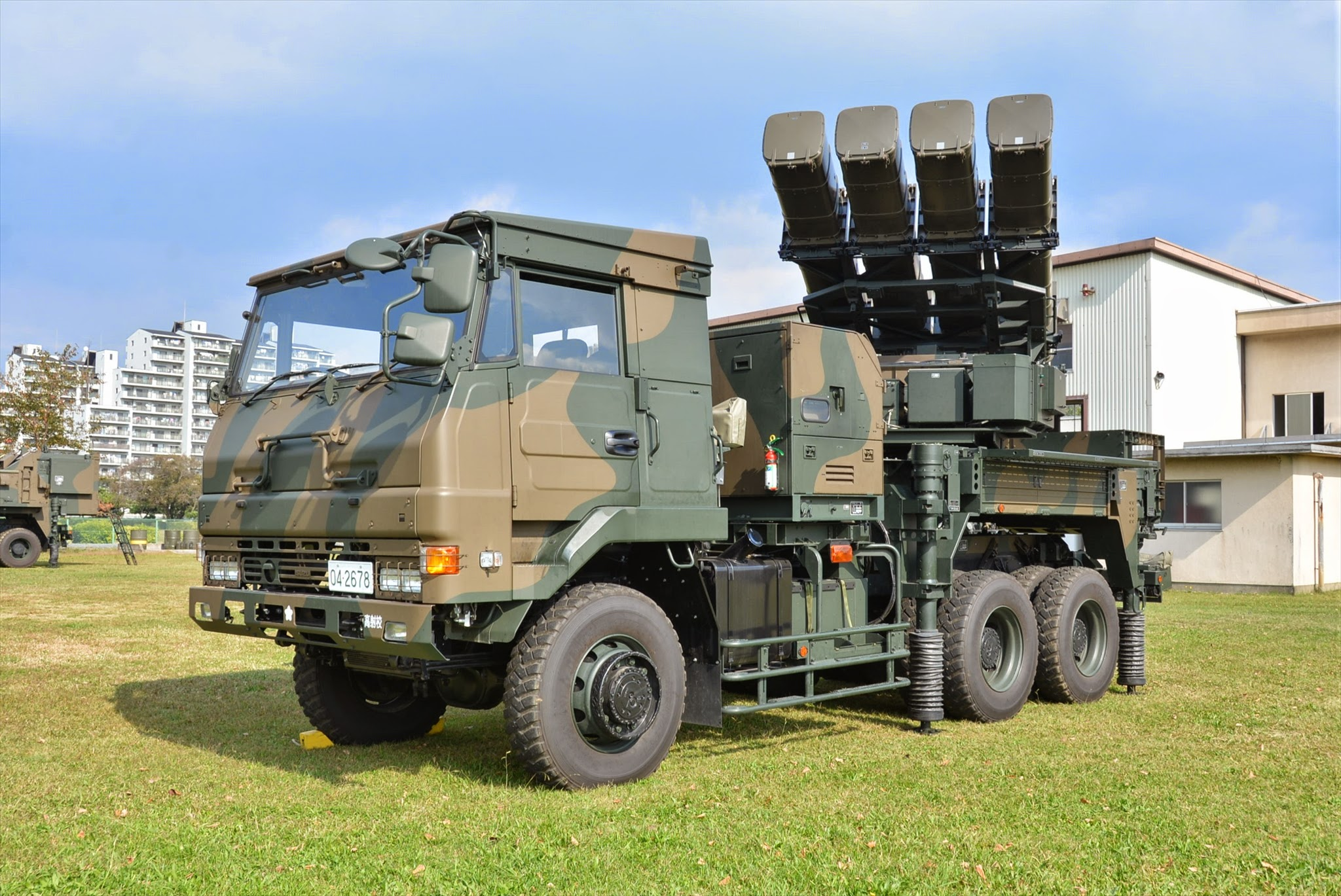
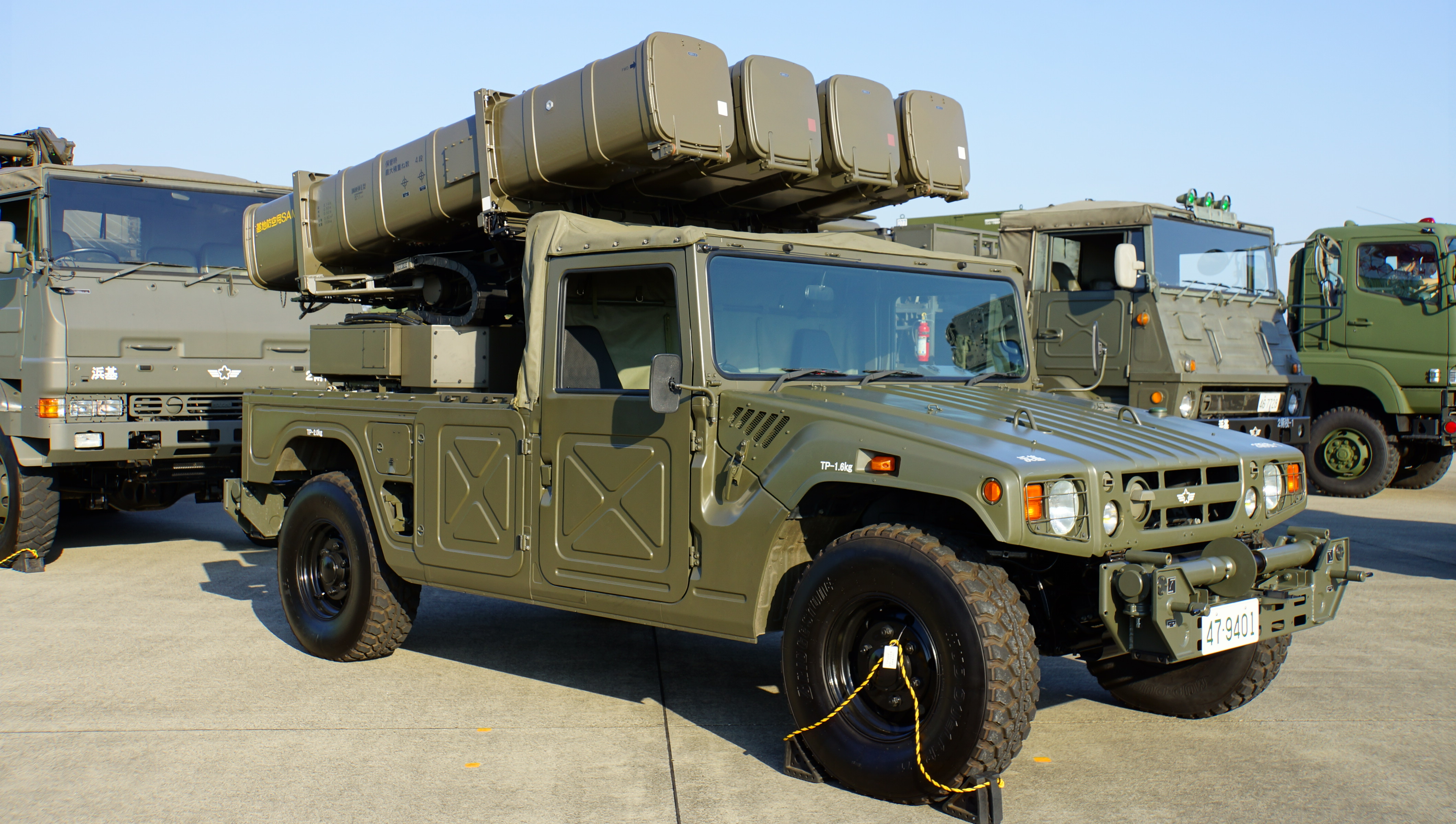
- Type 11 Surface-to-Air Missile JGSDF launcher and JASDF launcher
- Type: Mobile, short-range surface-to-air missile
- Place of origin: Japan

Service history
- In service: 2014–present
- Used by: Japan

Production history
- Designed: 2005
- Manufacturer: Toshiba
- Produced: 2011–present

Specifications
- Mass: 103 kg
- Length: 2.93 meters
- Diameter: 160 mm
- Warhead: HE-fragmentation
- Detonation mechanism: Contact and radar proximity
- Engine: Nissan Motor single-stage solid-fuel rocket motor
- Operational range: 10 km
- Guidance system: Kawasaki Heavy Industries inertial guidance with Toshiba passive infrared homing for terminal guidance
- Launch platform: Isuzu Motors 6×6 Type 73 armoured mobile truck or Toyota 4×4 Mega Cruiser BXD10

The Type 11 Surface-to-Air Missile (11式短距離地対空誘導弾) or Tan-SAM Kai II is a Japanese developed surface-to-air missile currently in service with the Japan Self-Defense Forces.

== Development ==
The system was developed by Toshiba as a further improvement of the Type 81 Surface-to-Air Missile. Development work on Tan-SAM Kai II started in 2005 and in 2014 Type 11 missile was officially unveiled.

== Deployment ==
The system is currently deployed by the Japan Ground Self-Defense Force and Japan Air Self-Defense Force.

The AESA radar and fire control system is carried on an Isuzu Type 73 6×6 truck. In JGSDF service the four-tube missile launcher is also carried on a separate Type 73 truck, while in JASDF service a Toyota Mega Cruiser 4×4 is used instead.
