= Type 81 surface-to-air missile =

Type 81 (Tan-SAM)
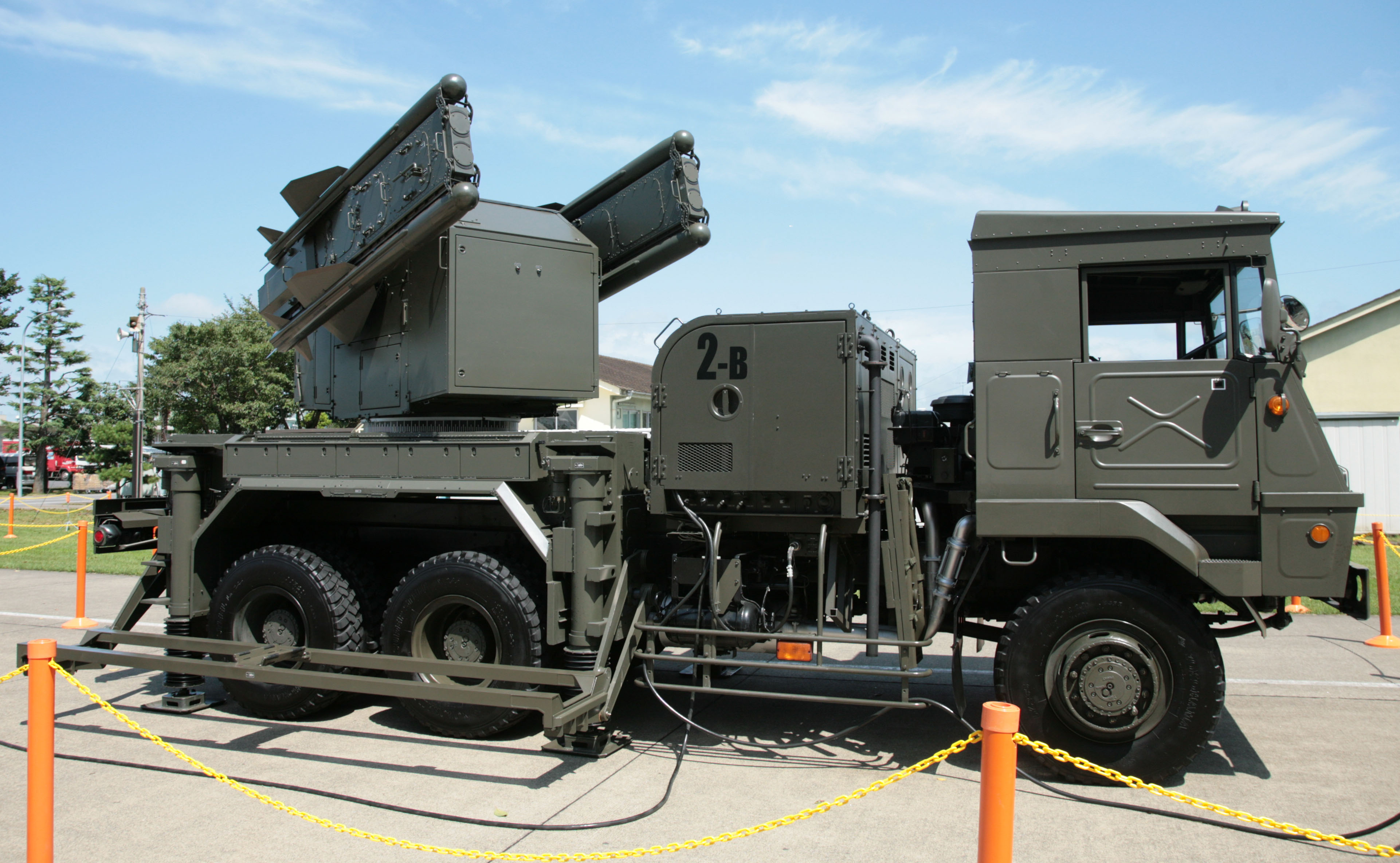
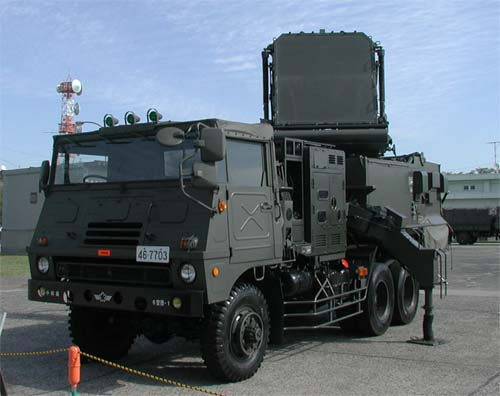
- JASDF launcher and fire control systems vehicles
- Type: Mobile, short-range surface-to-air missile
- Place of origin: Japan

Service history
- In service: 1981–present
- Used by: Japan

Production history
- Designed: 1966
- Manufacturer: Toshiba
- No. built: ~107

Specifications
- Mass: 100 kg
- Length: 2.7 meters
- Diameter: 160 mm
- Wingspan: 600 mm
- Warhead: 9.2 kg HE-fragmentation
- Detonation mechanism: Contact and radar proximity
- Engine: Nissan Motor single-stage solid-fuel rocket motor
- Operational range: 0.5 - 14 km
- Flight ceiling: 15 to 3,000 meters
- Maximum speed: Mach 2.9
- Guidance system: Kawasaki Heavy Industries inertial guidance with Toshiba passive infrared homing for terminal guidance
- Launch platform: Isuzu 6×6 Type 73 armoured mobile truck

The Type 81 surface-to-air missile (81式短距離地対空誘導弾) or Tan-SAM (短SAM) is a Japanese developed surface-to-air missile currently in service with the Japan Ground Self-Defense Force.

== Development ==
The system was developed by Toshiba as a replacement for the 75 mm M51 Skysweeper and M15A1 37 mm/12.7 mm anti-aircraft guns. Designed as a mobile short-range system to fill the performance gap between the FIM-92 Stinger man portable missile, and the larger MIM-23 Hawk missile system, which were both in service at the time. Development work began in 1966, with the first test firings conducted in 1978. The system was designated as the Type 81 by the JSDF, and contracts were placed for the system in 1980. The system entered service in 1981. In 1987, minor changed system SAM-1B was designated.

Development work on an upgrade designated Tan-SAM Kai started in 1989. Upgraded system was designated as SAM-1C in 1995, initial production on upgrade kits for the system starting in 1996. Two fire units were scheduled to be upgraded in 2000, with work on the program continuing into 2006.

Development work on an upgrade designated Tan-SAM Kai II started in 2005.

In 2014, the new type of short-range surface-to-air missile designated as Type 11 was officially unveiled, which as Tan-SAM Kai II research & development results, would replace the Type 81.

== Description ==
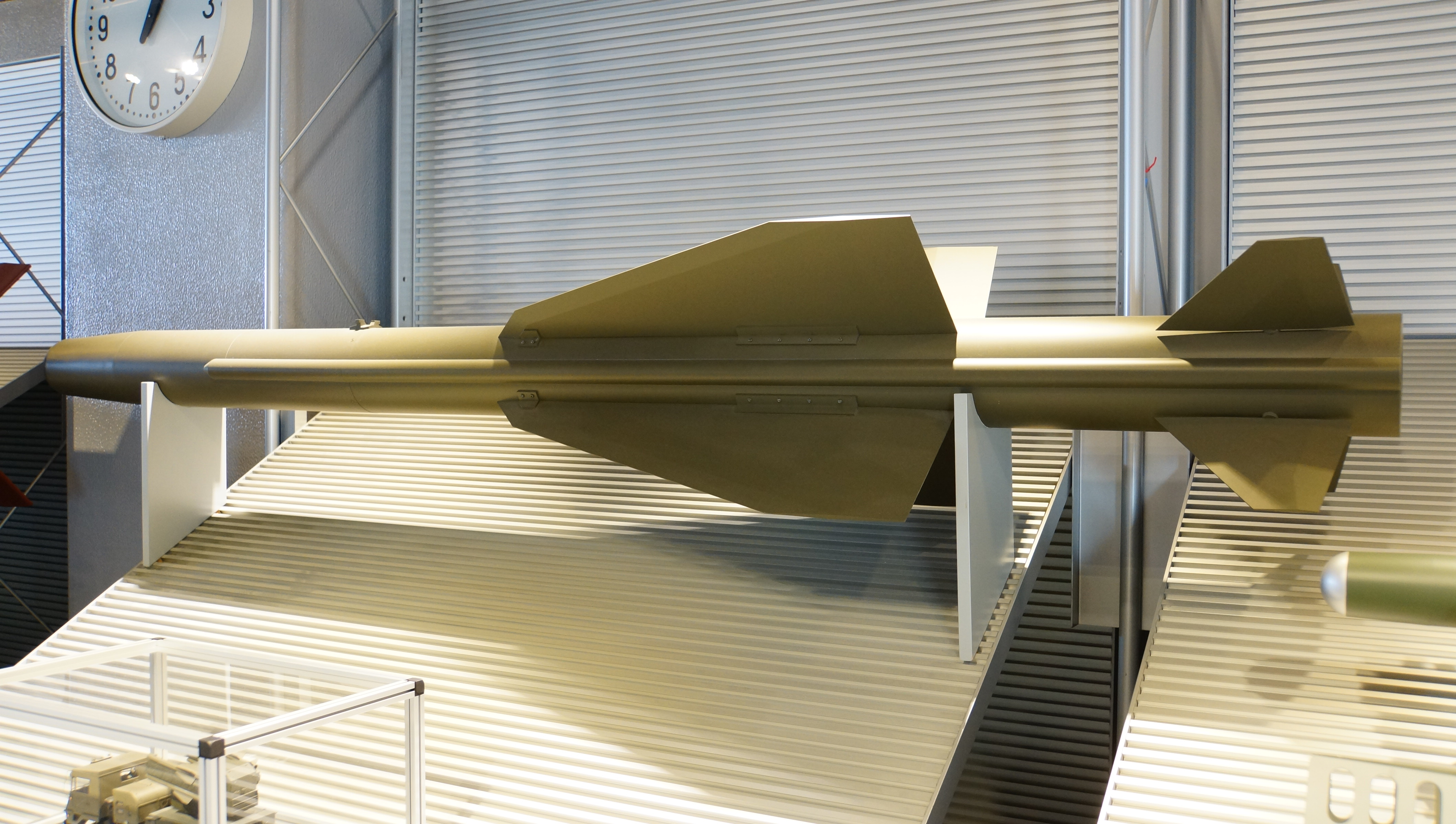
Tan-SAM 1 missile

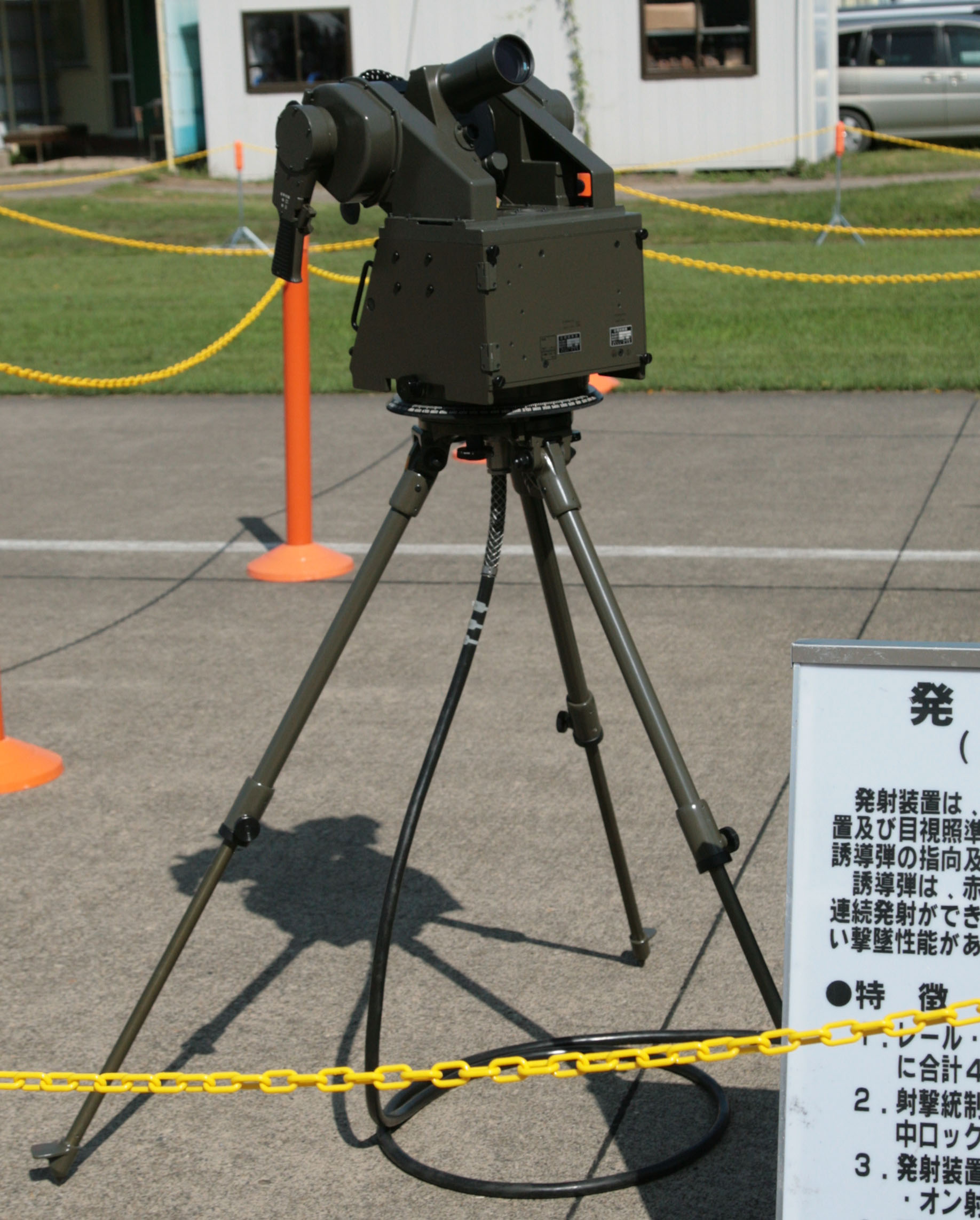
The tripod-mounted optical tracking unit

The Tan-SAM 1 missile is cruciform in cross section with four clipped delta wings attached to the mid body, and four small steerable clipped delta fins at the rear of the missile. The missile is propelled by a solid rocket motor, with giving it a burn-out velocity of about Mach 2.4. It is initially inertially guided to a likely intercept point, with an all-aspect infra-red seeker taking over to handle terminal guidance. The missile has a 9.2-kilogram fragmentation warhead triggered either by contact or a radar proximity fuze with a lethal radius of between 5 and 15 meters depending on the target type.

A fire unit consists of one Fire Control System vehicle and two launcher vehicles as well as a number of support vehicles with a total crew of fifteen men. The Fire Control Systems vehicle consists of an Isuzu 6×6 truck with a 30 kW generator unit mounted behind the driver's cabin, and a rectangular three-dimensional pulse-doppler phased array radar. The radar can operate in three modes: omni-directional search, sector search/course tracking mode, and fine tracking mode. The radar is scanned both mechanically and electronically and can track up to six targets within the same 110-degree arc in course tracking mode. Two targets can be tracked in fine tracking mode at greater accuracy, with the single-shot kill probability for each target relayed to the operator via a CRT display. The radar has a range of about 30 kilometers, and has built in IFF capabilities.

Information on the two selected targets is then passed to the two attached launcher units, which are also mounted on Isuzu Motors 6×6 trucks, which slew and elevate their launchers toward the target. The launchers can be deployed up to 300 meters away from the Fire Control System vehicle. An intercept course is computed for the missile, and the missile is launched. The missile follows the initial inertial course until it reaches a pre-programmed point where it activates its infrared seeker. The infrared seeker only scans a programmed area of the sky to prevent it from locking onto the sun. From that point it switches to passive infrared homing for the terminal phase of the flight.

The infrared seeker does not use IR filters to reject decoys, although there is a degree of protection provided by the use of intermediate frequency seeker scanning pattern.

Each launcher is equipped with an optical director that can be used instead of the radar in a high ECM environment or if the radar is not operational; additionally the vehicle can be mounted with one or two 12.7 mm calibre heavy machine guns, for self-defense in frontal forward areas against ground threats and close-in(<500 m) incoming air threats. The system can be set up in approximately 30 minutes, and the launcher reload time for all four missiles is around three minutes.

SAM-1C upgraded missile use a phased array active radar seeker, with the capability of receiving mid-course guidance updates from the Fire Control Systems vehicle. The upgrade also increases the missile's maximum range to 14 kilometers while increasing the missile weight to 105 kilograms. A new smokeless motor with improved thrust is also fitted, replacing the existing motor. Also the Fire Control Systems vehicle is fitted with a thermal imager to improve operation in an ECM heavy environment.

== Deployment ==
The system is currently deployed by the JGSDF, JASDF and JMSDF with 57 fire units serving with the ground force (out of an initial requirement for 76), 30 serving with the air force, and 6 serving with the maritime force.
