= Japan Ground Self-Defense Force =

Army branch of the Japanese armed forces

- 陸上自衛隊
- Emblem of the Japan Ground Self-Defense Force
- Founded: 1 July 1954; 72 years ago
- Country: Japan
- Type: Army
- Role: Land warfare
- Size: 150,700 active personnel (2023); 56,000 reserve personnel (2023)
- Part of: Japan Self-Defense Forces
- Garrison/HQ: Ichigaya, Shinjuku, Tokyo, Japan
- Colours: Red, White and Gold
- March: "Battōtai" (抜刀隊)
- Website: www.mod.go.jp/gsdf/

Commanders
- Commander-in-Chief: Prime Minister Sanae Takaichi
- Minister of Defense: Shinjirō Koizumi
- Chief of Staff, Joint Staff: General Hiroaki Uchikura
- Chief of Staff, Ground Self-Defense Force: General Masayoshi Arai

Insignia
- Flag

The Japan Ground Self-Defense Force (Japanese: 陸上自衛隊, Hepburn: Rikujō Jieitai), JGSDF (陸自, Rikuji), also referred to as the Japanese Army, is the land warfare branch of the Japan Self-Defense Forces. Created on July 1, 1954, it is the largest of the three service branches.

New military guidelines, announced in December 2010, direct the Self-Defense Forces away from their Cold War focus on the Soviet Union to a new focus on China, especially in respect of the dispute over the Senkaku Islands.

== History ==
=== 20th century ===
Soon after the end of the Pacific War in 1945 with Japan accepting the Potsdam Declaration, the Imperial Japanese Army and Imperial Japanese Navy were dismantled by the orders of Supreme Commander for the Allied Powers (SCAP). Both were replaced by the United States Armed Forces occupation force, which assumed responsibility for the external defense of Japan.

Douglas MacArthur insisted that Japan have no military that could be used to settle international disputes or even for its own self defense. Accordingly, during the development of the Japan Constitution in 1946, Article 9 was added stating "the Japanese people forever renounce war as a sovereign right of the nation and the threat or use of force as means of settling international disputes."

"In order to accomplish the aim of the preceding paragraph, land, sea, and air forces, as well as other war potential, will never be maintained. The right of belligerency of the state will not be recognized." It is believed that the Special Diet Session leader Hitoshi Ashida added the clause "In order to accomplish the aim of the preceding paragraph" in the middle of Article 9. The intent of this phrasing was to allow for the creation of military forces in Japan which would be for the defense of Japan, and not for settling international disputes. Then Prime Minister Shigeru Yoshida accepted this wording and was able to convince the US to allow Japan to operate "self defense" forces.

Under the terms of the Treaty of Mutual Cooperation and Security between the United States and Japan, United States forces stationed in Japan were to deal with external aggression against Japan while Japanese forces, both ground and maritime, would deal with internal threats and natural disasters. Only after the outbreak of the Korean War did MacArthur authorise Prime Minister Shigeru Yoshida to establish a 75,000 strong National Police Reserve. The next expansion came in 1952, when as a compromise in the face of U.S. calls to build up an army of 350,000, the National Police Reserve was re-titled the National Safety Force and expanded to 110,000.

In 1954, Prime Minister Yoshida impelled the Diet to accept the Defence Agency Establishment and the Self-Defence Force Laws, which explicitly authorized the forces to "defend Japan against direct and indirect aggression, and when necessary to maintain public order." On July 1, 1954, the National Security Board was reorganized as the Defense Agency, and the National Security Force was reorganized afterwards as the Japan Ground Self-Defense Force (Army), the Japan Maritime Self-Defense Force (Navy) and the Japan Air Self-Defense Force (Air Force), with General Keizō Hayashi appointed as the first Chairman of Joint Staff Council—professional head of the three branches. The enabling legislation for this was the 1954 Self-Defense Forces Act [Act No. 165 of 1954].

That year the actual strength of the Ground, Maritime and Air Self-Defence Forces reached 146,285, armed mainly with U.S. World War II vintage equipment. At least up until the 1970s, the Ground SDF was not built up to the point required to defeat an invasion attempt from the north – informed officials estimated that while ammunition provisions were officially said to be enough to last for two months, in actuality it would be used up in a week or less.

During the 1970s, the Japan Ground Self-Defense Force possessed a dubious ability to hold off a Soviet invasion of Hokkaido. Zbigniew Brzezinski observed in 1972 that it seemed optimized to fight "a Soviet invasion conducted on American patterns of a quarter of a century ago." Three years later in 1975, Osamu Kaihara, the former secretary of the National Defence Council, was reported in U.S. News & World Report that the SDF would have been totally ineffective in any Soviet attack, as the Ground SDF could only fight as an army for three to four days. While the force is now an efficient army of around 150,000, its apparent importance had, until recently, seemingly declined with the end of the Cold War, and attempts to reorient the forces as a whole to new post Cold War missions have been tangled in a series of internal political disputes.

=== 21st century ===
On March 27, 2004, the Japan Defense Agency activated the Special Operations Group with the mandate under the JGSDF as its Counter-terrorist unit.

In 2015, the Japanese Diet passed a law that allowed for the reinterpretation of Article 9 of the constitution. JSDF personnel train with the American forces in amphibious assault units designed to take outlying islands.

Japan activated its first marine unit since World War II on April 7, 2018. The marines of the Amphibious Rapid Deployment Brigade are trained to counter invaders from occupying Japanese islands along the edge of the East China Sea.

British troops of the Honourable Artillery Company (HAC) exercised together for the first time with Japanese GSDF soldiers in Oyama, Shizuoka prefecture on 2 October 2018. The purpose was to improve their strategic partnership and security cooperation. Speaking about tensions regarding North Korea, Lieutenant General Patrick Sanders said that Japan "won't have to fight alone."

The JGSDF and the Indian Army conducted their first joint military exercise in the Indian state of Mizoram from 27 October to 18 November 2018. It primarily consisted of anti-terror drills and improving bilateral cooperation with 60 Japanese and Indian officers.

In March 2019, the Ministry of Defense established its first regional cyber protection unit in the Western Army of the Japan Ground Self-Defense Force (JGSDF) to safeguard defense communications from cyber attacks, such as for personnel deployed on remote islands with no established secure lines.

The Japanese government approved the first ever JSDF dispatch to a peacekeeping operation that is not led by the United Nations in 2019. JGSDF officers monitored the cease-fire between Israel and Egypt at the Multinational Force and Observers command in the Sinai Peninsula from 19 April until 30 November 2019.

From September to the end of November 2021, the GSDF conducted nationwide drills with all units including 100,000 personnel, 20,000 vehicles, 120 aircraft and the JMSDF and JASDF as well as a U.S. Army landing ship. These were the largest GSDF exercises since after the Cold War in 1993. The exercises are based on 2019 National Defense Program Guidelines to strengthen defense capabilities. Minister of Defense Nobuo Kishi said it is to effectively respond to various situations.

== Current deployment ==
=== Personnel ===
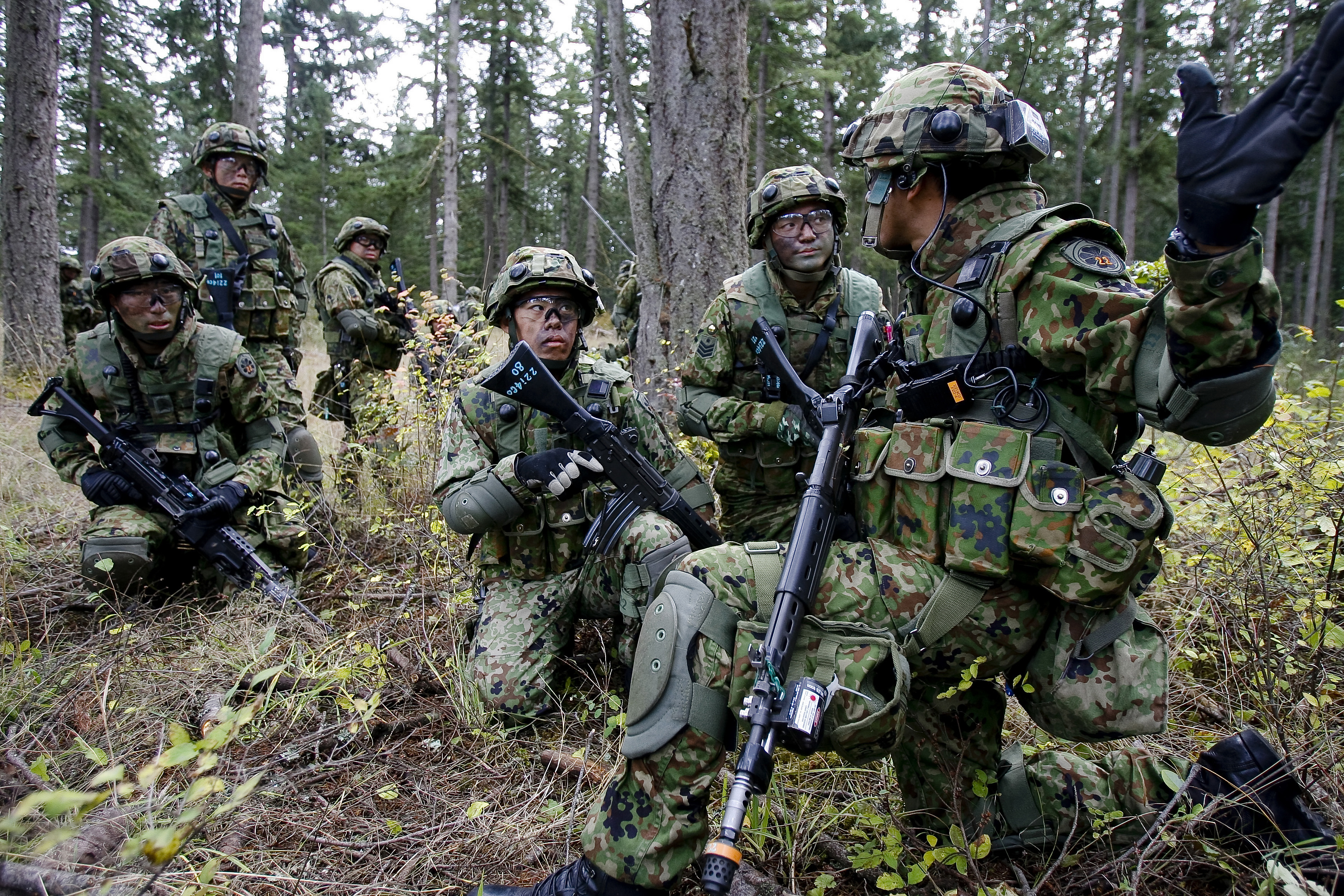
JGSDF soldiers from the 22nd Infantry Regiment train with U.S. Army soldiers in a bilateral exercise at Fort Lewis' Leschi Town in October 2008.

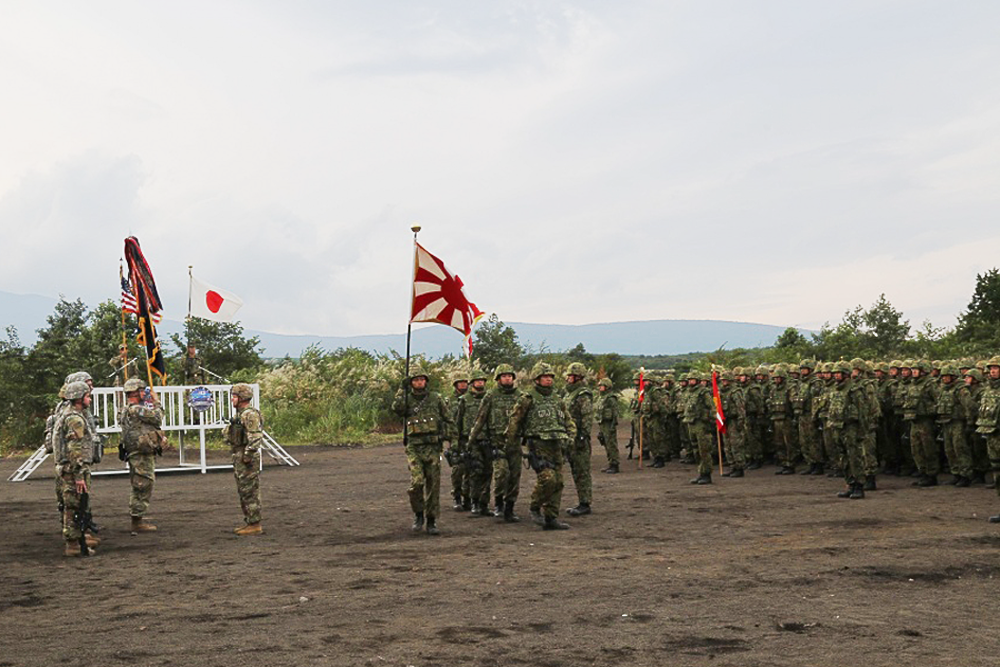
JGSDF soldiers and U.S. soldiers participate in the Orient Shield 2017 opening ceremony at Camp Shin Yokotsuka, Sept. 11, 2017.

In 1989, basic training for lower-secondary and upper-secondary academy graduates began in the training brigade and lasted approximately three months. Specialized enlisted and non-commissioned officer (NCO) candidate courses were available in branch schools, and qualified NCOs could enter an eight-to-twelve-week officer candidate program. Senior NCOs and graduates of an eighty-week NCO pilot course were eligible to enter officer candidate schools, as were graduates of the National Defense Academy at Yokosuka and graduates of all four-year universities. Advanced technical, flight, medical and command and staff officer courses were also run by the JGSDF. Like the maritime and air forces, the JGSDF ran a youth cadet program offering technical training to lower-secondary school graduates below military age in return for a promise of enlistment.

Because of population density and urbanization on the Japanese islands, only limited areas are available for large-scale training, and, even in these areas, noise restrictions are extensive. The JGSDF has adapted to these conditions by conducting command post exercises, map manoeuvres, investing in simulators and other training programs, as well as conducting live fire exercises overseas at locations such as the Yakima Training Center in the United States.

The JGSDF has two reserve components: the rapid-reaction reserve component (即応予備自衛官制度) and the main reserve component (一般予備自衛官制度). Members of the rapid-reaction component train 30 days a year. Members of the main reserve train five days a year. As of December 2007, there were 8,425 members of the rapid-reaction reserve component and 22,404 members of the main reserve component.

== Equipment ==
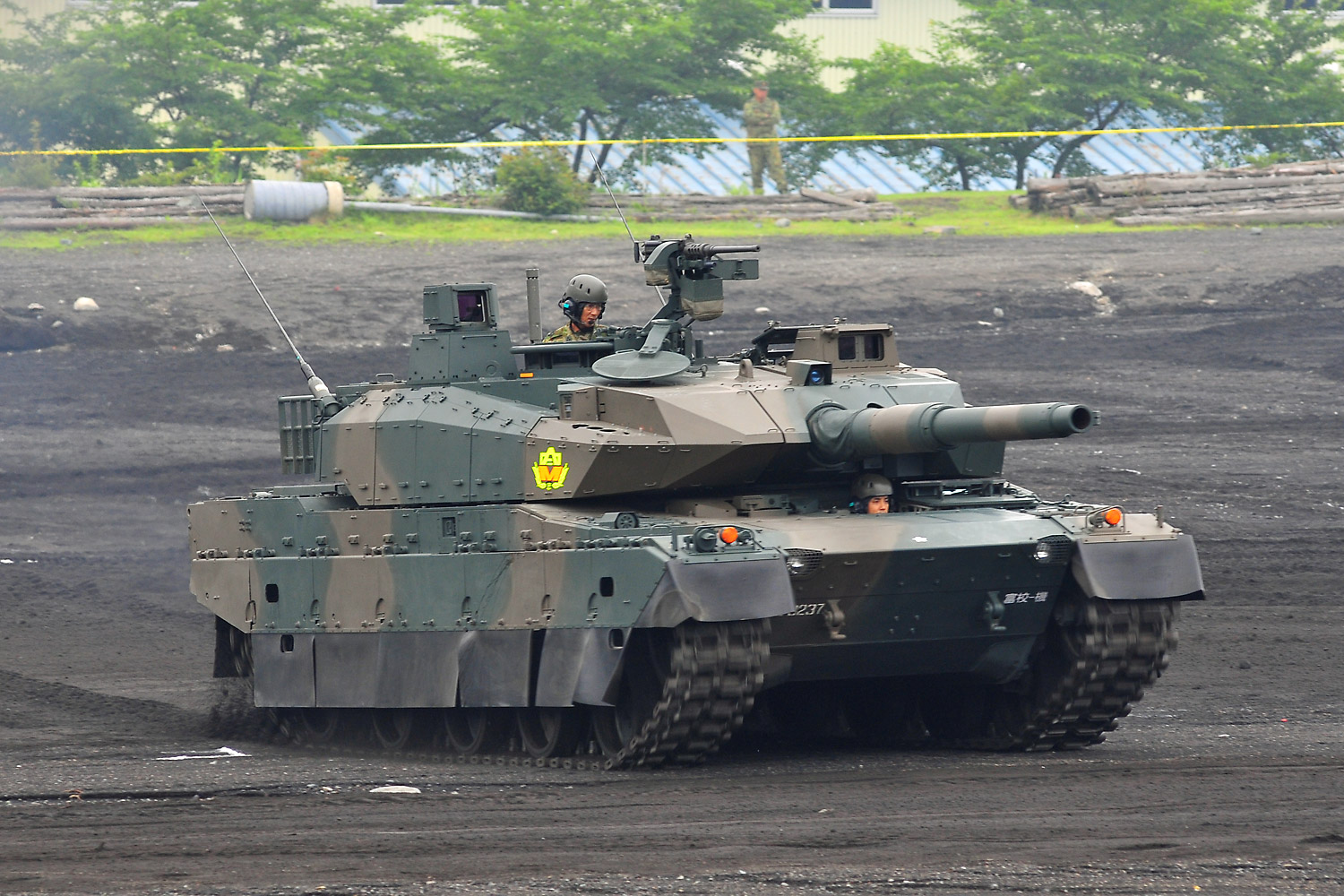
Type 10 main battle tank

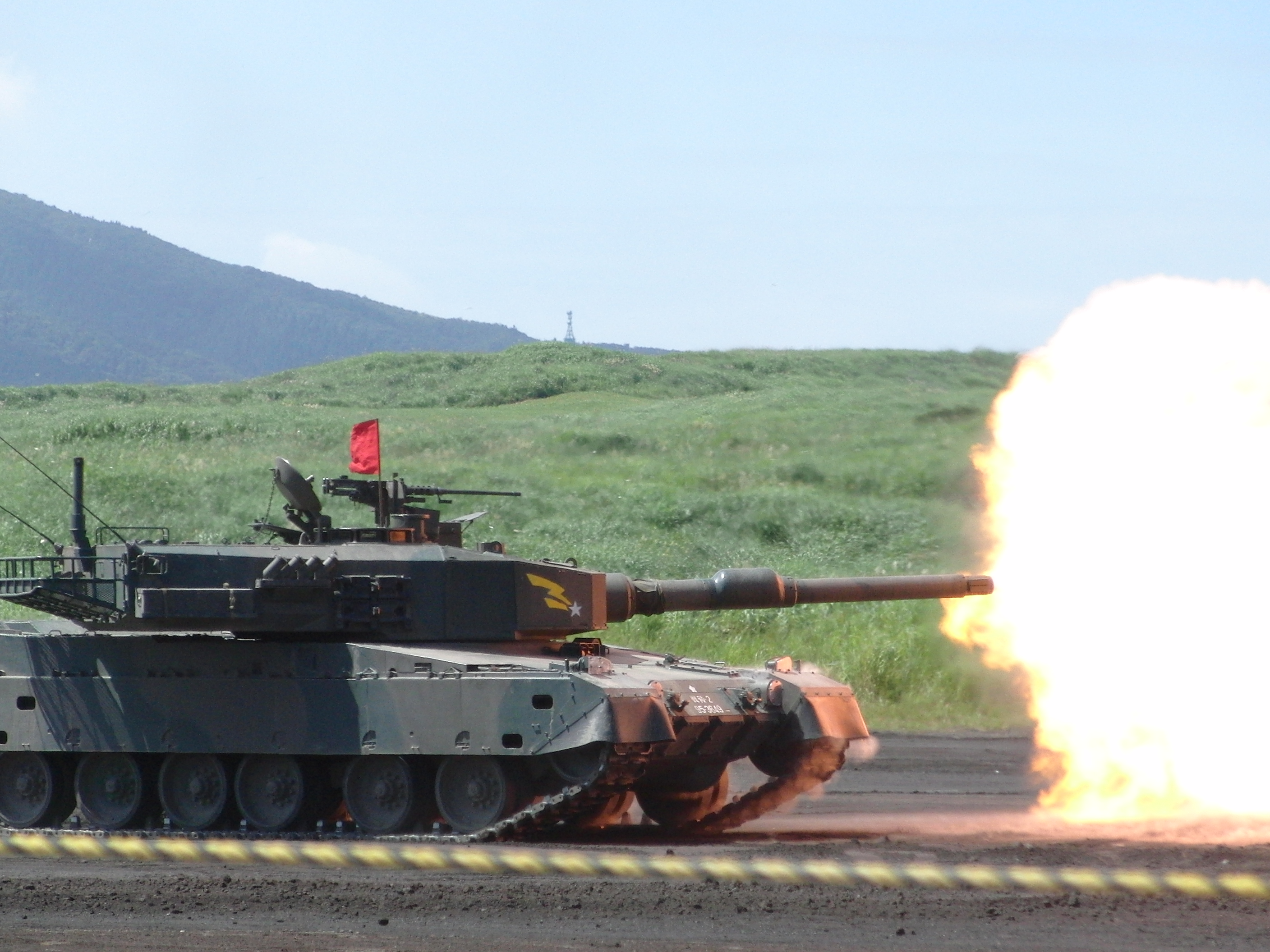
Type 90 main battle tank

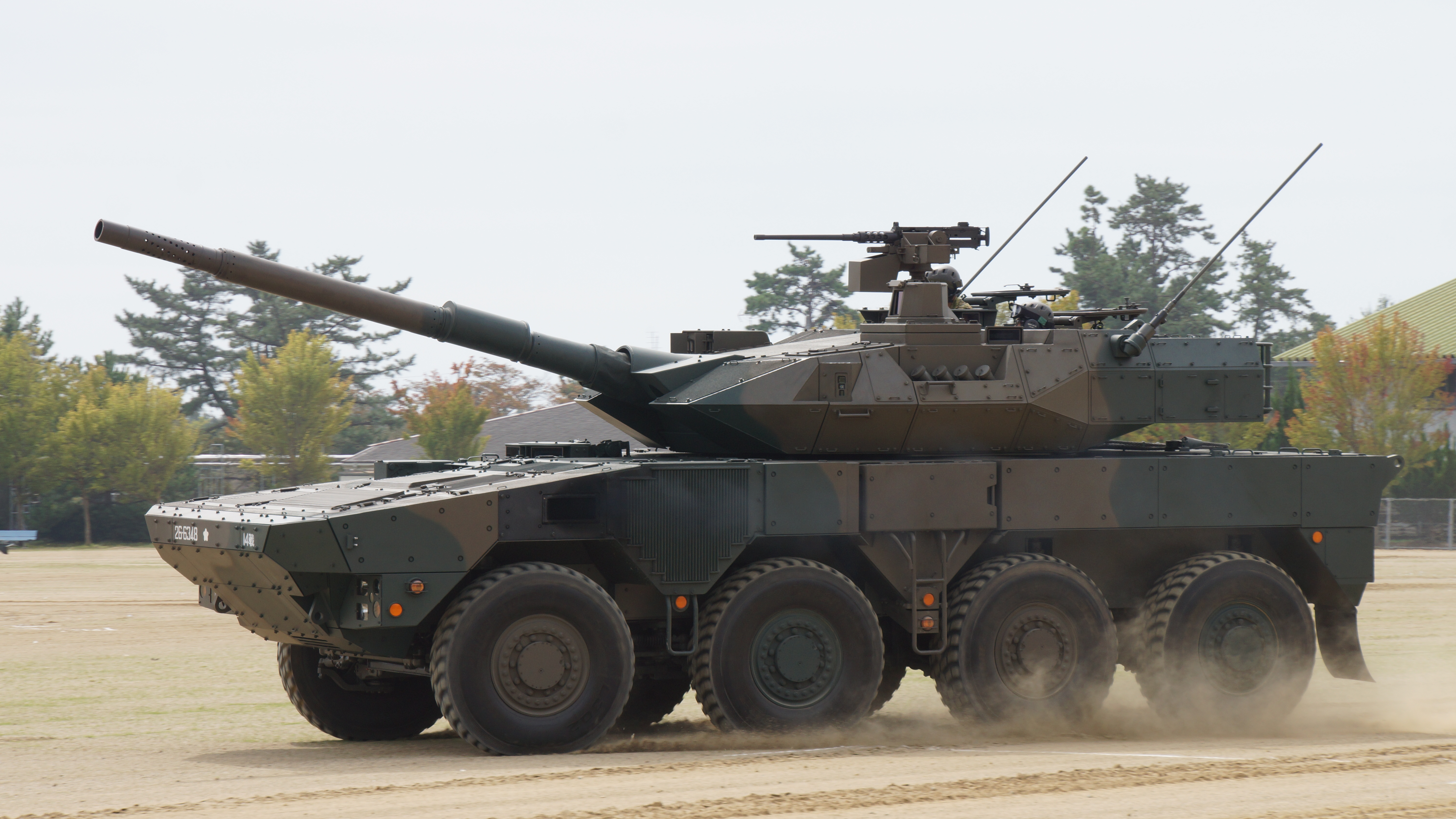
Type 16 maneuver combat vehicle

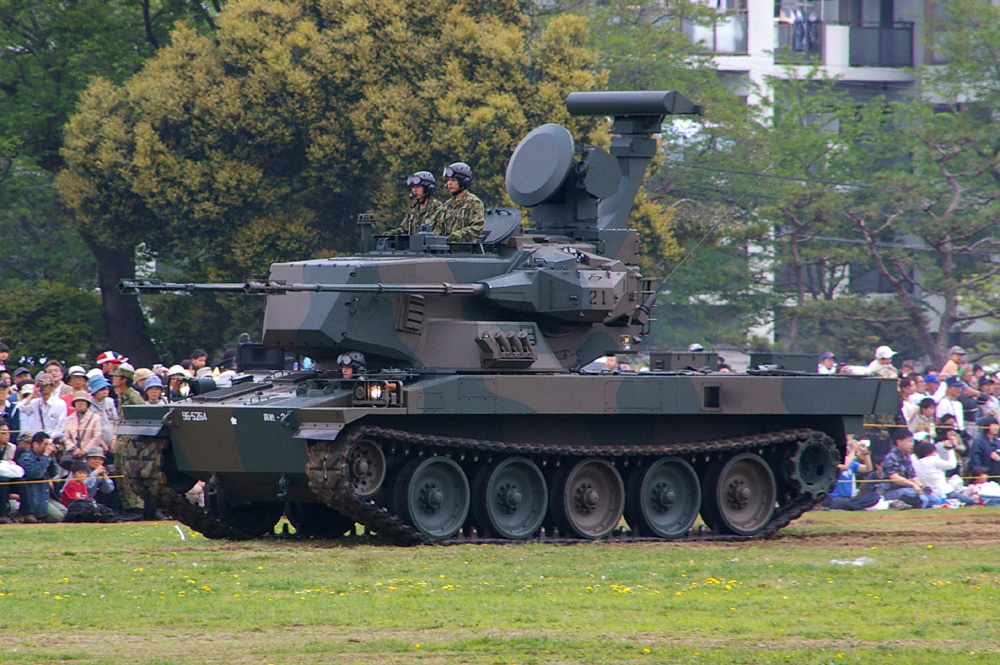
Type 87 self-propelled anti-aircraft gun

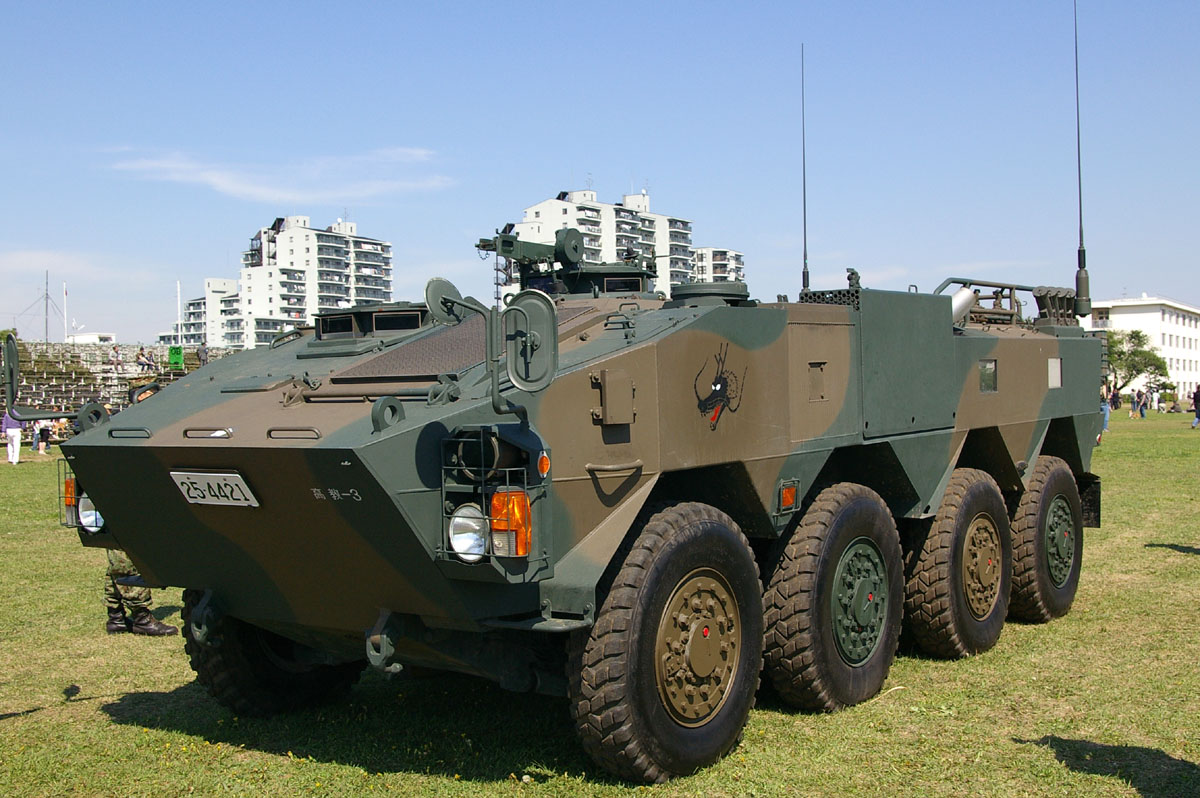
Type 96 armored personnel carrier

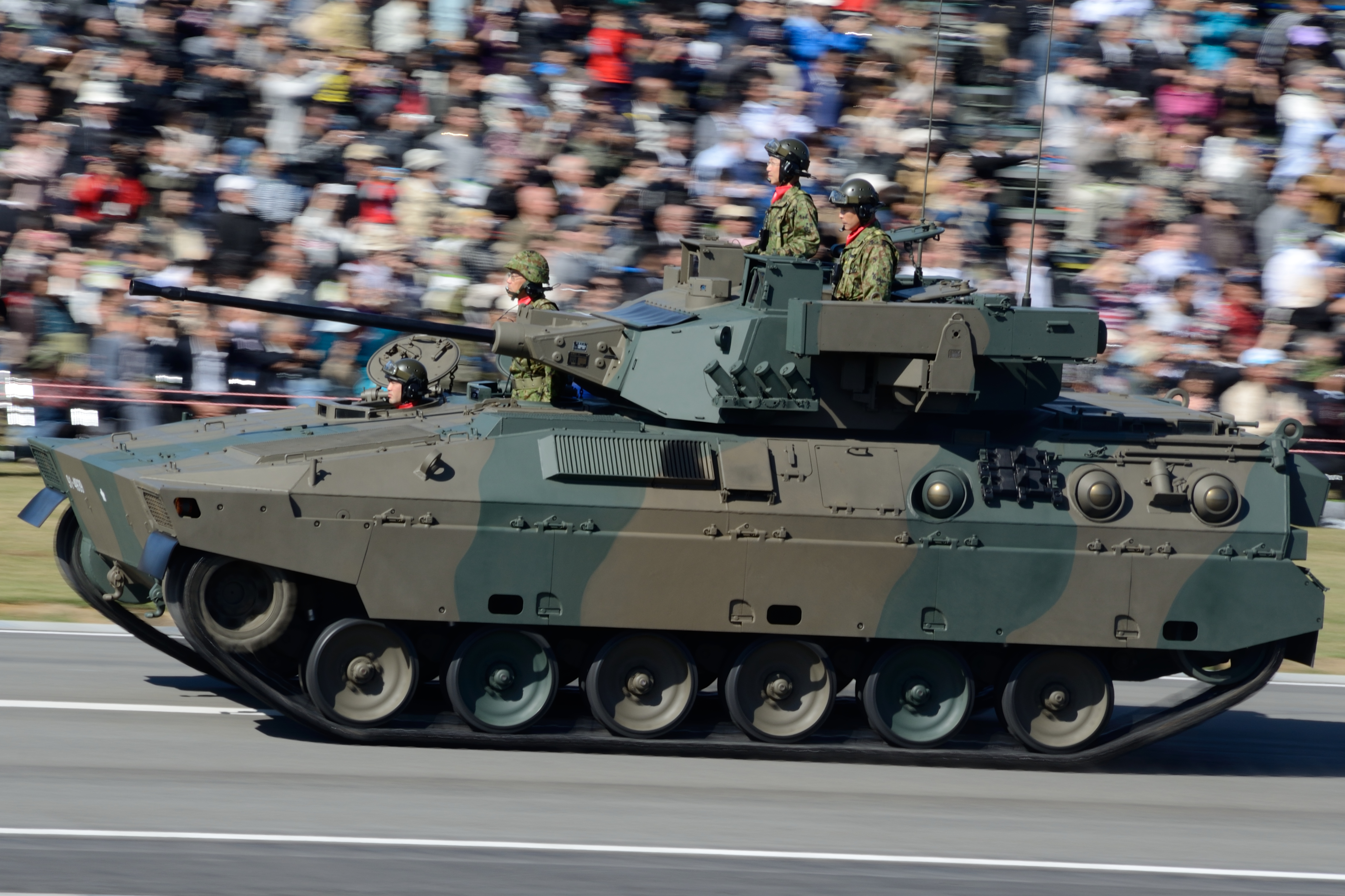
Type 89 infantry fighting vehicle

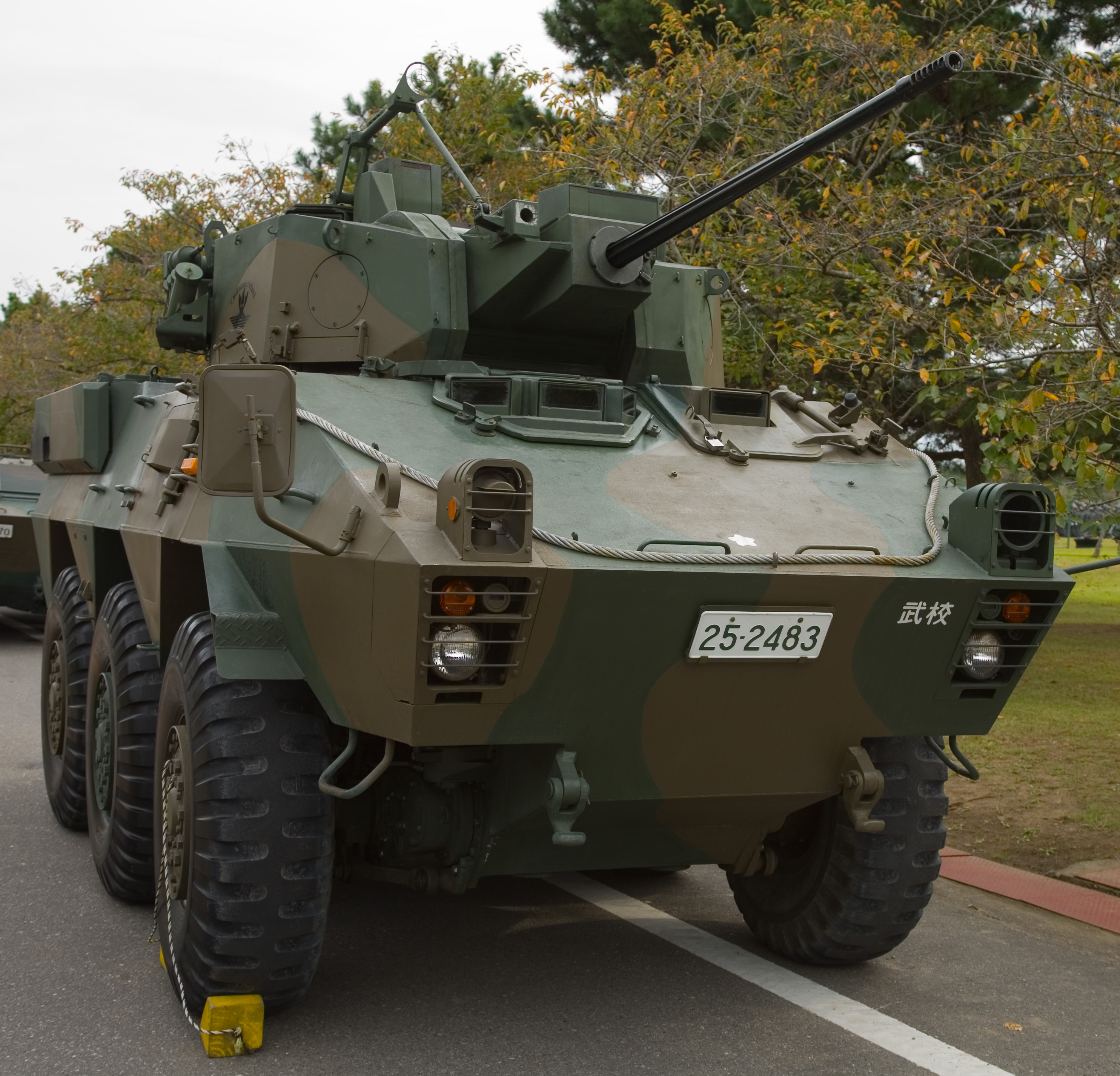
Type 87 armoured recon and patrol vehicle

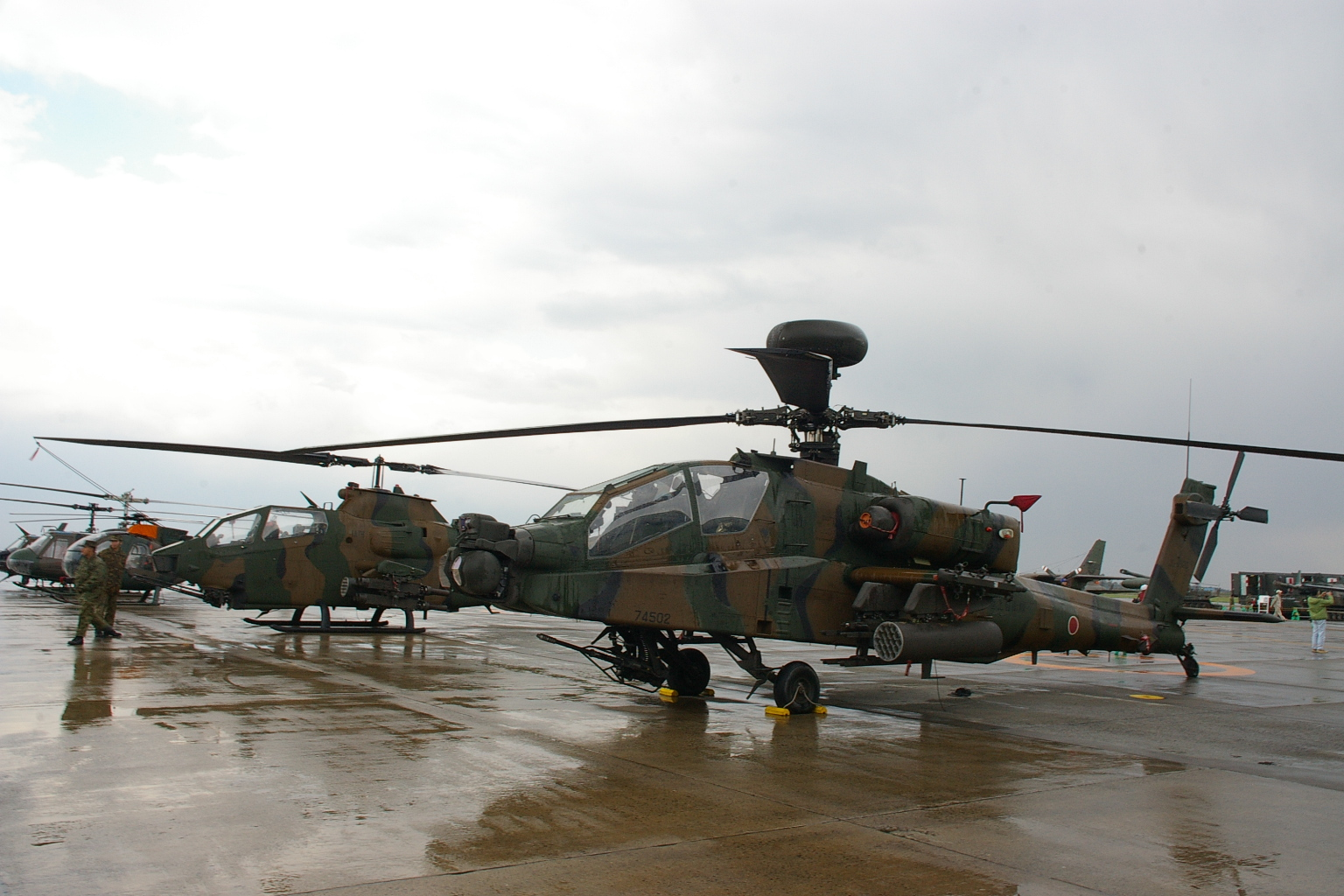
JGSDF AH-64D & AH-1S

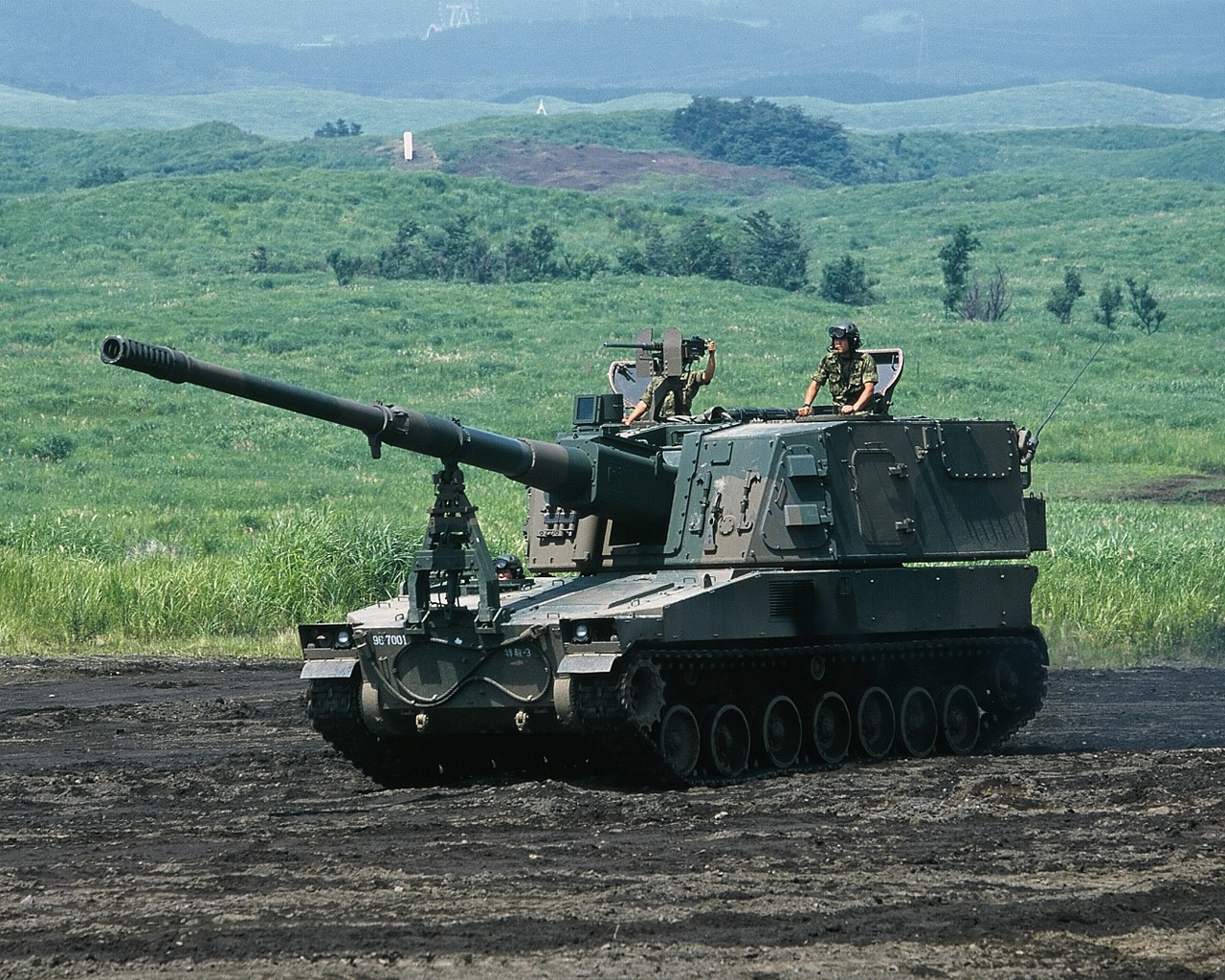
Type 99 155 mm self-propelled howitzer

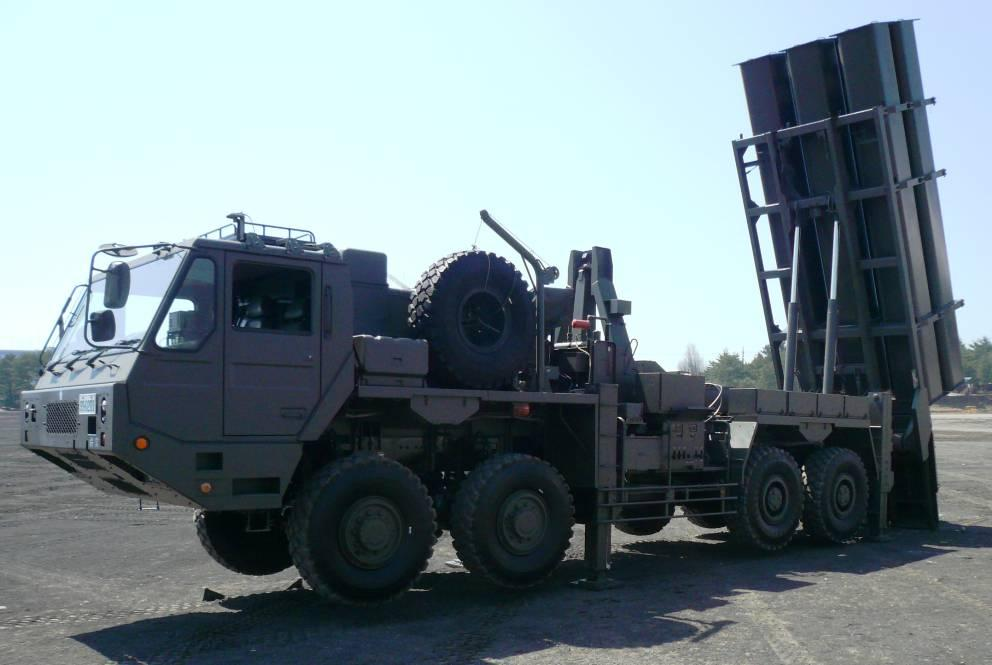
Type 12 surface-to-ship missile

== Organization ==
=== Major Commands ===
- Ground Component Command (陸上総隊, Rikujō Sōtai) is headquartered in Nerima, Tokyo. It was reorganized from the Central Readiness Force on March 27, 2018. In wartime, it would take command of two to five district armies.
- Central Rapid Deployment Regiment, headquartered in Utsunomiya, Tochigi. The regiment is a rapid deployment force under the command of the GCC for deployment both in Japan and abroad.
- Special Operations Group (will merge with the Central Rapid Deployment Regiment into a new elite formation in 2026)
- Japan Ground Self-Defense Force Materiel Command (陸上自衛隊補給本部, Rikujōjieitai Hokyūhonbu) — activated on 23 March 2026, from the Japan Ground Self-Defense Force Materiel Control Command. This organization will serve as the central hub for logistics within the Japan Ground Self-Defense Force. Regional depots, previously under the control of the district armies, were placed under its command.

Other units under direct control of the Japan Ground Self-Defense Force

- Signal Systems Brigade
- Military Intelligence Command
- Electronic Warfare Battalion
- Information Operations Battalion
- Central NBC-defense Battalion
- NBC Countermeasure Medical Unit
- International Activities Training Unit

=== District Armies ===
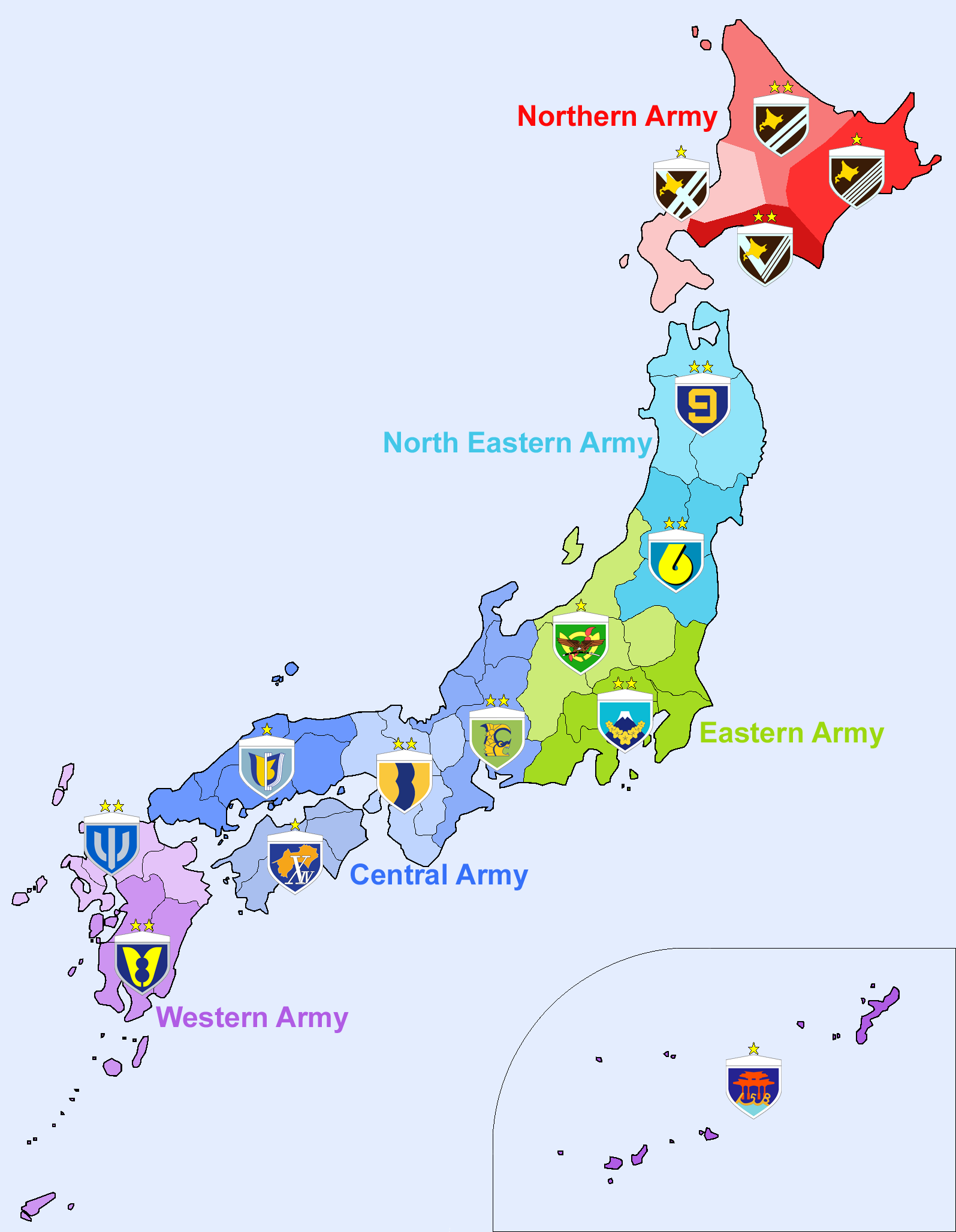
Disposition of JGSDF armies

Sources:

- Northern Army, headquartered in Sapporo, Hokkaido
- North Eastern Army, headquartered in Sendai, Miyagi
- Eastern Army, headquartered in Nerima, Tokyo
- Central Army, headquartered in Itami, Hyōgo
- Western Army, headquartered at Kumamoto, Kumamoto

=== Division ===
JGSDF currently has 9 active duty divisions (1 armored, 8 infantry)

- 1st Division,at Camp Nerima, in Nerima, Tokyo.
- 2nd Division,at Camp Asahikawa, in Asahikawa, Hokkaidō.
- 3rd Division, in Itami.
- 4th Division, in Kasuga.
- 6th Division, in Higashine.
- 7th Division (Armored),at Camp Higashi Chitose, in Chitose.
- 8th Division, in Kumamoto.
- 9th Division, in Aomori.
- 10th Division, in Nagoya.

=== Brigade ===
The JGSDF currently has eight combat brigades:

- 1st Airborne Brigade, at Camp Narashino in Funabashi, Chiba Prefecture
- 5th Brigade, at Camp Obihiro in Obihiro, responsible for the defense of North Eastern Hokkaidō
- 11th Brigade, at Camp Makomanai in Sapporo, responsible for the defense of South Western Hokkaidō
- 12th Brigade (Air Assault), at Camp Soumagahara in Shintō, responsible for the defense of Gunma, Nagano, Niigata and Tochigi prefectures.
- 13th Brigade, in Kaita, responsible for the defense of the Chūgoku region.
- 14th Brigade, in Zentsūji, responsible for the defense of Shikoku.
- 15th Brigade, in Naha, responsible for the defense of Okinawa Prefecture
- Amphibious Rapid Deployment Brigade, at Camp Ainoura in Sasebo, Nagasaki; amphibious force equipped to deploy from ships, where needed.

JGSDF divisions and brigades are combined arms units with infantry, armored, and artillery units, combat support units and logistical support units. They are regionally independent and permanent entities. The divisions' strength varies from 6,000 to 9,000 personnel. The brigades are smaller with 3,000 to 4,000 personnel.

The JGSDF currently has ten combat support brigades:

- 1st Artillery Brigade, at Camp Kita Chitose in Chitose, Hokkaido Prefecture
- 2nd Artillery Brigade, at Camp Yufuin in Yufu, Ōita Prefecture
- 1st Helicopter Brigade, at Camp Kisarazu in Kisarazu, Chiba Prefecture
- 1st Anti-Aircraft Artillery Brigade, at Camp Higashi in Chitose, Hokkaido Prefecture
- 2nd Anti-Aircraft Artillery Brigade, at Camp Iizuka in Iizuka, Fukuoka Prefecture
- 1st Engineer Brigade, at Camp Koga in Koga, Ibaraki Prefecture
- 2nd Engineer Brigade, at Camp Funaoka in Shibata, Miyagi Prefecture
- 3rd Engineer Brigade, at Camp Eniwa in Eniwa, Hokkaidō Prefecture
- 4th Engineer Brigade, at Camp Okubo in Uji, Kyoto Prefecture
- 5th Engineer Brigade, at Camp Ogōri in Ogōri, Fukuoka Prefecture

=== Other units ===
- Other Ground Self-Defense Forces units and organizations
  - Military Police (under the Ministry of Defense)
  - Ground Officer Candidate School
  - Training-Evaluation, Education, Research & Development Command (created in 2018 by integrating the former Ground Research & Development Command and JGSDF Staff College)

=== Japan Ground Self-Defense Force organization graphic ===
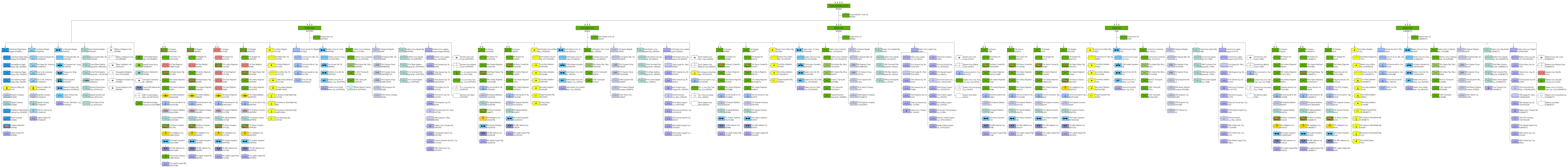
Japan Ground Self-Defense Force organization as of March 2026 (click image to enlarge)

Japan Ground Self-Defense Force organization as of March 2026 (click image to enlarge)

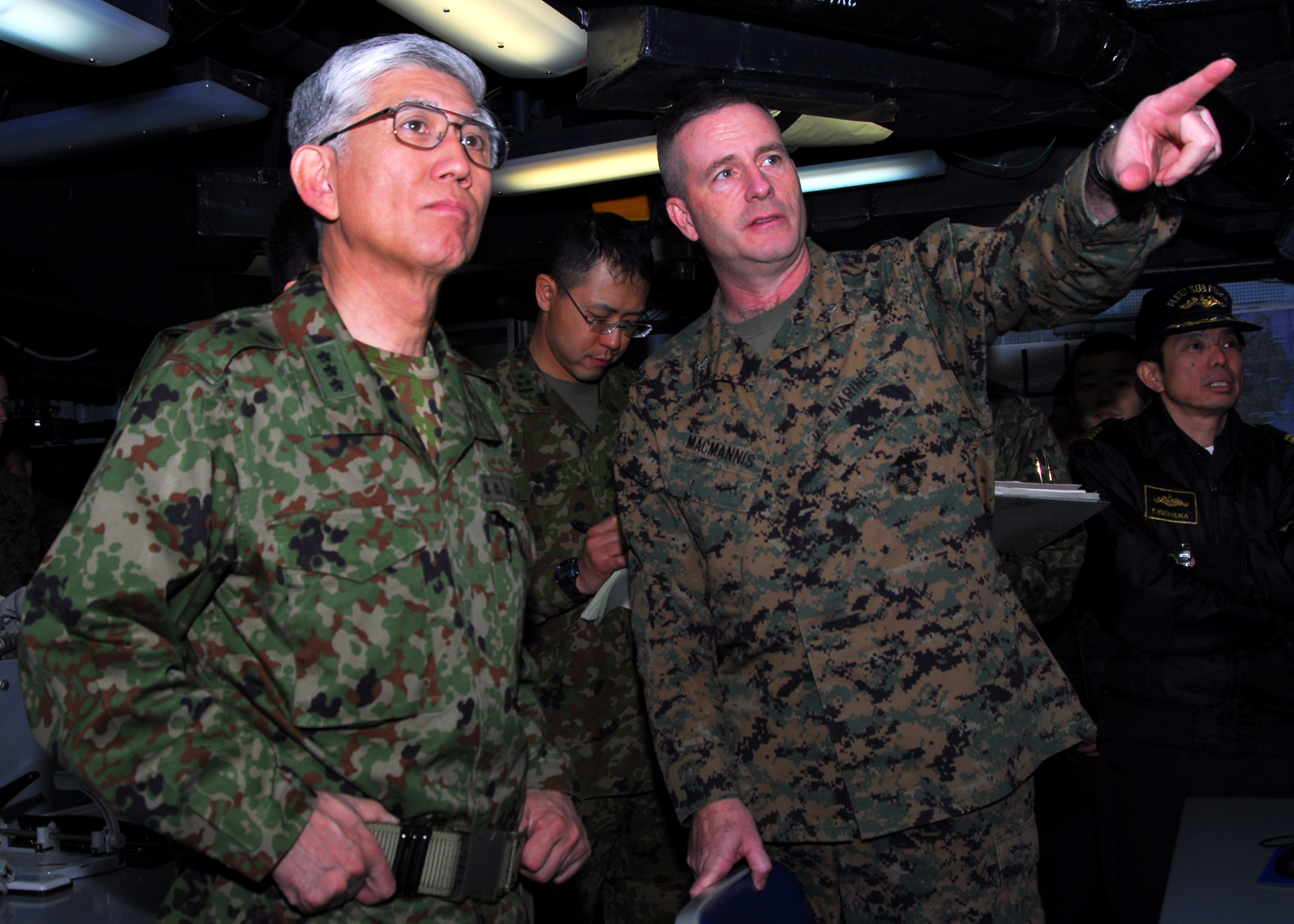
JGSDF Chief of Staff Eiji Kimizuka speaks with a U.S. Marine officer aboard the USS Essex (LHD-2) in March 2011.

== Ranks ==
=== Commissioned officer ranks ===
The rank insignia of commissioned officers.

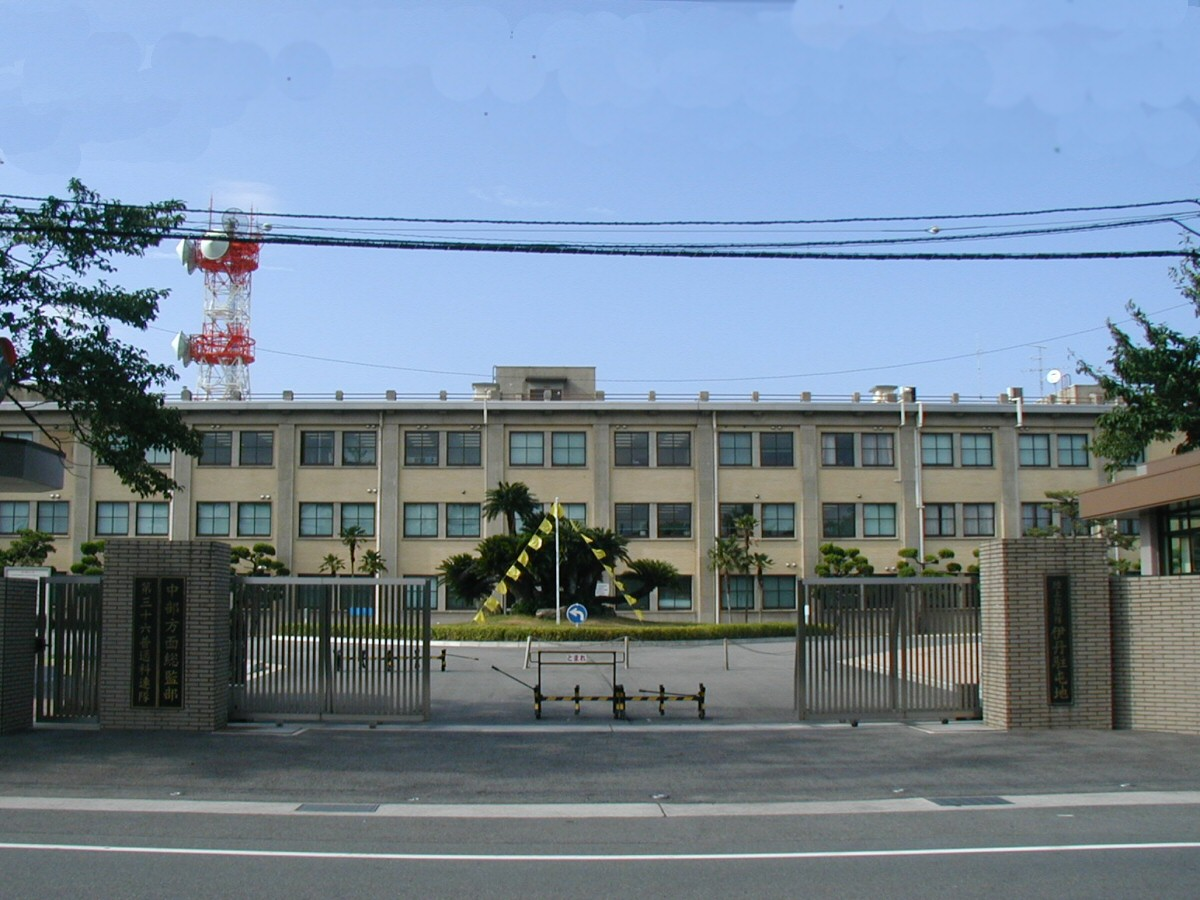
JGSDF Central Army headquarters in Itami, Japan

Rank group	General / flag officers			Senior officers			Junior officers
Japan Ground Self-Defense Force
Japan Ground Self-Defense Force	幕僚長および統合作戦司令官たる陸将; Bakuryōchō-oyobi-Tōgōsakusenshireikan-taru-rikushō	陸将; Rikushō	陸将補; Rikushō-ho	1等陸佐; Ittō rikusa	2等陸佐; Nitō rikusa	3等陸佐; Santō rikusa	1等陸尉; Ittō rikui	2等陸尉; Nitō rikui	3等陸尉; Santō rikui	准陸尉; Jun rikui

=== Other ranks ===
The rank insignia of non-commissioned officers and enlisted personnel.

Rank group	Senior NCOs				Junior NCOs		Enlisted
Japan Ground Self-Defense Force
Japan Ground Self-Defense Force	陸曹長; Rikusōchō	1等陸曹; Ittō rikusō	2等陸曹; Nitō rikusō	3等陸曹; Santō rikusō	陸士長; Rikushichō	1等陸士; Ittō rikushi	2等陸士; Nitō rikushi	自衛官候補生; Jieikan kōhosei

== Culture and traditions ==
=== Music and traditions ===
Although the JGSDF has fewer direct connections to its predecessor than the Japan Maritime Self-Defense Force (JMSDF), it still inherited many traditions from the former Imperial Japanese Army—largely because many retired Imperial Army officers joined the force shortly after World War II.

For instance, the military march "Battotai" (抜刀隊, Drawn-Sword Regiment) is officially used by both the former Imperial Army and the JGSDF as the “Japanese Army March.” Kaikosha, originally established as a social organization for retired Imperial Army officers, now also welcomes officers from both the JGSDF and the Japan Air Self-Defense Force (JASDF).

Several current JGSDF units, such as the 1st, 5th, 27th, 33rd, 34rd, and 37th Infantry Regiments as well as the 11th Tank Unit, describe themselves as successors to Imperial Army units that were once stationed in the same regions. These units not only inherit the names of their predecessors but also retain their emblems. Likewise, the 1st Airborne Brigade claims to be the successor to the former 1st Raiding Brigade, and it has inherited the military song "Sora no Shinpei" (空の神兵, Divine Soldiers of the Sky) as part of its tradition.

In addition, the JGSDF Officer Candidate School in Kurume claims historical and cultural continuity with the First Imperial Japanese Army Reserve Officers’ Cadet School, which was located on the same site until 1945.

=== Flag and insignia ===
The Imperial Japanese Army flag with symmetrical 16 rays and a 2:3 ratio was abolished in 1945. The Japan Self-Defense Forces (JSDF) and Japan Ground Self-Defense Force (JGSDF) use a significantly different variation of the Rising Sun Flag with red, white and gold colors. It has 8-rays and an 8:9 ratio. The edges of the rays are asymmetrical since they form angles at 19, 21, 26 and 24 degrees. It also has indentations for the yellow (golden) irregular triangles along the borders. The JSDF Rising Sun Flag was adopted by a law/order/decree published in the Official Gazette of June 30, 1954.
