= Leonard Tan =

Singaporean musician (born 1978)

Leonard Tan is a trinational-based, Singaporean music director, conductor, tubist, violinist, and music educator at scholastic, collegiate, conservatory, and professional levels

Tan was awarded the National Institute of Education-Nanyang Technological University Overseas Graduate Scholarship to pursue a PhD in music education and conducting at the Jacobs School of Music, Indiana University Bloomington. His primary conducting mentors at the Jacobs School of Music were David Effron, Arthur Fagen, and Stephen Pratt, while his primary music education mentor was Estelle Jorgensen.

In 2013, he was appointed assistant professor of music at the National Institute of Education, Nanyang Technological University. He is also the Principal Conductor of the Singapore National Youth Orchestra from 2014 to 2018 and music director of the Philharmonic Wind Orchestra.

== Education ==
Tan spent his early musical years playing the violin and tuba, and studied harmony with Singaporean composer Leong Yoon Pin (1931–2011). Following music studies at Raffles Junior College – where he studied with Constance Wong – he went on to earn a Licentiate diploma in orchestral tuba (LRSM) from the Royal Schools of Music and a Licentiate diploma in musical theory, criticism, and literature (LMusTCL) from Trinity College London.

== Career ==
Prior to teaching and conducting, Tan was an active tubist, performing with ensembles, including the Singapore Symphony Orchestra, the Singapore Opera Orchestra, the Singapore Armed Forces Central Band, the Desford Colliery Band, and the Singapore Stompers (Dixieland Jazz).

Tan's conducting studies included work with:

- The St. Petersburg Chamber Philharmonic under Leif Segerstam (conductor of the Helsinki Philharmonic)
- Alexander Polischuk (Distinguished Professor at the St. Petersburg Conservatory)
- The Academic Orchestra Zurich under Johannes Schlaefli (Swiss conductor and pedagogue, Musikhochschule Zürich, which, in 2007, merged to become the Zurich University of the Arts)
- The University of Minnesota Symposium Wind Orchestra under Craig J. Kirchhoff (born 1949)
- The University of North Texas College of Music Wind Symphony under Eugene Corporon

== Appointments ==
Tan's numerous appointments include Conductor of the Singapore National Youth Orchestra, Singapore National Youth Sinfonia, and National University of Singapore Wind Symphony. In addition to his conducting engagements, Tan has served as music teacher at the NUS High School of Math and Science, where he taught music theory and history, music theory teacher at the Singapore Armed Forces Bands, lecturer in conducting at the LASALLE College of the Arts and lecturer in band training and direction at the Nanyang Academy of Fine Arts. He has presented lectures / workshops at the University of Hawaii, University of Kansas, University of the Pacific, Indiana University, and Nanjing University of the Arts.

Tan has conducted Singapore Symphony Orchestra musicians in a Singapore-Japan Composers Exchange Concert, Singapore National Youth Orchestra musicians in the "Ong Teng Cheong Concert," as well as several performances with the Philharmonic Winds. His conducting repertoire ranges from early classics to such twentieth-century works as Stravinsky's The Soldier's Tale, and music by Singaporean composers Leong Yoon Pin, Goh Toh Chai, and Kelly Tang. In a production of Puccini's opera Madama Butterfly, he worked with an international cast, choir, and orchestra.

As a tubist, Tan has performed with the Singapore Symphony Orchestra, Singapore Opera Orchestra, Philharmonic Chamber Orchestra, Desford Colliery Band (UK), Singapore Stompers (Dixieland), Singapore Armed Forces Tuba Quartet and the Regal Brass Quintet. As soloist, he has performed concertos by Ralph Vaughan Williams, Edward Gregson, Derek Bourgeois, and music for tuba and electronic tape by Walter B. Ross (born 1936). He conducts brass and tuba clinics and coaches the Singapore National Youth Orchestra Brass Ensemble.

== Personal life ==
In 2005, he had his first son, in 2007, he had his first daughter, in 2015, he had his second daughter.

== Honors ==
- National Arts Council Georgette Chen Arts Scholarship
- Rotary Club Training Grant
- Lee Foundation Scholarship, Raffles Junior College Creative Arts Award
- Kripalani Arts Challenge Trophy
- Associated Board of the Royal Schools of Music High Scorer's Award
- St. Margaret's Partner-In-Education Teaching Award
- CHIJ Certificate of Commendation
- World Association of Symphonic Bands and Ensembles Conducting Scholarship to study at the University of Minnesota.

== Selected discography ==
- Sonata Profana (CD), NUS Center for the Arts (publisher) (2004) OCLC 298367507 Singapore National Bibliography

Recorded 5 September 2002, NUS University Cultural Centre Hall
Leonard Tan, conductor, tracks 1 & 2

== Selected publications ==
- Review of J. Scott Goble's 2010 book, "What's So Important About Music Education?," Philosophy of Music Education Review (journal), International Society for Philosophy of Music Education, Indiana University Press, Vol. 19, Issue 2, Fall 2011, pps. 201–205 ISSN 1543-3412
- Review of Bonnie C. Wade's 2008 book, 2nd edition, "Thinking Musically: Experiencing Music, Expressing Culture," Music Educators Journal, September 2011 ISSN 0027-4321
- A Comparative Analysis of Hindemith's and Persichetti's Band Symphonies From a Neoclassical Perspective (masters thesis), National Institute of Education, Nanyang Technological University (2008) OCLC 317846253
