= Marcelo Anciano =

Singaporean pianist (1902–1990)

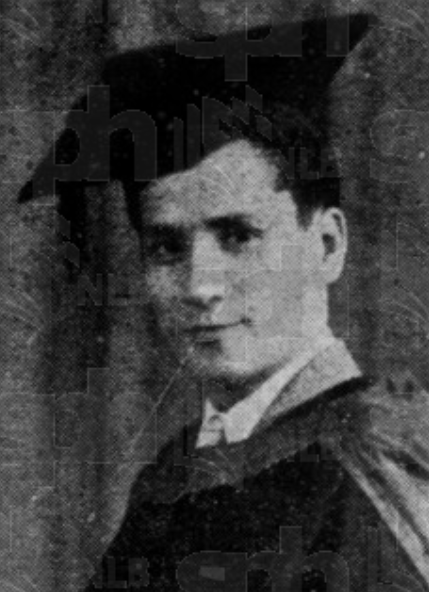
Anciano in 1939.

Marcelo R. Anciano (1902 – 25 October 1990) was a Singaporean music teacher and pianist. He was the founder and director of the Far Eastern Music School, the first music school in Singapore. A prominent member of the Filipino community of Singapore, he served as the first president of the Filipino Association of Singapore.

== Early life and education ==
Anciano was born in the province of Laguna in the Philippines. He began taking piano lessons from his father, a musician, when he was six. His father later taught him to play the violin as well, although the piano remained his main instrument. Anciano began attending the Collegio de Tiples in Manila several years after. As his parents were unable to afford his musical education, a family friend offered to financially support him on the condition that he taught music for free for three years after his graduation in 1920. He began teaching music in 1918 to support himself while he was in college. He graduated from the University of Texas at San Antonio with a music degree, despite not intending to study music when he had first started university.

== Career ==
Anciano was hired as the pianist for a liner which was to arrive in Indonesia. However, in 1926, he received an offer to join the Adelphi Hotel Orchestra in Singapore as the bandmaster and pianist. He also performed at the Raffles Hotel and the Sea View Hotel. Anciano gave private piano lessons in his spare time. In 1927, he obtained a license from the government to establish a music school. He founded the Far Eastern Music School on Short Street the following year. The school was the first of its kind on the island and there were few other piano teachers in Singapore then. The school began with 15 students, comprising former students of his and the children of those he had met at social functions, then the minimum required for a school. As the number of students increased, Anciano moved the school to larger premises on Kirk Terrace and hired additional staff, including four Jewish refugees and music teachers who had fled Germany in the 1930s.

In September 1937, Anciano became the founding president of the Filipino Association of Singapore. In 1939, he was made a fellow of the Trinity College of Music, becoming the only person in Singapore to hold the title. He had previously obtained a Licentiate from the college in 1933. In November 1940, Anciano was replaced by Paul G. Peralta as president of the Filipino Association and was instead elected vice president. He was replaced in this position by C. B. Arriola a year later when he became the association's chairman of music. The Far Eastern Music School shuttered at the start of the Japanese occupation of Singapore. However, Anciano received permission from the Japanese to reopen the school seven months after it had closed. However, he was only allowed to teach "technicalities" such as aural. He was not allowed to teach Western music. Some Japanese soldiers approached him for lessons and paid for them with rice. In October 1944, the Japanese-controlled Syonan Shimbun described Anciano as "the leader of the local Filipino community." He had again become the association's president by then.

Soon after the end of the occupation, Anciano performed with musicians Domingo Raquiza and Goh Soon Tioe at the Victoria Theatre in a programme in celebration of Filipino national hero José Rizal. In 1946, he was among the witnesses called to defend Charles Joseph Pemberton Paglar against charges of treason from the British. He was elected the treasurer of the Filipino Association in April of the same year. By July 1947, he had again become its president. In 1948, Fermin Benig was elected president of the Filipino Association in place of Anciano, who continued to sit on the association's committee. He was elected the honorary vice president of the Filipino Association in May 1951. In July, he was elected the treasurer of the Singapore Billiard Association, which had become defunct as a result of the Japanese occupation. In June of the following year, he was again elected the Filipino Association's president. Anciano was elected to the committee of the Volunteer Workers Association of Singapore in October 1955.

Students of Anciano included professor of music and concert pianist Florence Marque-Wong, National University of Singapore vice-chancellor Kwan Sai Kheong, Lee Kuan Yew's sister Monica Lee and the eight children of Eu Tong Sen. He was still teaching in 1980.

== Personal life and death ==
Anciano married Clara D'Souza at the Saint Joseph's Church on 21 April 1930. D'Souza had been a student of his and he chose to settle down in Singapore soon after marrying her. She later became "well-known in local cooking circles." The couple had eight children, several of whom became music teachers. Their daughter Hovita became a pianist. Anciano was a Rotarian. He died at the age of 88 on 25 October 1990.
