= Hovita Anciano =

Singaporean pianist (1931–2011)

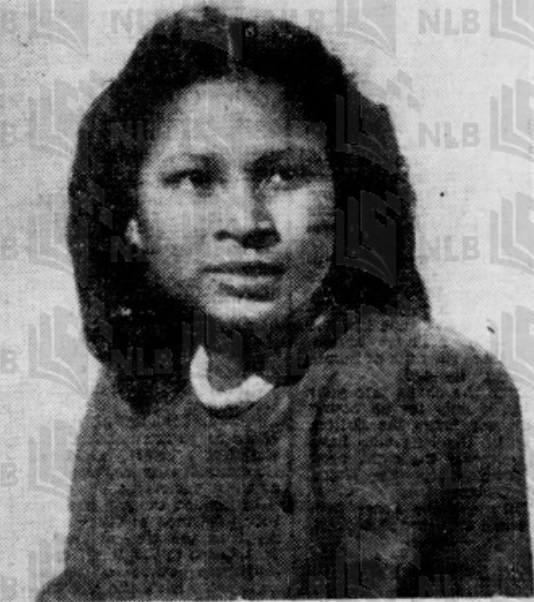
Anciano in 1949.

Hovita Senn (née Anciano; 15 February 1931 – 9 April 2011) was a pianist who was active in Singapore in the late 1940s and early 1950s.

== Early life and education ==
Anciano was born in Singapore on 15 February 1931 to music teacher, pianist and leader of the local Filipino community Marcelo Anciano and social worker Clara D'Souza. She was also a granddaughter of Clarence D'Souza, a civil servant. While in Singapore as part of his tour, British pianist Solomon heard Anciano play. She was then a student at the Far Eastern Music School, founded by her father. Solomon asked her to study at the Royal Academy of Music in London, England. On 17 February 1946, Anciano left for England and began her studies at the academy. In April 1947, The Sunday Tribune reported that she had received two scholarships, which required her to remain at the academy for three years. She had also been given "personal invitations" by Solomon to attend his recitals in London.

While at the academy, Anciano participated in public concerts. She had also learnt to play the cello. In January 1948, it was reported that Anciano was studying under musician Harold Craxton and that she would begin studying at the Conservatoire de Paris later that year. She received her Licentiate of the Royal Academy of Music in April. The Straits Times then reported that she was believed to be "amongst the youngest to obtain the degree." She was also believed to have been the "only Filipino" to have received the licentiate at the time.

== Career ==
In September 1948, while she was in London, Radio Malaya aired a recording of Anciano playing Beethoven's 32 Variations in C minor as part of its Listener's Post programme. The following month, she was offered a contract by the BBC to perform on its Children's Hour programme for one guinea a piece. Anciano returned to Singapore on 26 August 1949, with plans of giving several performances to raise funds which would facilitate the furthering of her studies in Paris. She brought with her posters to publicise her concerts that were printed in London. Anciano's first solo concert was held at the Victoria Memorial Hall on 20 November, during which she performed pieces by Bach, Scarlatti, Beethoven, Schumann and Chopin. Critic "R.W.B." of The Straits Times praised her performance of 32 Variations in C minor as "quite masterly" and opined that the concert was, for the most part, "heavenly", describing her as a "musician of great talent".

In April 1950, Anciano performed as the piano soloist at a concert of the Singapore Junior Symphony Orchestra, of which she was a former member, held on Easter Sunday at the Victoria Memorial Hall to raised funds for the St. Andrew's Mission Hospital. A critic of The Malaya Tribune considered her performance of Beethoven's Piano Concerto No. 1 in C Major to be the "weakest part" of the concert, opining that if she "studies very hard for the next five years" she would be able to "produce the real Beethoven", though "in the meantime it would be wise if she would play music which is within her present reach." Anciano made her debut in the Federation of Malaya as a pianist on 26 March with a concert held at the Town Hall of Kuala Lumpur. A critic of The Straits Times wrote that she "coped more than successfully with her programme under trying conditions and revealed that forethought had gone into its planning."

In 1958, Anciano began giving piano lessons to Peter Chin Peng Kong of the St. Nicholas' Home for the Blind in Penang. In 1964, she served as the piano accompaniment to a recital by violinist Gilopez Kabayao held on 16 August at the Malayan Teachers' Training College in Kuala Lumpur in aid of the Malayan Association for the Blind. Malaysian pianist Flavia De Souza was also a student of hers. De Souza had first heard Anciano during a recital in Kuala Lumpur and Anciano gave her a few piano lessons while in Kuala Lumpur.

== Personal life and death ==
Anciano married Samuel Senn at the Cathedral of the Good Shepherd on 15 September 1951. The couple had gotten engaged on New Year's Eve. She stated that she would continue with music "if opportunity presents itself". Together they had two sons and a daughter. By January 1954, the couple had moved to Kuala Lumpur, then in the Federation of Malaya.

Anciano eventually moved to Blonay, Switzerland. She died on 9 April 2011 after a "long battle" with cancer, during which she received treatment at the Hôpital du Samaritain in Vevey.
