= Kelly Tang =

Singaporean composer (born 1961)

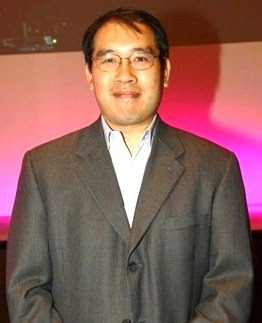

Background information
- Born: 1961 (age 64–65); Singapore
- Genres: Classical, Jazz, Film Score, Popular
- Occupations: Composer, Educator
- Years active: 1982–present

Kelly Tang (born 1961) is a Singaporean composer known internationally for his wind band, chamber and orchestral works. For his contributions to the local music scene, Tang was conferred the Cultural Medallion in 2011.

== Early life ==
Tang's love for music began at an early age. He started piano lessons at age six, and later played the tuba in his secondary school band. The young Tang did not find the tuba particularly interesting to play as there were not usually many parts in a musical composition that involved the instrument. However, this lack of activity turned out to be a blessing in disguise as it gave him the opportunity to observe what the other musicians in the band were doing and how all the parts fit together in a musical composition.

Tang began writing music even as a student. His interest in music grew and he went on to helm a Christian gospel pop group. He also played bass guitar while in Anglo-Chinese Junior College and later on in the army band.

== Education ==
Tang enrolled at York University in Toronto, Canada with the support of his parents. In 1982, during his first year as an undergraduate at York, Tang met and was greatly influenced by Srul Irving Glick, his first music composition teacher. He was awarded his master's degree in composition by Northwestern University in 1991, and received his PhD in Music at Michigan State University in 1995.

== Career ==
Tang's compositions have been performed by world-renowned ensembles such as the Russian National Orchestra, the Warsaw Philharmonic Orchestra, Minguett Quartet (Germany) and the Ensemble Contemporain of Montreal. In Singapore, his music is regularly performed by the Singapore Symphony Orchestra, the Singapore Chinese Orchestra, the Singapore National Youth Orchestra and T’ang Quartet.

In Asia, Tang’s orchestral works have been performed by the Nagoya Philharmonic Orchestra, the Royal Thai Navy Orchestra, Macau Youth Symphony Orchestra and Vietnam National Symphony Orchestra. His choral works have been sung by the Gaia Philharmonic Chorus (Japan), Windsbacher Knabenchor (Germany), Singapore Youth Choir and Calvin College Capella (USA). His wind band scores have been performed by Queensland Conservatorium Wind Orchestra (Australia), Desford Colliery Brass Band (UK), Philharmonic Winds, Singapore Symphony Orchestra and Singapore Armed Forces Central Band with "The President's Own" United States Marine Band.

Tang's compositions have been performed at prestigious venues worldwide including Carnegie Hall, Vienna Musikverien, Berlin Konzerthaus, Auditorium di Milano, Museum of Musical Instruments, The Rodahal, St. Paul’s Cathedral and Sydney Opera House. In Asia, his music has been presented at Tokyo Metropolitan Art Space, Tokyo Opera City, Suntory Hall, Hanoi Opera House, Aksra Theatre, Cultural Centre of the Philippines, Esplanade Concert Hall, Suzhou Arts & Culture Center, Zijing Grand Theatre (Nanjing), Hong Kong Academy for Performing Arts and Shanghai Concert Hall.

In 1996, Tang scored the music for the Australian feature film “Feet Unbound: Women Of The Long March”, which has screened at major film festivals in Europe, America and Asia. His Jazz compositions have been performed by pianist Jeremy Monteiro and double bassist Christy Smith with Grammy® recipients Ernie Watts (saxophone) and Randy Brecker (trumpet). Tang’s music has been commissioned for the Singapore Arts Festival (2000), Shanghai International Spring Festival (2014) and Esplanade Theatres By The Bay’s Tenth Anniversary Celebrations (2012). His works have been featured at the Cultural Diversity in Music Education (CDIME) and World Association of Symphonic Bands & Ensembles (WASBE) international conferences.

Through the annual Singapore Youth Festival, Tang’s music is performed each year by thousands of students in school choirs and wind bands. His compositions are taught as part of the Ministry of Education’s music curriculum, and he continues to mentor young composers and conduct composition workshops at schools and colleges across Singapore.

Since 1996, he has served as Associate Professor of Music at National Institute of Education. In November 2011, he took on a new role as Dean at School of the Arts.

=== Special commissions ===
Two Overtures for Wind Band by Kelly Tang was commissioned by the Co-Curricular Activities Branch of the Singapore Ministry of Education for the Singapore Youth Festival 2009 Central Judging of Concert Bands. It later on became the set piece for Singapore Youth Festival 2025 as well.

Later on, in 2014, Tang was commissioned by the National Arts Council and the Singapore Symphony Orchestra to write an original composition for the opening ceremony of Victoria Theatre and Concert Hall on 15 July 2014. His work "Capriccio for Orchestra" was performed under the baton of SSO Music Director Lan Shui, with Singapore's Prime Minister Lee Hsien Loong, Emeritus Senior Minister Goh Chok Tong and Cabinet Minister Lawrence Wong in attendance.

In celebration of Singapore's Golden Jubilee, Tang was commissioned to compose a piano concerto for "Sing50", a performance on 7 August 2015 showcasing Singapore's rich music history. His new work "Concerto in Three Movements" was premiered by virtuoso pianist Lang Lang and the Metropolitan Festival Orchestra, under the baton of Chan Tze Law.

=== Awards ===
In 2008, Tang was conferred the COMPASS Artistic Excellence Award by the Composers and Authors Society of Singapore.

For his contributions to the local music scene, Tang was conferred the Cultural Medallion in 2011, the highest award for the arts in Singapore.

== See also ==
- Jeremy Monteiro
- Christy Smith
