= Clara Anciano =

Singaporean social worker (died 1985)

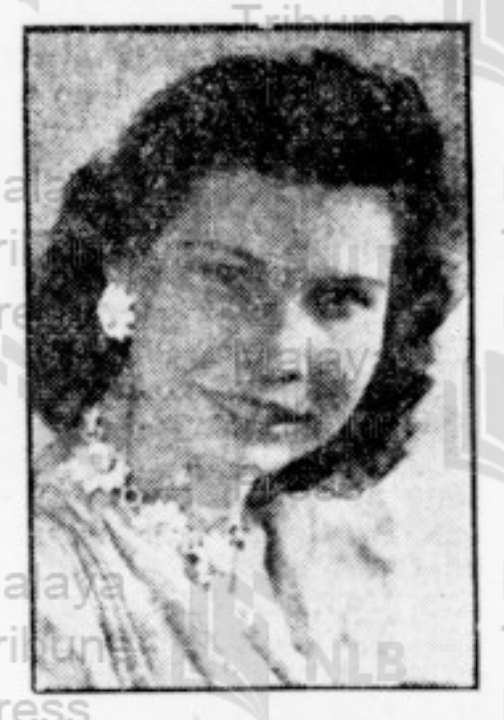
Anciano in 1947.

Clara Anciano (née D'Souza; died 12 July 1985) was a Singaporean social worker who served as the president of the local branch of the Inner Wheel Club.

== Early life and education ==
Anciano was the daughter of civil servant Clarence D'Souza. Her mother was French.

== Career ==
By November 1947, Anciano had begun volunteering at a child feeding centre on Maxwell Road. By October 1948, she had been made the honorary secretary of the local branch of the Inner Wheel Club She was then making monthly visits to the Leper colony in Yio Chu Kang as the representative of the Catholic Church and the Inner Wheel Club on the Leper Committee. She was elected the president of the Inner Wheel Club of Singapore in May of the following year. In April 1952, Anciano was elected a member of the committee of the Singapore Association of the Blind, which had been formed in November of the previous year. She was among the 20 "well-known" social workers who formed the Singapore Leprosy Relief Association in the same month, headed by Canon R. K. S. Adams. The following month, she was instead elected the Inner Wheel Club of Singapore's vice-president.

The Singapore Free Press reported in October 1954 that Anciano was a proprietor of the Far Eastern Music School, founded by her husband. In October 1955, she was elected to the committee the Volunteer Workers Association of Singapore. The Singapore Free Press reported in March 1957 that Anciano was then an executive with the local branch of the British Red Cross Society and that she was an honorary life member of the society. According to the Free Press in May 1961, she was a "well-known figure in local welfare work". By then, she had again been elected the president of the Inner Wheel Club of Singapore. In March 1964, Anciano was elected a member of the committee of the Pan Pacific South Asian Women's Association.

== Personal life and death ==
Anciano married music teacher Marcelo Anciano at the Saint Joseph's Church on 21 April 1930. They had met when she began studying at the school he had founded and taught at, the Far Eastern Music School. Marcelo, who had come from the Philippines, decided to settle down in Singapore because of her. Together, they had eight children, including concert pianist Hovita Anciano. Susan Barrie of The Straits Times called Anciano "one of Singapore's most enthusiastic cooks." She was reportedly "well-known in local cooking circles", as well as a "cooking and baking expert". According to the New Nation, she had won several cooking competitions with her own recipes.

Anciano died on 12 July 1985. She was cremated at the crematorium at the Mount Vernon Columbarium Complex.
