= Lim Soon Lee =

Singaporean conductor and violist (born 1957)

- 林順利
- Born: 3 August 1957 (age 69); Singapore
- Education: Eastman School of Music (BM); Lausanne Academy of Music
- Occupations: Conductor; violist
- Years active: 1980s–present
- Employers: Singapore National Youth Orchestra; National University of Singapore
- Style: Classical

Lim Soon Lee (Chinese: 林順利; pinyin: Lín Shùn Lì; born 3 August 1957) is a Singaporean conductor and violist.

== Education ==
Soon Lee began his piano and violin training at a young age, under the tutelage of Goh Soon Tioe, Tan Kah Chin, Tan Kian Seng, Moses Wang and Vivien Goh.

In 1983, under the Singapore Public Service Commission / Singapore Symphony Orchestra Scholarship, Soon Lee attended and graduated from the Eastman School of Music at the University of Rochester, New York, with a Bachelor of Music (Distinction). He studied the viola under the world-renowned violists Atar Arad and Francis Tursi and completed a two-year conducting course with Professors David Effron and Donald Hunsberger. In the summers of 1984 and 1986, he served as principal violist at Germany's Heidelberg Music Festival and was awarded a scholarship to study the viola under Kim Kashkashian at the Lausanne Academy of Music in Switzerland in 1986.

== Awards ==
Lim won the First Prize in the Lower Strings Open Section at the Singapore National Music Competition in 1981. The same year, he obtained his Licentiate of the Royal Schools of Music for violin and viola. Soon Lee was awarded the Jean Frederic Perrenoud Prize with Certificate of Distinction in Orchestral Conducting at the 4th Vienna International Music Competition in 1995. He was also the finalist for the Outstanding Young Persons of Singapore Award conferred by the Orchid Jayceettes of Singapore in recognition of his contribution to the social development of Singapore.

== Conducting career ==
Upon his return to Singapore, Soon Lee played with the Singapore Symphony Orchestra (SSO) and served as the sub-principal violist from 1989 to 1997. He conducted the SSO at the opening and closing ceremonies of the 17th SEA Games (1983), the SSO Family Concert (1983) and at the World Trade Organisation First Ministerial Conference's Farewell Concert (1996). He also conducted the Asian Youth Orchestra during the National Day Parade in 1997. Soon Lee served on the National Arts Council Resource Panel and was an advisor for the National Music Competition from 1987 to 1997. In 2000, Soon Lee was invited to conduct the New World Symphony orchestra in Miami. He also conducted Mozart's Requiem at the Dennis Keene Choral Festival, with the Keat Singers in Connecticut. In 2001, Soon Lee conducted the Czech Republic's Plyzen Radio Symphony Orchestra during the International Sibelius Symposium Masterclass with Jorma Panula. Soon Lee has been a viola tutor of the Penang State Symphony Orchestra since 2000, and he conducted the orchestra in 2003. Soon Lee is currently the music director of the Singapore National Youth Orchestra and has been the music director and resident conductor of the National University of Singapore Symphony Orchestra since 1994.

In 2005, Soon Lee was appointed conductor of the Singapore National Youth Orchestra.

In 2010, Soon Lee formed a string quartet, La Vida Quartet, with the youngest member aged 17, and oldest, 53. He is the violinist and the oldest in the quartet.

As of 2018, he is the conductor of the prestigious Nanyang Girls' High School String Ensemble, bringing in a Distinction at the Singapore Youth Festivals in 2015, 2017, 2019, 2021 and 2023. In addition to this, he and the ensemble achieved fourth place with outstanding success in the Summa Cum Laude Festival held in Vienna, Austria.
