= 302nd Military Police Company =

- 第302保安警務中隊
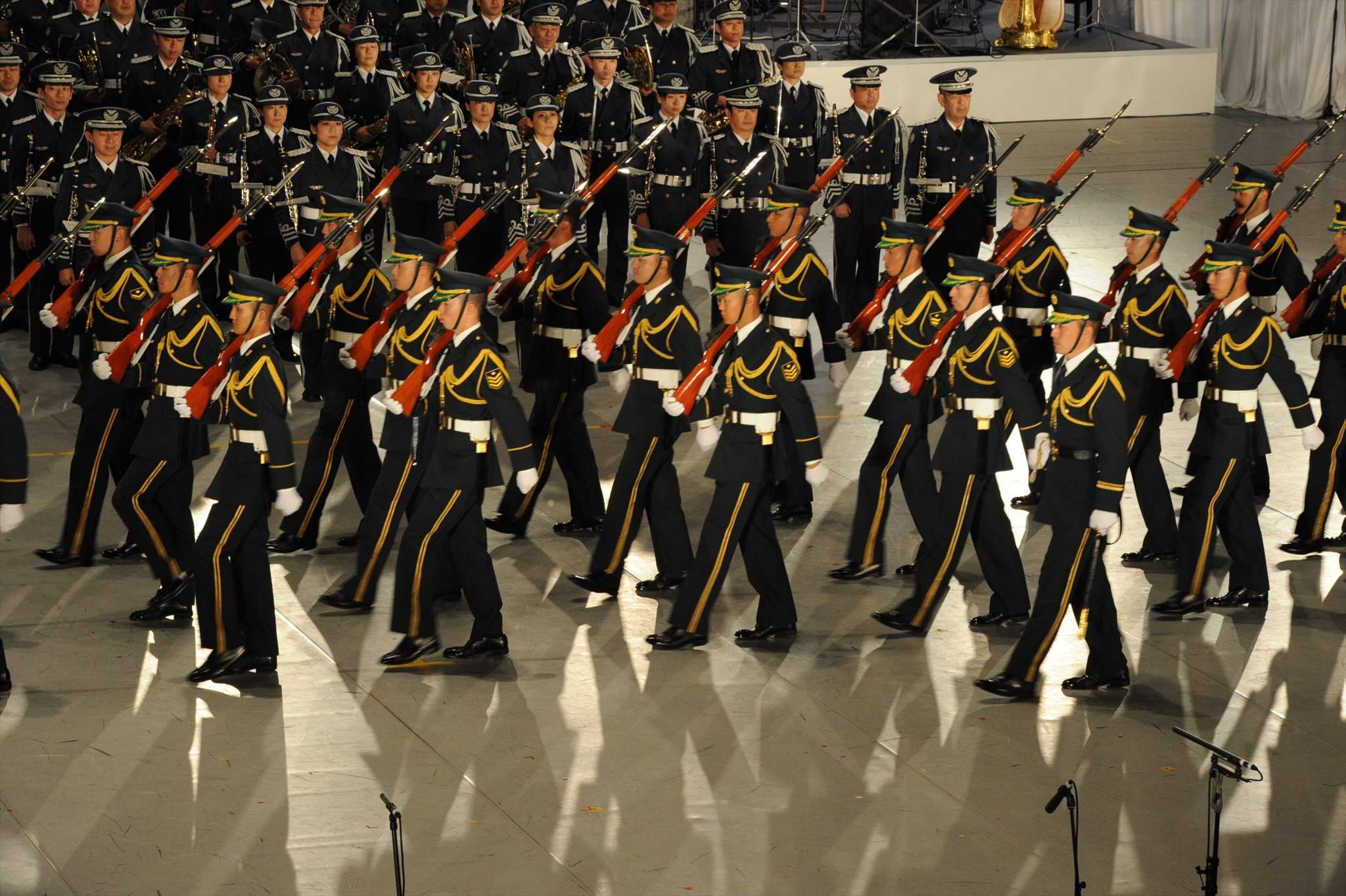
- The unit at the JSDF Marching Festival
- Active: 21 April 1957; 67 years ago
- Country: Japan
- Branch: Japan Ground Self-Defense Force
- Type: Honor guard and protection force
- Role: Security/Public duties
- Part of: Eastern Army; Eastern Army Military police Group (In Japanese)
- Garrison/HQ: Camp Ichigaya (In Japanese), Tokyo
- Motto(s): "One hundred members as one"

The 302nd Military Police Company (第302保安警務中隊, Dai sanbyakuni hoan keimu chūtai) is a military unit of the Japan Ground Self-Defense Force (JGSDF), based in Tokyo. It is known for being a ceremonial guard of honor and public protection unit of the JGSDF.

In wartime situations, the company serves as a military police unit.

== History ==
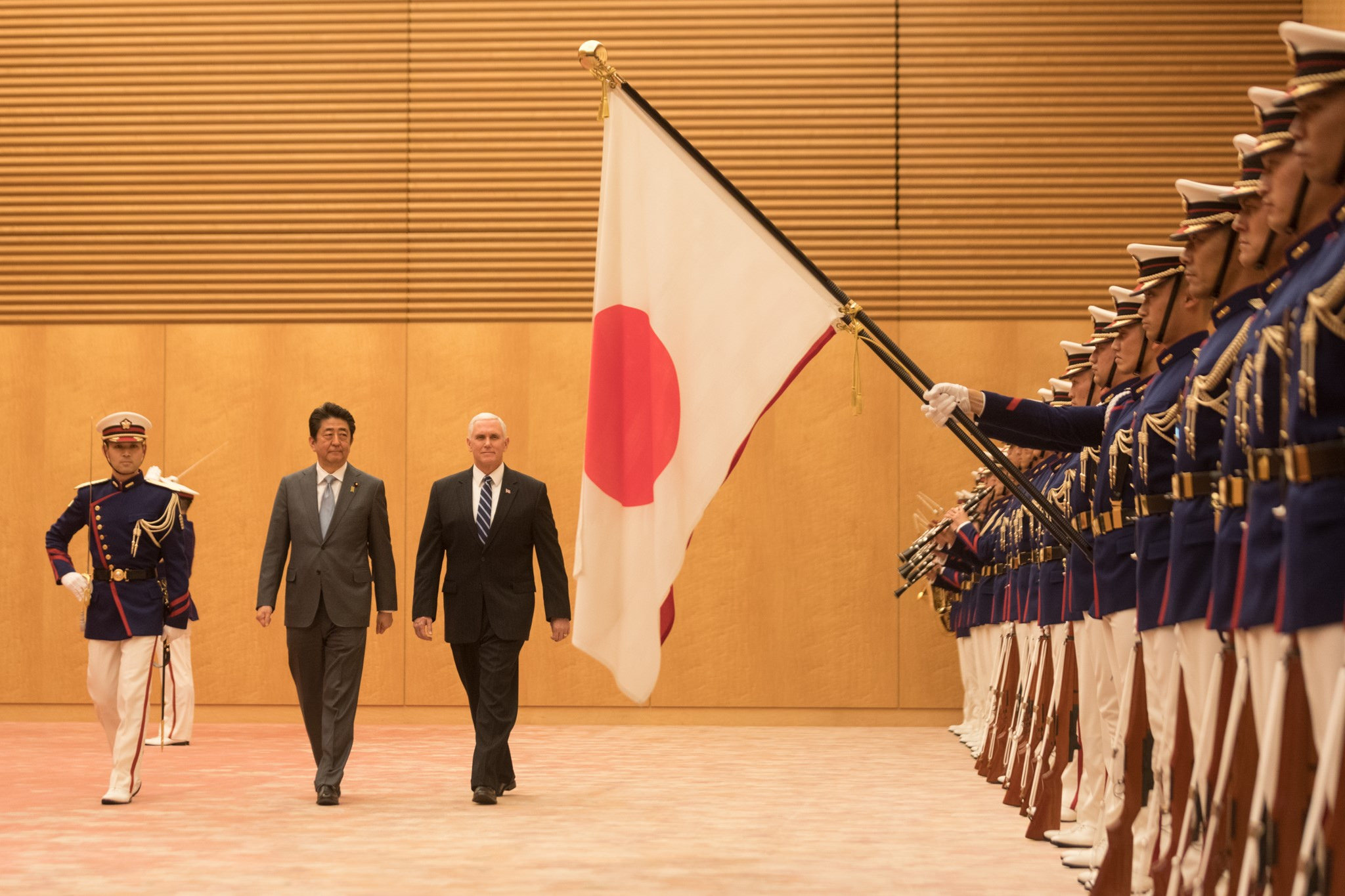
The Special Ceremonial Detachment of the 302nd Military Police Company typically mount an honor guard during state visits.

It was established in 1959, following a Cabinet Secretariat decision in August 1957 determining that the SDF would established a Special Guard of Honor. Its first honor guard ceremony was held 1 October 1957, when the company honored Prime Minister Nobusuke Kishi during a military parade in front of the Meiji Memorial Picture Gallery. Three days later, Indian Prime Minister Jawaharlal Nehru became the first to receive a guard of honor as a foreign guest.

The company celebrated its 2,500th honor guard when it welcomed the Supreme Commander of the Swedish Armed Forces on 2 March 2015. Prior to performing at a welcoming ceremony, it engages in three days worth of training. M1 Garands are the standard rifle for the unit. It commonly performs drill routines with cadets from the National Defense Academy of Japan during the JSDF Marching Festival in November.

In October 2015, Prime Minister Shinzo Abe held an award ceremony at the Prime Minister's Office, during which he said "...that Japan’s Special Guard of Honor is the best in the world".

== Duties ==
Today, it mounts a ceremonial guard when foreign leaders make state visit to Tokyo, usually through being assembled outside the Chōwaden Reception Hall at the Tokyo Imperial Palace or the Prime Minister's Official Residence or Tokyo Haneda Airport. It also provided a ceremonial guard during the Imperial Funeral of Hirohito in February 1989, the Enthronement Ceremony of Akihito in November 1990, and the 26th G8 summit in July 2000.

== Structure ==
The 115-strong company has the following organization:

- 1st platoon (three honor guard squads)
- 2nd platoon (three honor guard squads)
- 3rd platoon (three honor guard squads)

During ceremonies in the Special Guard of Honor, the Japan Ground Self-Defense Force Central Band reinforces the company. In addition a platoon of buglers from the JGSDF reinforces the company during military parades to provide additional accompaniment.

== Gallery ==
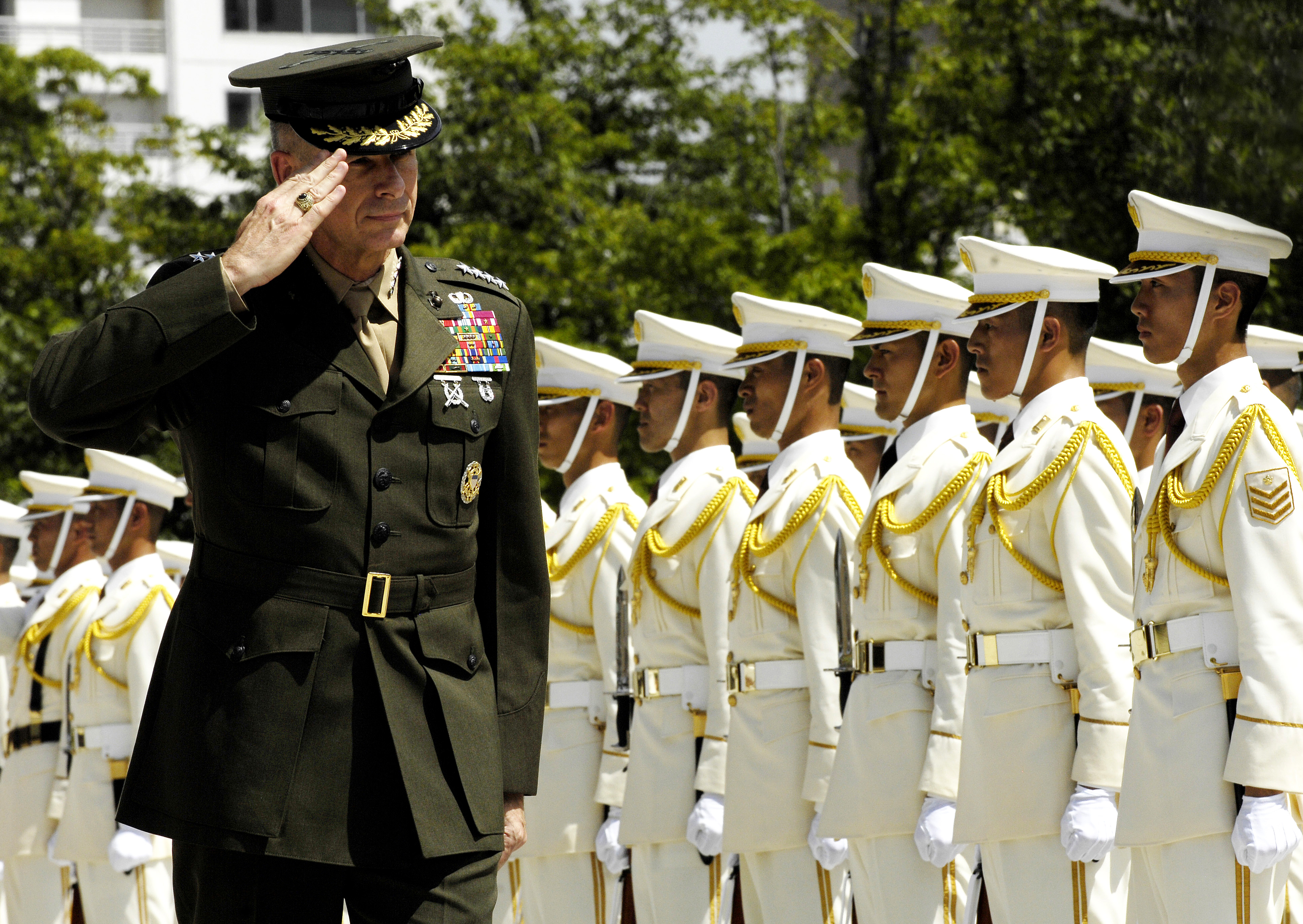
General Peter Pace inspecting the company dressed in its white full dress uniform.

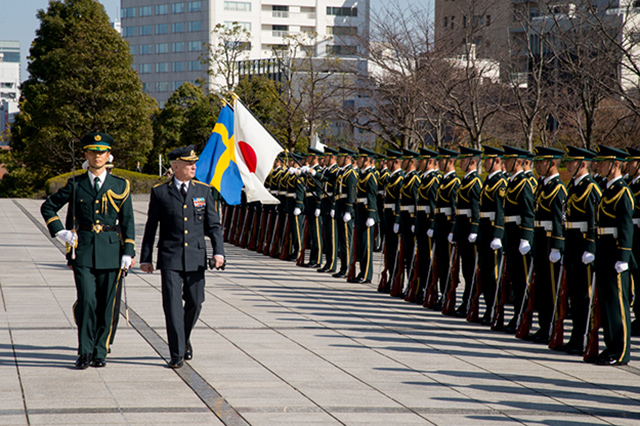
Supreme Commander of the Swedish Armed Forces Micael Bydén inspecting the company in March 2015.

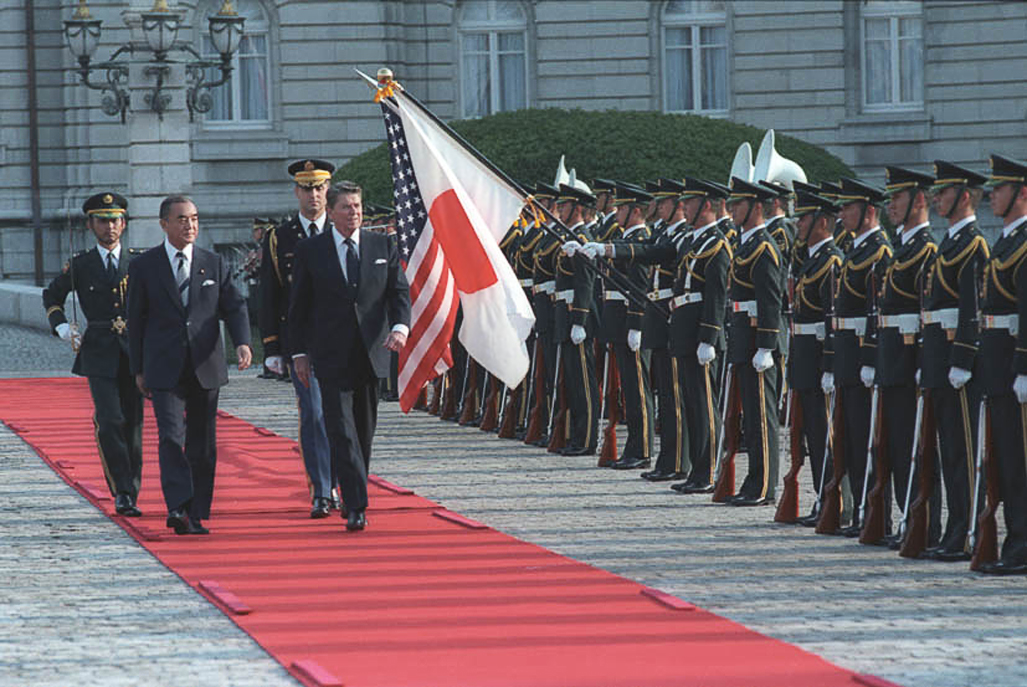
President Ronald Reagan inspecting the company in 1986.

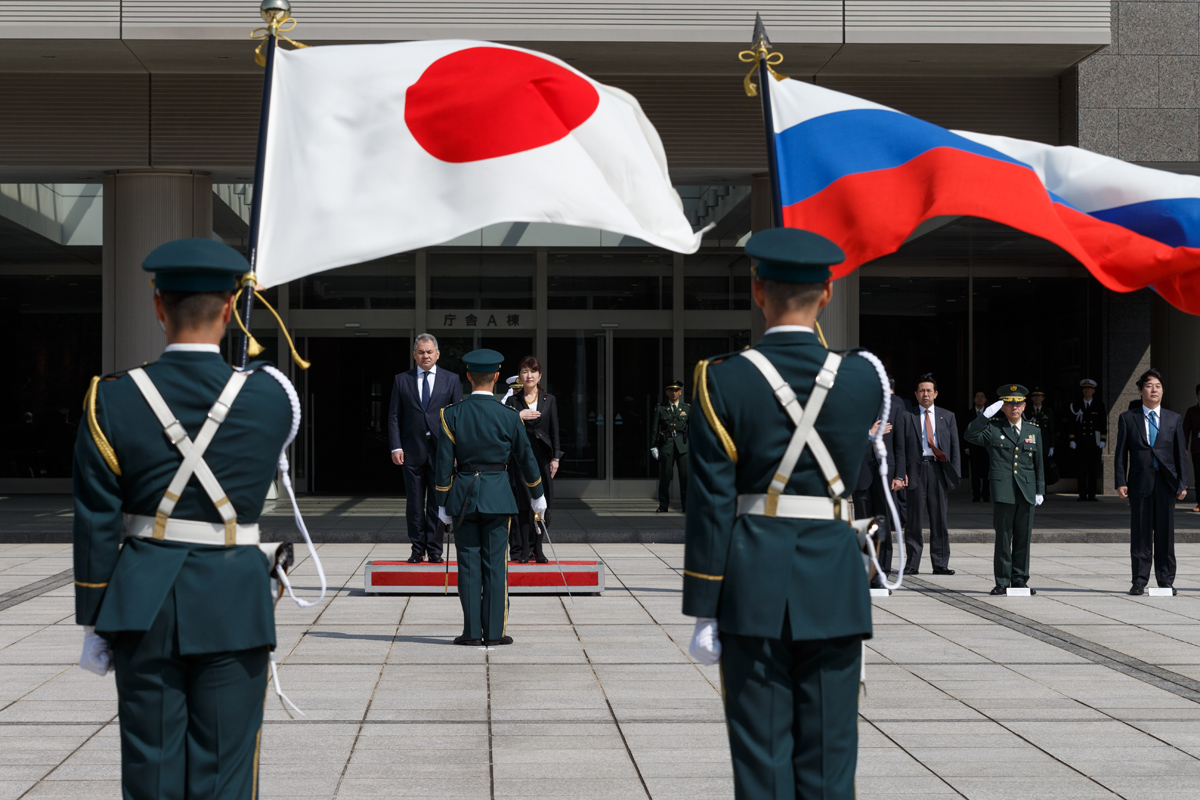
Members of the company carrying the Flag of Japan and the Flag of Russia during the visit of Russian General Sergey Shoygu in 2017.
