= Philharmonic Wind Orchestra =

Wind orchestra in Singapore

The Philharmonic Wind Orchestra is a Singaporean semi-professional wind orchestra. The orchestra was formed in 2000 with Robert Casteels as Music Director and currently has more than 70 members. It is currently under the artistic leadership of Music Director Leonard Tan.

The Philharmonic Winds has performed a collection of landmark works of the wind band repertoire, ranging from the symphonies of Paul Hindemith and James Barnes, to the well-known favourites of Alfred Reed and Adam Gorb. The wind orchestra is also well-versed in a variety of musical styles, having explored the lush and humorous music of Percy Grainger, the genius of Mozart and Varèse, jazz standards in "All That Jazz", authentic "Sounds of Japan", and an "Absoluut Dutch" affair with highly acclaimed composer, Johan de Meij.

The Philharmonic Winds has collaborated with renowned musicians from all over the world. Soloists featured include baritone Maarten Koningsberger, cellist Roeland Duijne and trombonist Jörgen van Rijen from the Netherlands, saxophonist Vincent Gnojek, marimbist Kevin Bobo and brass quintet Boston Brass from USA, euphonium player Kevin Thompson from Canada, saxophonist Shin-ichiro Hikosaka from Japan, trumpeters Dai Zhonghui from China and Yeh Shu-Han from Taiwan, as well as pianist Hae-Jung Kim from Korea. The ensemble has also worked with locally based soloists such as clarinettist Tang Xiao Ping, yangqin player Qu Jian Qing, and saxophonist Fabian Lim. The ensemble has also performed under the baton of distinguished conductors, both local and international, such as Johan de Meij, John Boyd, Robert Casteels, Zechariah Goh Toh Chai, Principal Guest Conductor Timothy Reynish, and Music Director Leonard Tan.

The Philharmonic Winds staged two concerts dedicated to works of Singaporean and Singapore-based composers, such as Zechariah Goh Toh Chai, Leong Yoon Pin, Phoon Yew Tien and Kelly Tang. The ensemble also regularly performs compositions and arrangements of established Singaporean musicians.

The Philharmonic Winds has also worked with the Penang Arts Council and Singapore Lyric Opera as the accompanying orchestra in Giacomo Puccini's Madama Butterfly and Kurt Weill's Street Scenes. In 2008, the ensemble collaborated with the Esplanade to present an all-pop concert, with tunes specially arranged for wind orchestra, featuring well-known vocal artists Sebastian Tan and Tay Kewei.

The Philharmonic Winds participates regularly in arts outreach programmes, with the intent to reach out to the masses and build new audiences for wind music. Working with the National Arts Council, the ensemble performed at several installments of the Concert in the Park series and the Singapore Arts Festival outreach programme. Past engagements also include the Arts In The City series, Beautiful Sunday series at the Esplanade and the Arts For Health programme at the Singapore General Hospital. Since 2008, The Philharmonic Winds has been part of the SPH Gift of Music series by Singapore Press Holdings, entertaining thousands at various locations with music scored by local composers such as Ong Jiin Joo and Tan Yan Zhang.

== History ==
The Philharmonic Winds, also known as PhilWinds, was formed in 2000.

In 2002, The Philharmonic Winds initiated the Philharmonic Youth Winds, providing an opportunity for young musicians under 25 to further their ensemble experience. In 2008, the young orchestra was named the top Division 1 band at the inaugural Singapore International Band Festival (SIBF), under the baton of its resident conductor Adrian Chiang and the guidance of musicians from The Philharmonic Winds. In SIBF 2018, they competed in the Concert Division and achieved the Gold award, once again under the baton of Adrian Chiang.

In July 2005, The Philharmonic Winds participated in the World Music Contest held in Kerkrade, the Netherlands, and became the first wind orchestra from Singapore to be awarded a Gold Medal with Distinction in the First Division (Harmony Band).

In 2006, The Philharmonic Winds was commissioned by the National Arts Council of Singapore to write a symphony, Second Symphony, for the Singapore Arts Festival which The Philharmonic Winds also performed at.

In 2007, The Philharmonic Winds was the orchestra-in-residence at Lasalle-SIA College of the Arts.

In 2008, the Philharmonic Youth Winds performed its first installment of their Classiques! concert series - an annual concert showcasing the very best of youth wind music in Singapore. The concert series has featured major wind band repertoire and challenging new compositions such as Johan de Meij’s Extreme Makeover (Classiques! Extreme 2009, Classiques! Europa 2020), and symphony orchestra transcriptions such as Mahler’s Symphony no. 1 and Tchaikovsky’s 1812 Overture.

In May 2009, the band was invited to perform at the 40th anniversary of the Japan Band Clinic held in Hamamatsu, Japan.

In 2022, The Philharmonic Winds and Philharmonic Youth Winds merged to become the Philharmonic Wind Orchestra.
