= JSDF Marching Festival =

Cultural military tattoo in the JSDF

Japan Self-Defense Forces Marching Festival 自衛隊音楽まつり
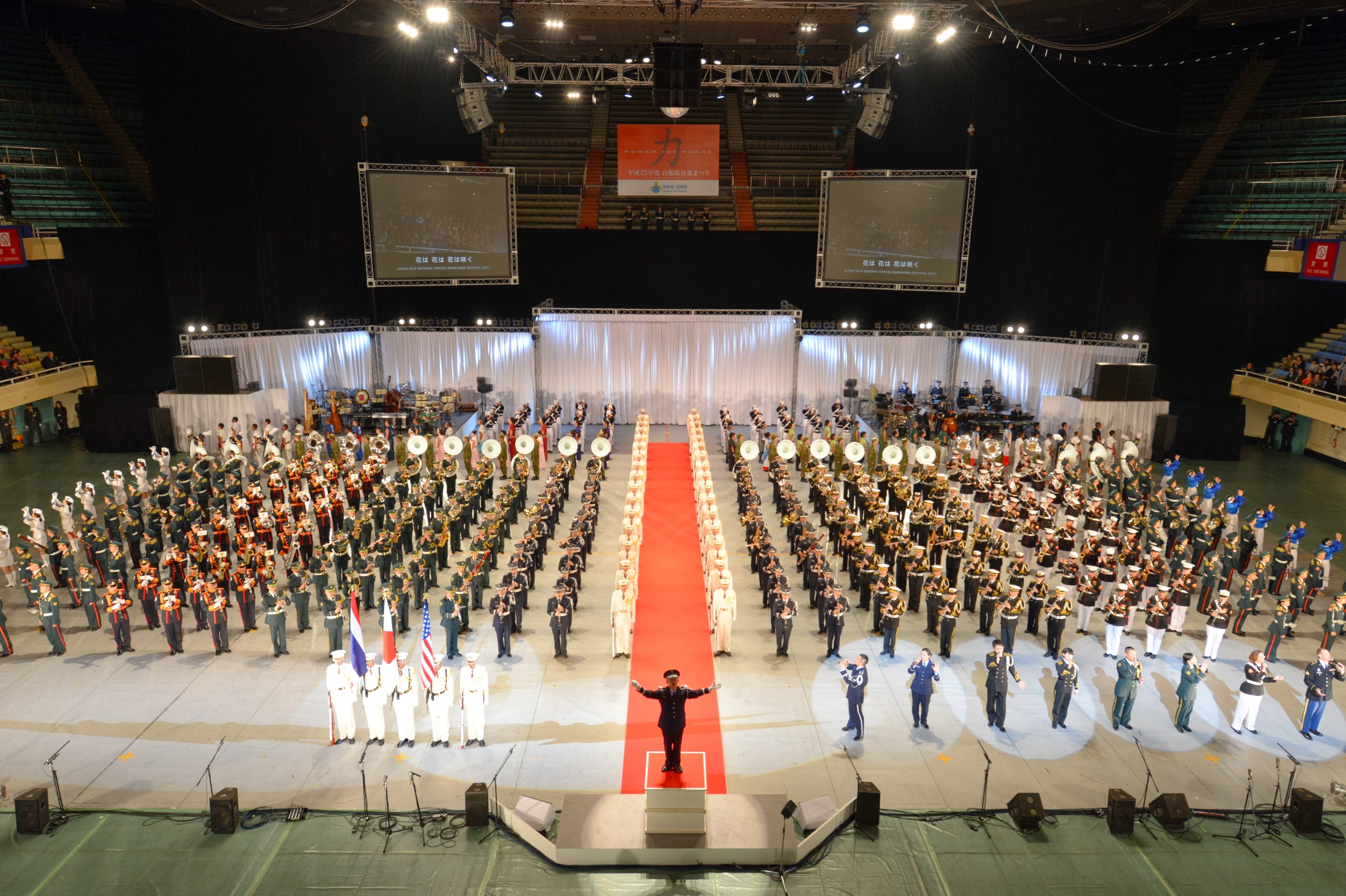
- Genre: military tattoo
- Dates: Every November
- Locations: Nippon Budokan, Tokyo, Japan
- Years active: 1963 – present
- Website: Official website (Japanese)

The Japan Self-Defense Forces (JSDF) Marching Festival (自衛隊音楽まつり, Jieitai Ongaku Matsuri) is the main cultural military tattoo in Tokyo, which features guest bands from the Asia-Pacific regions as well as bands of the Japan Self-Defense Forces. It is regularly held at the Nippon Budokan in Tokyo every November. The festival was established in 1963, and is one of the oldest military tattoos in the Asia-Pacific region.

== History ==
The first event was held at the Tokyo Metropolitan Gymnasium as an independent Self-Defense Force commemorative event on 27 October 1963. It has been held every year since 1964, particularly during the Tokyo Olympics and in 1988, when the Emperor's medical condition worsened and celebratory events were therefore requested. From 1973, Nippon Budokan began to be used as a venue, however in 2019 (the first year of the Reiwa era), it was held at the Yoyogi National Gymnasium due to the renovation of the Budokan.

== Overview ==
The content of each performance is a 2-hour presentation, which is composed of various songs such as pops, classical, jazz, theme music of movie and TV drama, anime songs, game music, and Japanese folk songs.

Every year, the last performance on the last day is broadcast simultaneously on the Internet, and edited DVDs are also marketed at a later date.

The organizer is Minister of Defense, with JGSDF Chief of Staff being in charge of implementation.

== Notable participants ==
The following multinational units have participated in the three day festival over the years:

=== Regular and semi-regular participants ===
- Japan Ground Self-Defense Force Central Band
- Japan Maritime Self-Defense Force Band, Tokyo (central band of JMSDF)
- Japan Air Self-Defense Force Central Band
- (Japan) JGSDF Northern Army Band
- (Japan) JGSDF North Eastern Army Band
- (Japan) JGSDF Eastern Army Band
- (Japan) JGSDF Central Army Band
- (Japan) JGSDF Western Army Band
- (Japan) Jieidaiko (JSDF Taiko Teams)
- JGSDF 302nd Military Police Company (national honor guard of Japan)
- (Japan) National Defense Academy Honor Guard
- United States Marine Corps III Marine Expeditionary Force Band
- United States Seventh Fleet Band
- United States Air Force Band of the Pacific-Asia

=== Regular participants in past ===
- United States Army Japan Band (1981 - 2023)

=== Guest participants in past ===
- (Australia) Australian Army Band
- (France) Bagad Lann Bihoue of the French Navy
- (Germany) Staff Band of the Bundeswehr
- (India) Indian Army Chief's Band
- (Jordan) Jordanian Armed Forces Band
- (Korea) Korean Navy Band
- (Malaysia) Malaysian Armed Forces Central Band
- (Philippines) Philippine Marine Corps Drum and Bugle Team
- Singapore Armed Forces Band
- (Thailand) Royal Thai Air Force Band
- (Thailand) Royal Thai Army Band
- Military Ceremonial Troupe of the Vietnam People’s Army

== Photos ==
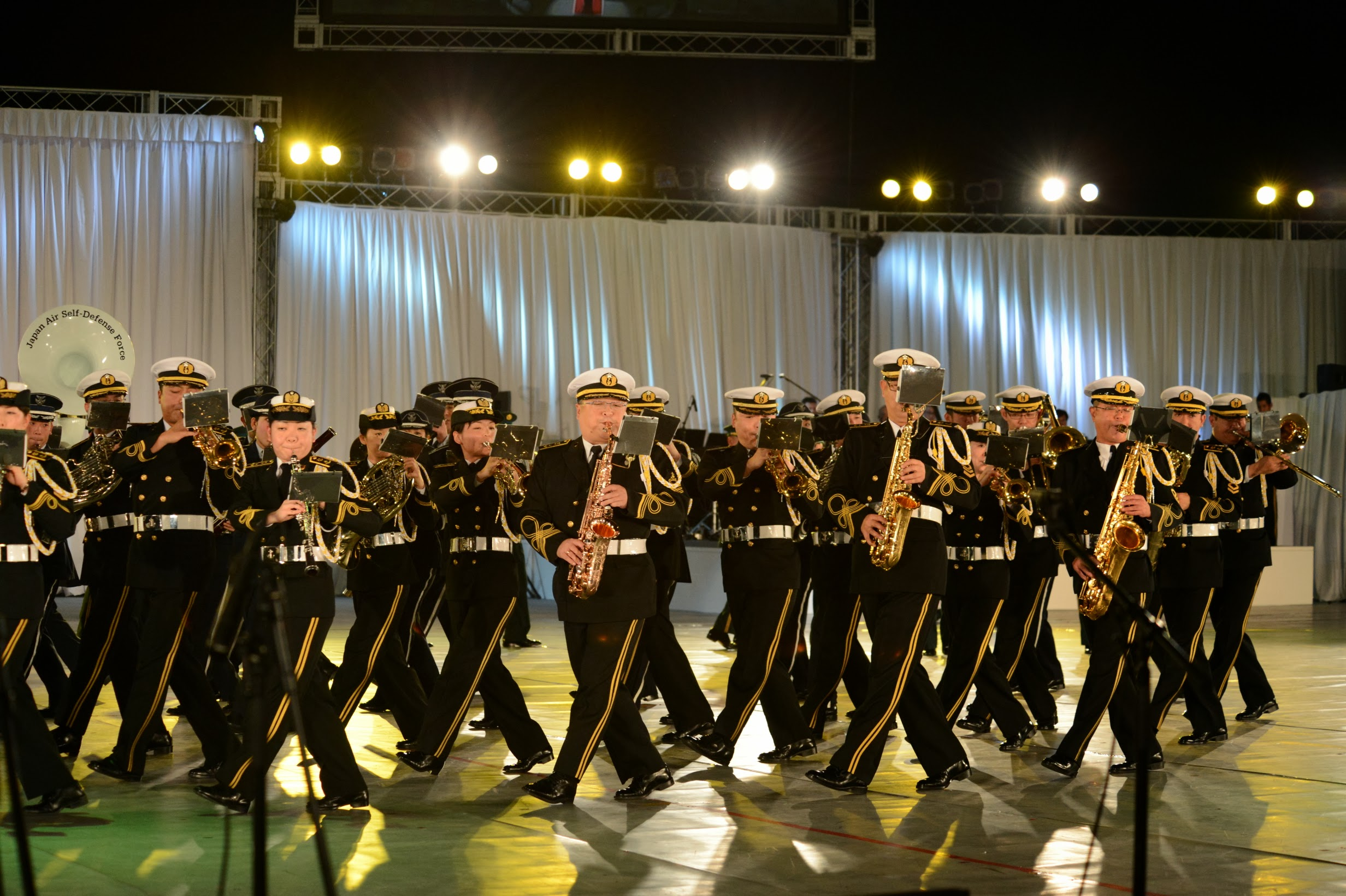
JMSDF Band, Tokyo

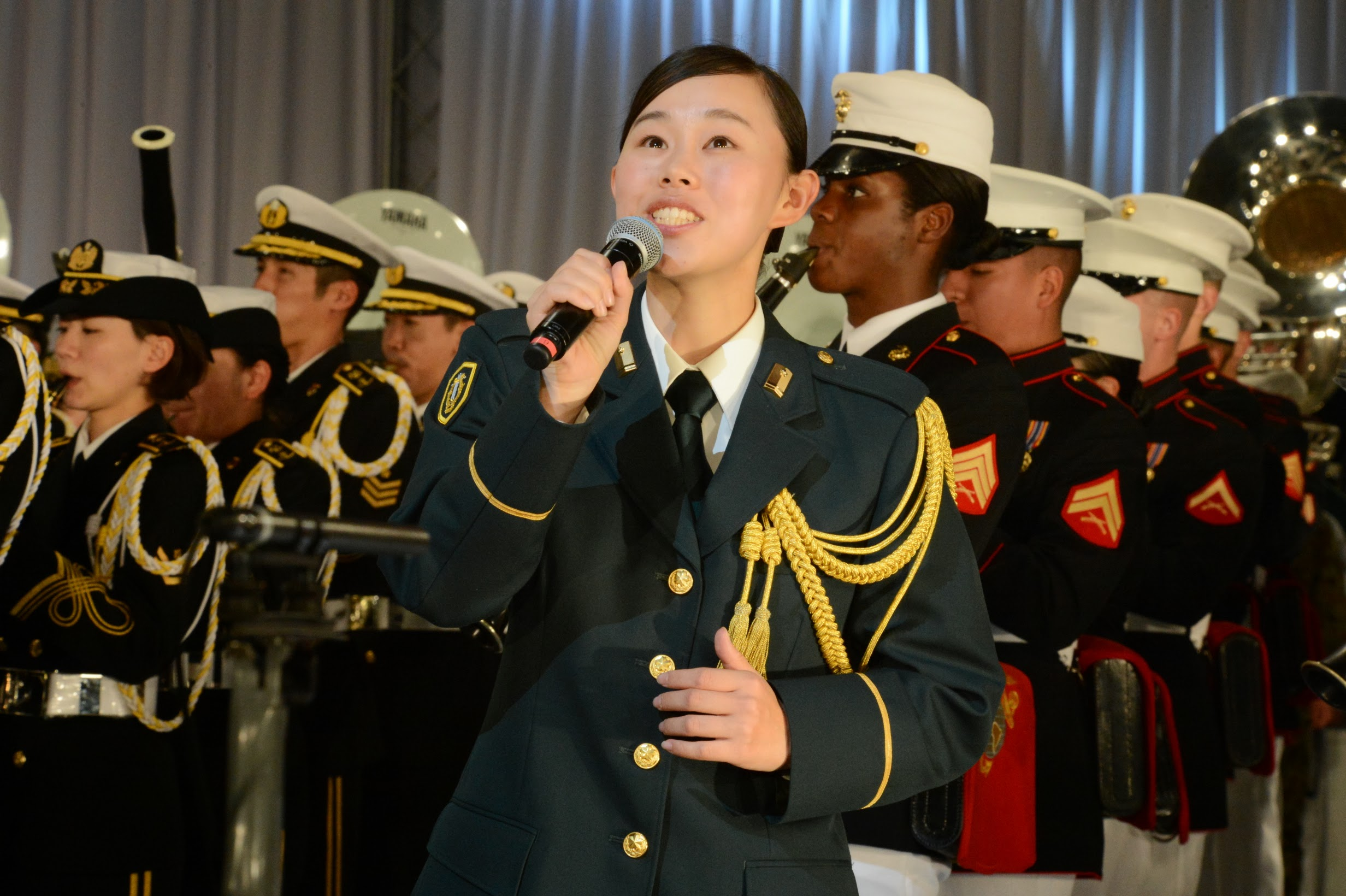
JGSDF military singer

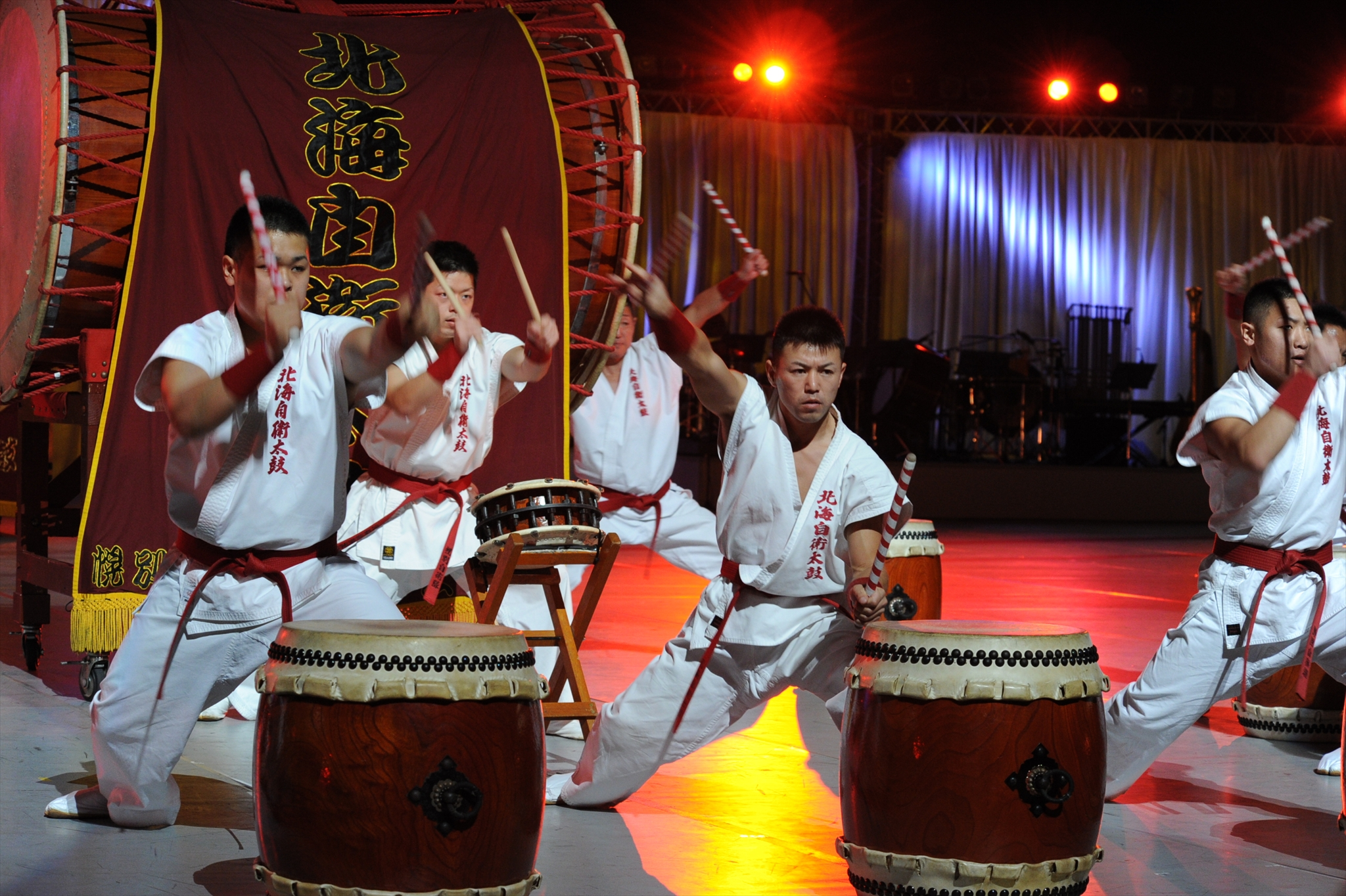
Taiko playing

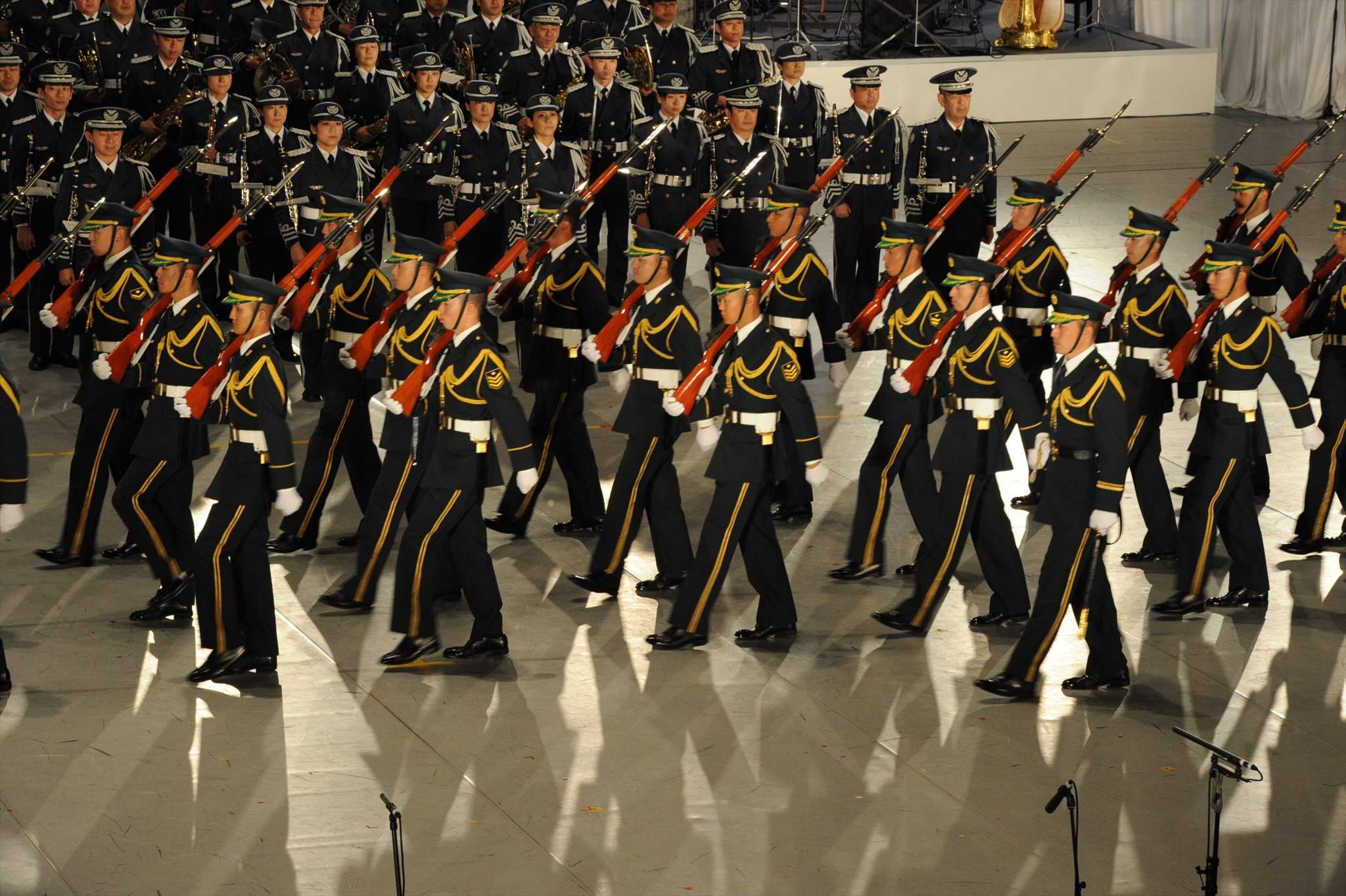
National Honor Guard

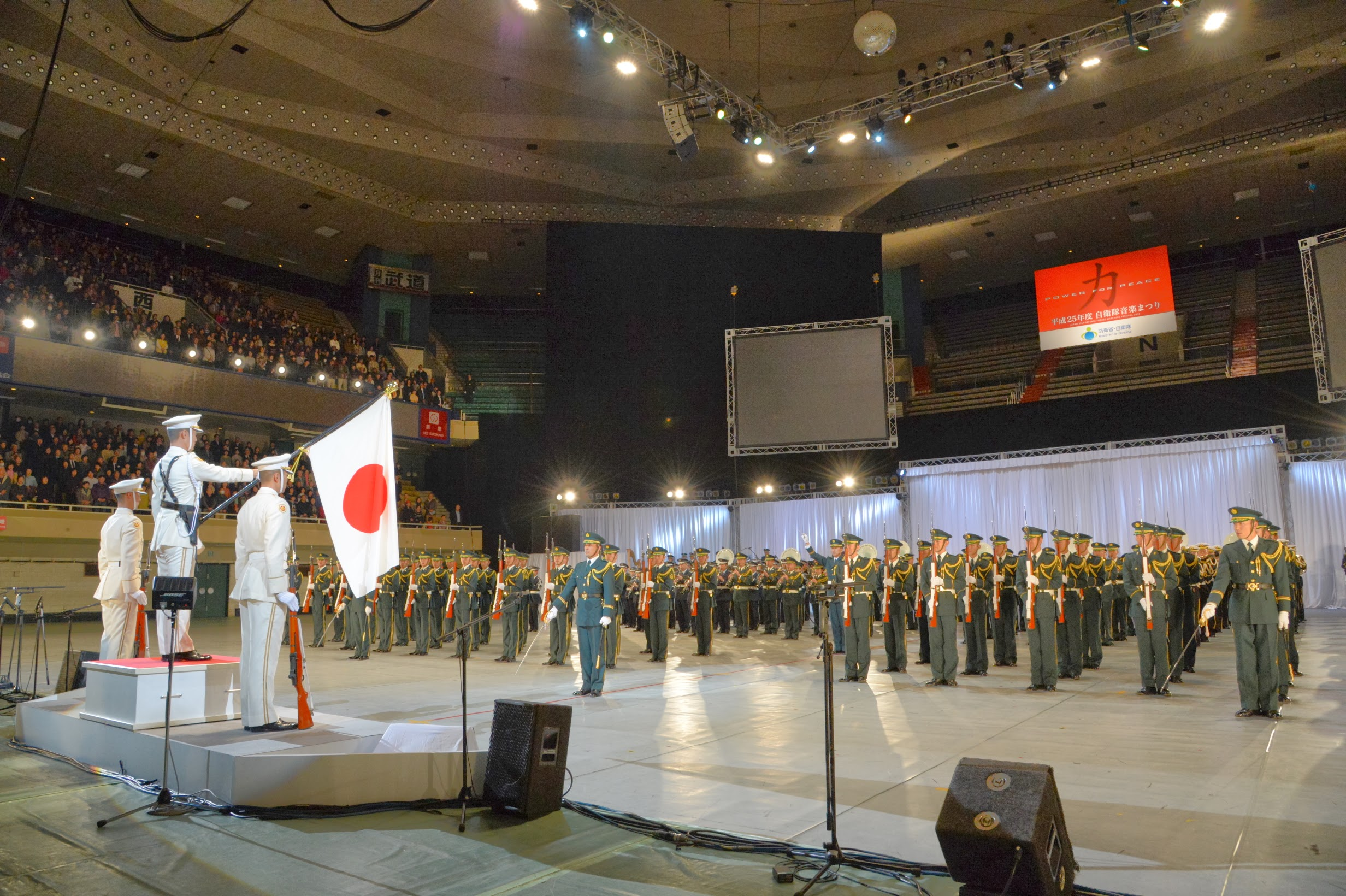
National flag admission

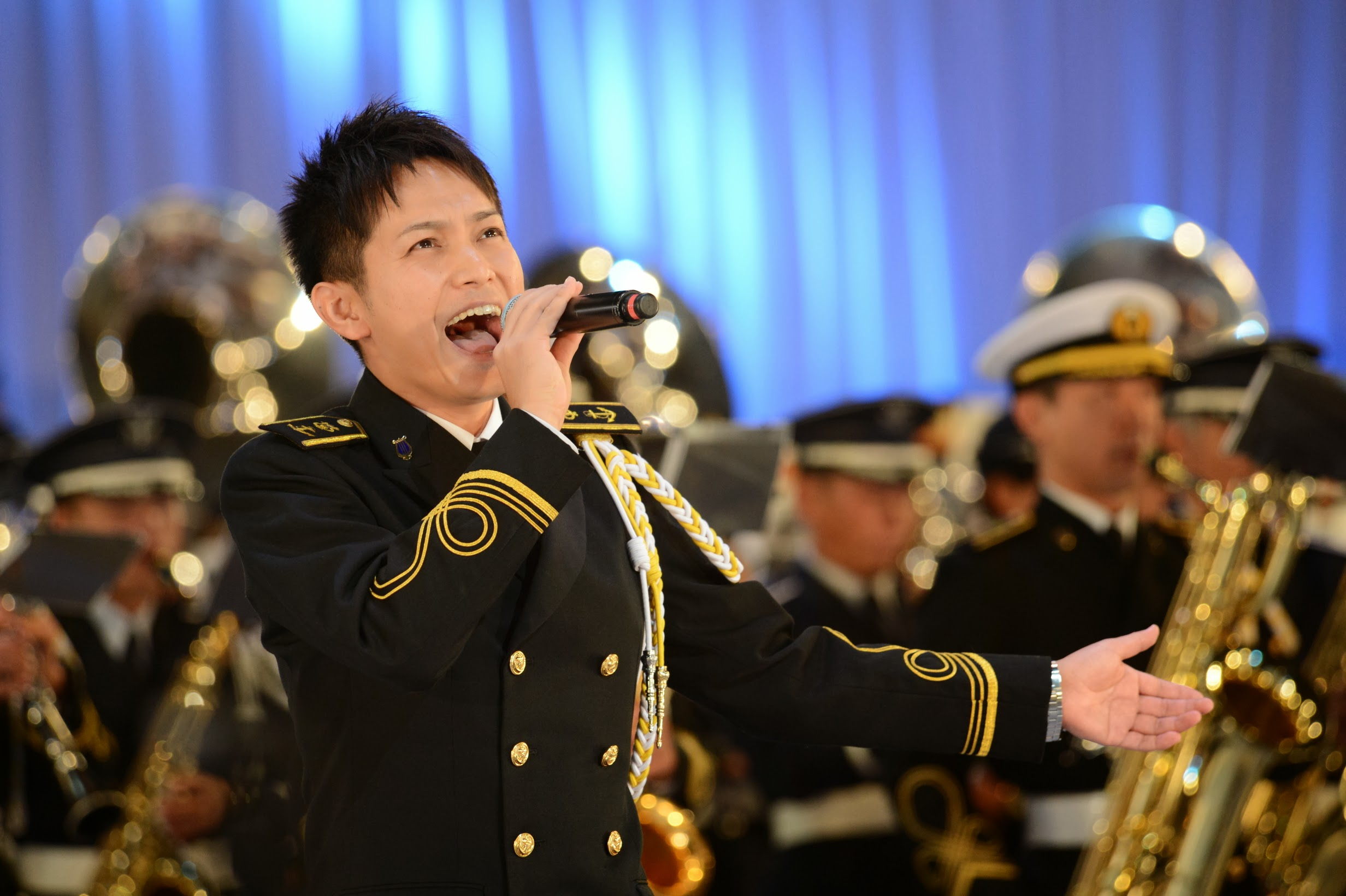
JMSDF military singer

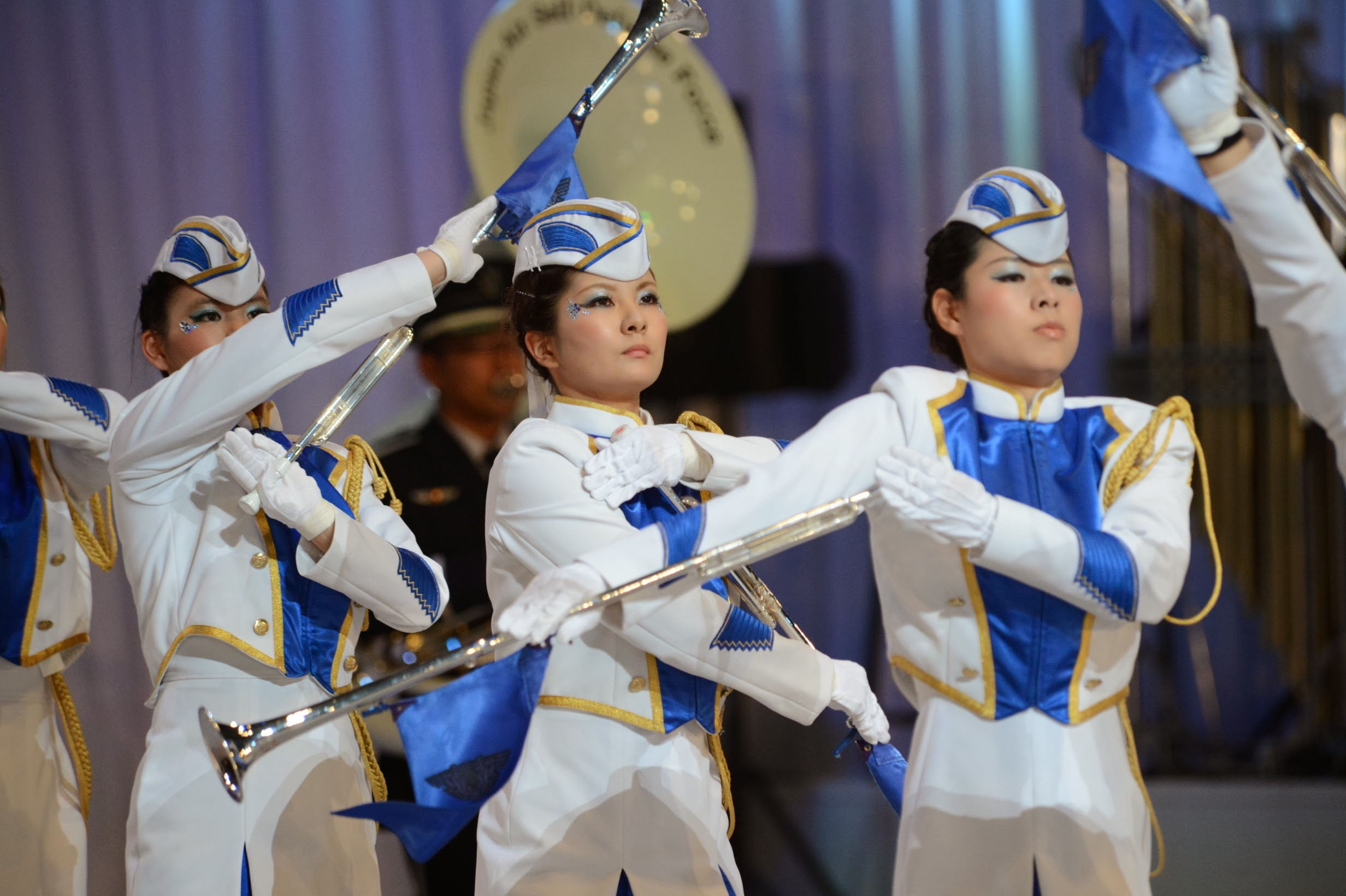
JASDF color guard

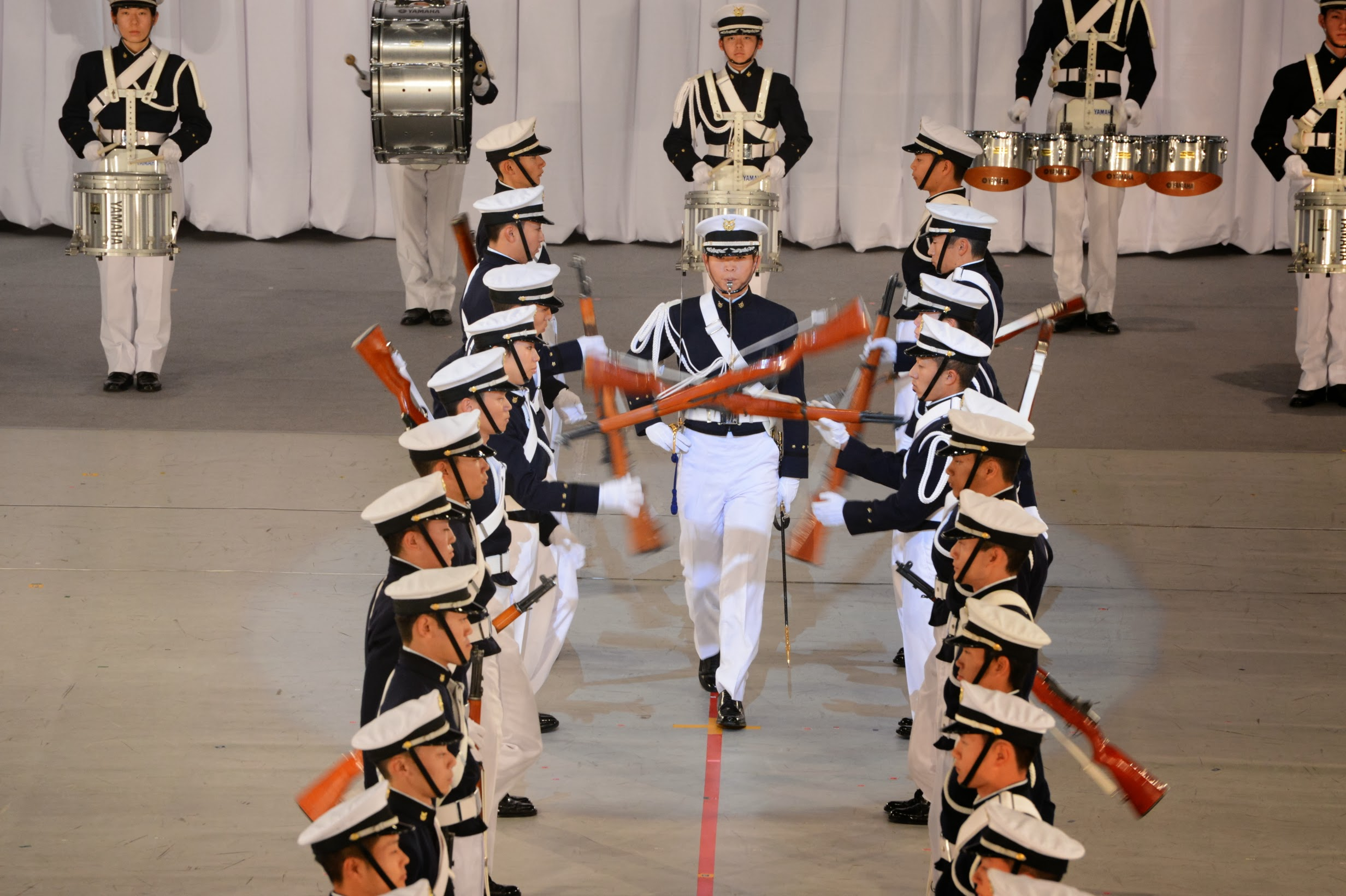
National Defense Academy Honor Guard

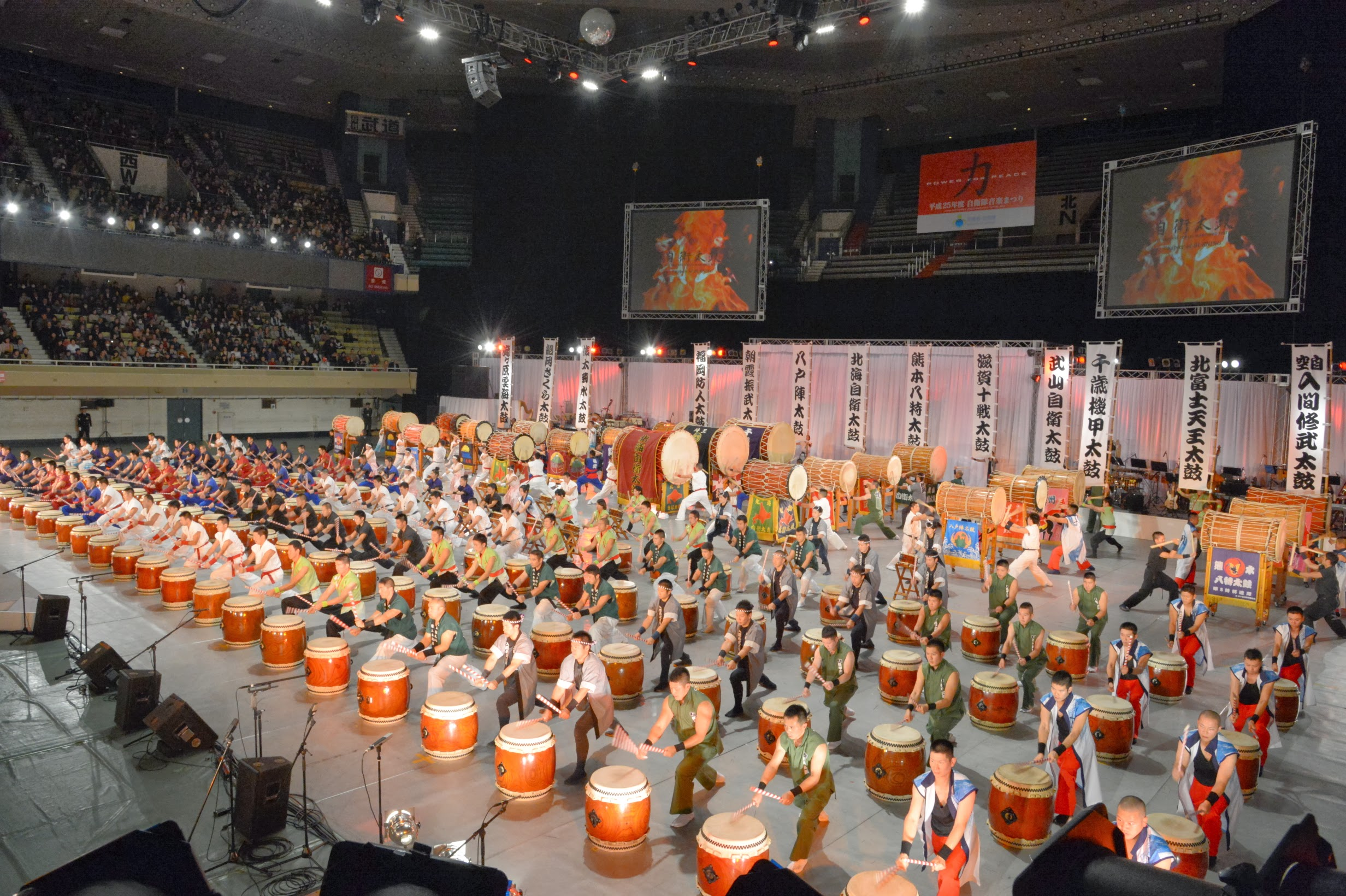
Taiko drumline

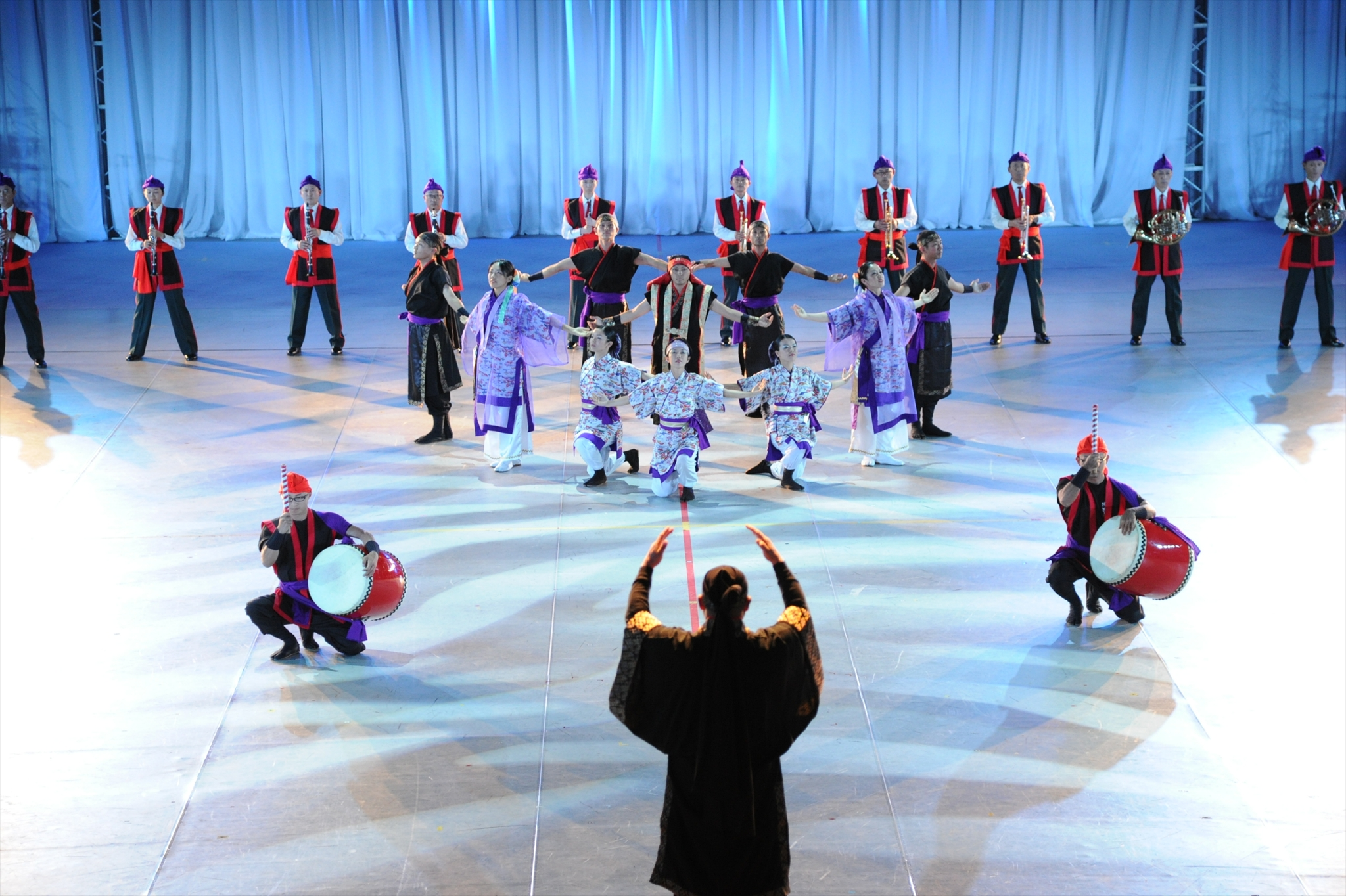
JGSDF 15th Brigade eisa corps

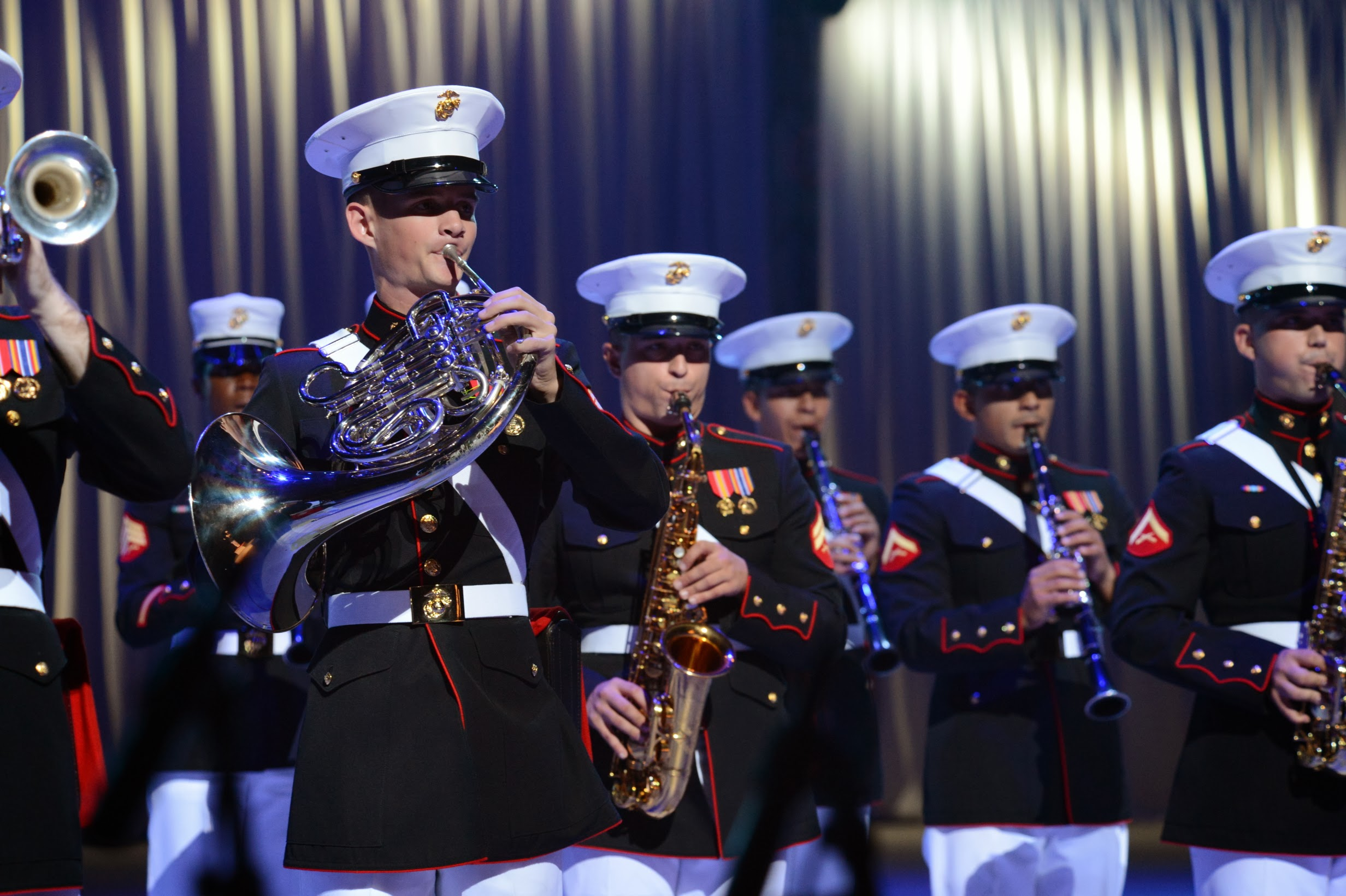
USMC III MEF Band
