= Singapore Armed Forces Band =

Military band from Singapore

Singapore Armed Forces Band (SAF Band)
- Emblem of the SAF Band
- Active: 1994 - present (current form)
- Country: Singapore
- Branch: Singapore Armed Forces
- Type: Military Band
- Nickname: SAF Band
- Motto: In Harmony
- Colours: White and Red

Commanders
- Commander, SAF Military Police Command: COL Low Puay Kng
- Senior Director of Music: ME6 Philip Tng Liat Peng
- Regimental Sergeant Major: ME3 Lim Wee Beng Gilbert

The Singapore Armed Forces Band (commonly known as the SAF Band) form the musical arm of the Singapore Armed Forces. Consisting of the flagship SAF Central Band, SAF Ceremonial Band and the National Youth Winds, the SAF Band provides musical support for key events such as the National Day Parade, SAF Day Parade, Passing Out Parades, Change of Command Parades and other military duties. Other than discharging ceremonial duties, the SAF Band also presents public concerts that aim to bring a wide range of music to the populace. They also seek to build up the band's music repertoire into an extensive array of styles and variety.

== History ==
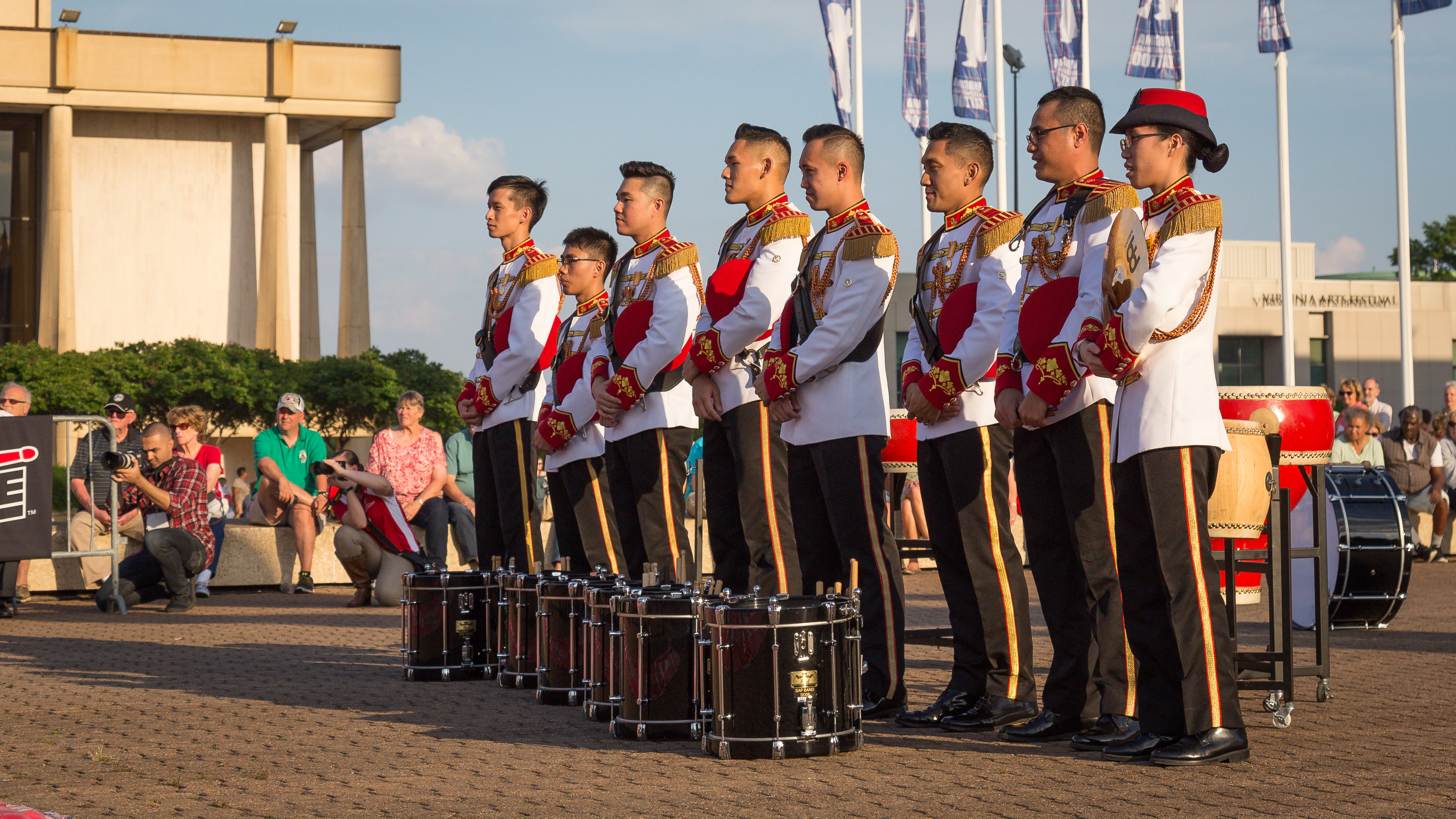
Members of the SAF Central Band at the Virginia International Tattoo in 2017.

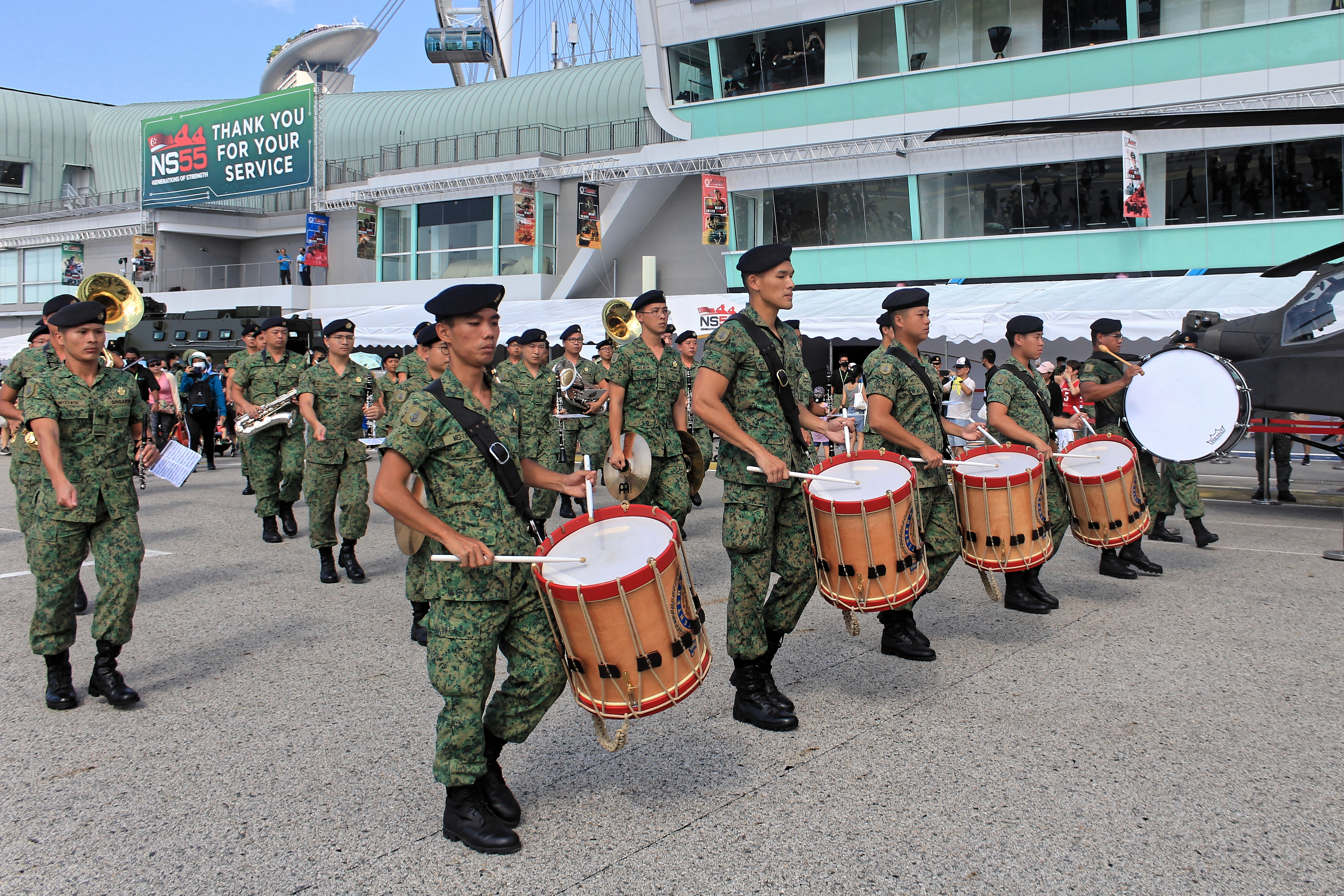
Members of the SAF Central Band at the Army Open House in 2022.

Singapore's military music would begin a year before it became self-governing. The formation of the Singapore Military Forces Staff Band on 1 June 1958 spelled the beginning of the nation's love affair with military bands. From this core group of 45 musicians would come five generations of military musicians from the country’s armed services.

WO1 Frederick Roy, the 15th/19th Hussars bandmaster became the first Director of Music of the SMFSB, a position he held until 1962. The band's main duty then was as musical support to the Singapore Infantry Regiment's activities. One of his young musicians, SSGT Abdullah Ahmad, was sent to the Royal Military School of Music for further training, later becoming a warrant officer upon graduating. The band's first composition, the Singapore Infantry Regiment March, later became the Singapore Army's official march.

Lt. Edward Crowcroft of the York and Northumberland Brigade Band succeeded WO1 Roy in September 1962 as Bandmaster and Director of Music. By November, it became the Singapore Infantry Regiment Band, and WO1 Arthur Edward Hollowell, DOM of the Band of the Parachute Brigade, replaced Lt. Crowcroft. He became a captain by the commission and led the band to its first overseas visit in 1964: the band's visit to Kuala Lumpur as part of the Independence Day Parade on 31 August that year.

A year after, WO1 Ahmad was appointed the Singapore Armed Forces Director of Music, becoming a lieutenant, and later as captain. He led the new SIR Band to the very first National Day Parade on the Padang the following year. By 1968, the band made its first recording under his direction. By that time now LTA Ahmad was also responsible for the Band of the People' Defence Force, the official band of the armed forces' volunteer component. After different names, the band was dissolved in 1974 and personnel were given to the other bands.

At the same time, the Band of the Singapore Armed Forces was formed, with joint headquarters with the SIR Band at HQ 1 Singapore Infantry Btn., Beach Road Camp. They both later moved to HQ 3 SIB at Ulu Pandan Camp and later at 5 SIB at Portsdown Camp, and by 1972, the latter band was led by a Republic of Singapore Police officer, WO1 Ervin Dragon.

By January the next year, a new band, the NSF (National Service-Full-time) Band, was formed at Telok Pagu Camp at Changi. WO2 Alan Teo became its first conductor.

May saw the first name change for the bands. They were renamed as

1. 3 Singapore Infantry Btn. Band, also known as the SIR Band
2. 4 Singapore Infantry Brigade. Band, also known as the Band of the Singapore Armoured Regiment
3. 2 Singapore Infantry Btn. Band

Alan Teo, by then a captain, left the DOM post at 2 SIB band by July that year, to join the then newly created SAF Music and Drama Company. Tonni Wei, then a sergeant and playing with one of the bands, was then studying at the Royal Military School of Music, graduating in October 1976 to become the bandmaster of 2 SIB Band, was commissioned as a second lieutenant (2LT)

In 1975, the 3 SIB Band soon moved to Jurong Camp, the 3rd Division headquarters.

In January 1977, Tonni Wei joined the MDC and Alan Teo returned to his old post. By February, 3 SIB Band became the SIR Band yet again, and Teo joined the now renamed Band of the Republic of Singapore Navy-the former 2 SIB Band-to Sembawang Camp and the RSN School of Naval Training. The SIR Band would later relocate itself at Jurong Camp that May. Peter Yan, then a musician sergeant with the army, and a part of the SIR Band, was then studying at Uxbridge at the RAF School of Music for Director of Music training. He graduated the next year and soon joined the RSN Band as its director.

CPT Ahmad retired from his post in May 1979.

In 1981, SGT Terry Seah Cheong Lock, who started his military music career earlier in 1975 with the Singapore Armoured Regiment Band, returned to Singapore from the UK after graduating from the Royal Air Force School of Music in England. He was commissioned as an officer upon his return, as well as being appointed the new Director of Music of SIR Band. CPT Terry Seah Cheong Lock led the band for 13 years, up to 1994.

As the 1980s progressed the public image of the bands was positive indeed, reinforced with increased participation of the service bands in the NDP and major military events such as the Open Houses as well as their concerts. By 1982, the SAR Band (4SIB Band) was soon relaunched as the Republic of Singapore Air Force Band, and would later move to Tengah Air Base. The SIR Band was also relaunched as the Singapore Army Band, but the band's new name and image never caught on. In 1986 the RSN Band welcomed its first lady musician. Their first appearance together in the NDP was in 1987's edition in the Padang conducted by the SAF's first Senior Director of Music MAJ Ervin Dragon, with another joint performance in 1990. 1988 saw the rebirth of the SAF Music Board and the formation of the SAF Symphonic Wind Band.

The SAF Band was formed in 1994 from men and women of the Singapore Infantry Regiment Band, Republic of Singapore Air Force Band and Republic of Singapore Navy Band. The formation of SAF Band come in a restructuring of the bands within the Ministry of Defence for more effective distribution of manpower. From 1994, the different bands within the SAF Band operated at different camps and locations. The SAF Central Band and SAF Band HQ(RSNB) were by the time of the merger in Tanglin Camp, Parade Band B (RSAFB) in Tengah Airbase and Parade Band A (SIRB) in Pasir Laba Camp, as they formerly represented the three branches of the SAF before their 1994 merger which resulted to these bands playing for the SAF at various events, including their participation in the National Day Parade as regular participants and arrival honours ceremonies at the Istana. These sections combined in November 2003 after the completion of renovations work to the 'White House', the former British Officers’ Mess in Nee Soon Camp.

In 2009, the Parade Bands were renamed as the SAF Ceremonial Band to reflect their duties more accurately.

== Logo ==
The logo of SAF Band is a combination of the three services within the armed forces. Light blue signifies the air division, red signifies the land division and deep blue signifies the sea division. They are all united within the lyre, which is a universal symbol of military musicians. The logo is topped with the National Coat of Arms which was launched on 3 December 1959 together with the National Flag and National Anthem at the installation of the Yang di-Pertuan Negara at the City Hall steps and adopted by government agencies nationwide. Below the logo is a banner inscribed with the Band's motto, "In Harmony". The logo was designed by MAJ Tonni Wei and SSG Goh Poh Wah.

== Structure of the SAF Band ==
SAF Band is the musical arm of the Singapore Armed Forces under the purview of the SAF Military Police Command. It comprises HQ SAF Band, the SAF Central Band, SAF Ceremonial Band and the National Youth Winds.

=== HQ SAF Band ===
HQ SAF Band is led by Senior Director of Music, ME6 Philip Tng and Regimental Sergeant Major, ME3 Gilbert Lim.

=== SAF Central Band ===
The Singapore Armed Forces (SAF) Central Band was formed during the merger of the tri-service bands in 1994 to serve as the nation's premier military band. Staffed by professional military musicians, the SAF Central Band is often seen at the Istana, performing for Presidential events and all State Welcome Ceremonies for visiting foreign dignitaries.

Recognised as one of the most prolific military bands in the world, the SAF Central Band has performed in numerous countries including Brunei, Canada, France, Germany, India, Japan, Malaysia, People's Republic of China, the Russian Federation, Scotland, South Korea, Sweden, Switzerland, Thailand and the United States of America.

On the domestic front, the SAF Central Band is an integral part of the annual National Day Parade. Through its popular "Chamber Repertory" and "In Harmony" concerts at the Esplanade Concert Hall, the SAF Central Band has collaborated with many notable conductors, composers, and instrumentalists including Alan McMuray, Douglas Bostock, Frank Ticheli, Evelyn Glennie, Jan Van der Roost, Toshio Akiyama, Yasuhide Ito, Eric Whitacre, Hardy Mertens, Philip Sparke, James Barnes, Steven Mead and Tsung Yeh.

In 2022, the SAF Central Band launched a successful National Education School Outreach Programme, where the band promotes National Education and Commitment to Defence through music at various secondary and tertiary institutions.

As musical ambassadors of Singapore and the Singapore Armed Forces (SAF), the SAF Central Band fosters close ties with both local and international audiences. The band represents the professionalism of the SAF and contributes to national morale during both peacetime and wartime. Through its international performances and engagement, it promotes goodwill, strengthens relations with foreign armed forces, and supports Singapore's defence diplomacy.

- Director of Music: ME5 Ignatius Wang Kebin
- Assistant Director of Music: ME4 Koh Kai Jie
- Honorary Guest Conductor: Douglas Bostock
- Drum Major: ME3 Chiu Boon Hwee
- Group Leaders: ME3 Tan Yuzuo Joe, ME3 Pee Jun Ming, ME2 Kenrick Quek, ME2 Teo Shao Ming
- Concertmaster: ME3 Ang Yi Xiang
- Principals: ME2 Jasper Goh (flute), ME3 Justin Chew (oboe), ME2 Tan Yue Yuan & ME2 Benjamin Wong (clarinet), ME3 Lewis Lim (horn), ME2 Vignesh Mohandasan (trumpet), ME3 Sebastian Koh (trombone & combo band), ME2 Kang Chun Meng (euphonium), ME2 Teng Siang Hong (tuba), ME2 Lim Xing Hong (percussion)
- Associate Principals: ME2 Zulhafeez (clarinet), ME2 Christopher Shen (horn), ME2 Jasper Tan (trombone), ME2 Shawn Yap (tuba), ME2 Brenson Yam (COD), ME2 Jonathan Lim (combo band)

=== SAF Ceremonial Band ===
Made up of Full-time National Servicemen (NSF) and Operationally-Ready National Servicemen (NSmen), the SAF Ceremonial Band supports the monthly Istana Changing of the Guards Ceremony, Officer Cadet School (OCS) Commissioning Parades, Guard of Honour (GOH) Parades for visiting dignitaries and other internal SAF ceremonies. The Ceremonial Band continues the heritage of the bands of the Singapore Infantry Regiment and the Republic of Singapore Air Force.

- Director of Music: *vacant*
- Assistant Director of Music: ME3 Chiu Boon Hwee
- Drum Major: ME2 Winston Goh

=== National Youth Winds ===
Founded in 2009 to promote youth talent and fostering musical excellence, the National Youth Winds (NYW) was re-established in 2024. The NYW planned to identify and groom talented Singaporean musicians aged 15–25. Members are provided with opportunities to learn from and perform alongside musician-mentors from the SAF Central Band

In collaboration with the Band Directors Association (Singapore), NYW gave their debut performance at the Festival Winds Gala Concert on 15 December 2024 at the School of the Arts Concert Hall.

The combined clarinet sections of NYW and the SAF Central Band then performed on 1 February 2025 at the Esplanade Concourse. As part of Band Weekend, they played tunes from jazz, ballet, and musical theatre classics. It also perform tunes by local arrangers and composers, highlighting their contributions to classical music in Singapore.

== Key Appointment Holders ==
- Senior Director of Music: ME6 Philip Tng Liat Peng
- Director of Music, SAF Central Band: ME5 Ignatius Wang Kebin
- Assistant Director of Music, SAF Central Band: ME4 Koh Kai Jie
- Assistant Director of Music, SAF Ceremonial Band & Hd Operations Support Branch: ME3 Chiu Boon Hwee
- Regimental Sergeant Major: ME3 Lim Wee Beng Gilbert

== Ceremonies and parades ==
- Change of Guards (COG) Ceremony: Together with the new guards from SAF Military Police (MP) command, the band marches down Orchard Road to Istana for the ceremony which involves a public performance by the Silent Precision Drill Squad (SPDS).
- Presentation of Credentials (POC) Parade: Held in Istana to welcome Foreign Dignitaries
- Guard of Honour (GOH) Parade: Held in Ministry of Defence (MINDEF), Ministry of Foreign Affairs (MFA), or Parliament House to welcome Foreign Dignitaries
- Change of Command (COC) Parade: Held to commemorate the official transfer of authority and responsibility for a unit from a commanding officer to another.
- Basic Military Training Centre (BMTC) Passing Out Parade: Held in Floating Platform @ Marina Bay, Pasir Laba Camp and the Singapore Sports Hub
- Specialist Cadet Graduation Parade (SCGP): Held in Pasir Laba Camp Leaders Square
- Officer Cadet School (OCS) Commissioning Parade: Held in SAFTI Military Institute (MI)
- Singapore Armed Forces (SAF) Day: Held in SAFTI MI, the main objective of this day is for the members of the armed forces to reaffirm their pledge of loyalty and dedication to the SAF and the nation.
- National Day Parade (NDP): The band is actively involved in the annual event in commemoration of Singapore's independence since 1965.
- Other Special Deployments: Military Tattoos, Anniversary Parades, Trooping of Colours, Openings of Military Exercises, Military Funerals

== Performances ==
The SAF Band had also represented Singapore at international music festivals. These include:

- 2000 – the Toowoomba Carnival of Flowers street parade in Australia;
- 2001 – the Festival International de Musiques Militaires in Saumur, France;
- 2002 – the Kuala Lumpur International Tattoo in Malaysia;
- 2006 – the Brunei International Tattoo in Bandar Seri Begawan, Brunei Darussalam; the Wonju Tattoo in South Korea;
- 2007 – the India Tattoo in New Delhi; the Kuala Lumpur International Tattoo in Malaysia;
- 2008 – the Quebec International Tattoo in Canada;
- 2009 – the Nanchang Tattoo in China;
- 2010 – the Japan Self-Defense Force Tattoo in Tokyo, Japan;
- 2011 – the Bremen International Tattoo in Germany; the Brunei International Tattoo in Bandar Seri Begawan, Brunei Darussalam;
- 2012 – the Spasskaya International Tattoo in Moscow, Russia;
- 2013 – the Malmö Tattoo in Sweden;
- 2014 – the Basel Tattoo in Switzerland; the Royal Edinburgh Military Tattoo in Scotland; the Kuala Lumpur International Tattoo in Malaysia;
- 2016 – the Amur Waves International Military Tattoo in Khabarovsk, Russia;
- 2017 – the Virginia International Tattoo in Virginia, United States of America;
- 2018 – the Japan Self-Defense Forces Marching Festival in Tokyo, Japan;
- 2019 – the Nanchang International Military Tattoo in Nanchang, China;
- 2023 – the Virginia International Tattoo in Virginia and PCII 30th Anniversary Engagement Concerts, United States of America;
- 2024 – the 6th Musikfest der Bundeswehr in Düsseldorf, and public concerts in Xanten and Hagen, Germany

== SAF Ceremonial Music ==
=== Salutes ===
Title	Event	Composer / arranger
President Fanfare	Presidential Fanfare	Tonni Wei Shi Ren
PM Fanfare	Prime Minister Fanfare	Johnson Lee Kah Hee
Salute No.1	Head of State Salute	Tonni Wei Shi Ren
Salute No.2	Prime Minister Salute	Tonni Wei Shi Ren
Salute No.3	Minister Salute	Peter Yan Pei Tuck
Salute No.4	Chief of Defence Salute	Ervin Edmund Dragon
Salute No.5	Service Chief Salute	Terry Seah Cheong Lock
Salute No.6	Reviewing Officer Salute – Military reviewing officer of general rank including foreign ambassadors	Tonni Wei Shi Ren
Salute No.7	SAF Salute – Senior military officers of colonel rank and below	A. Abdullah Sumardi
NS 45 Salute	Used in NDP 2012 to pay tribute to national servicemen of the past and present	Johnson Lee Kah Hee
Advance in Review Order	OCS Commissioning, Milestone Parade	Chua Siong Loo

=== Slow Marches ===
Title	Event	Composer / Arranger
First and Foremost	Various Parades	
Honour and Glory	Various Parades, SAF Commando Formation, Trooping of Colors	Tonni Wei Shi Ren
Pride, Discipline and Honour	Various Parades, SAF Military Police Command, Trooping of Colors	Johnson Lee Kah Hee
Standing Victorious	Various Parades, Trooping of Colors	Tonni Wei Shi Ren

=== Quick Marches ===
Title	Unit	Composer / Arranger
Tentera Singapura	Singapore Armed Forces	A. Abdullah Sumardi
Republic of Singapore Air Force (RSAF) March	Singapore Air Force	Ervin Edmund Dragon
Republic of Singapore Navy (RSN) March	Singapore Navy	Alan Teo Chwee Lye
Singapore Infantry Regiment (SIR) March	Singapore Army	Frederick William Roy
The Digital and Intelligence Service (DIS) March	Digital and Intelligence Service	ME2 Dax Wilson Liang
Marching with Pride	Tri-Service	Ervin Edmund Dragon
Upwards and Onwards	Singapore Navy	Arranged by Peter Yan Pei Tuck; Edited by Muhammad Yusri
Bandstand	SAF Band	Tonni Wei Shi Ren
Bergerak	SAF Combat Engineers	A. Abdullah Sumardi
Berjuang	SAF Signals	A. Abdullah Sumardi
The Pride of Armour	SAF Armour Formation	Ervin Edmund Dragon
Marching with the Guards	SAF Guards Formation	Ervin Edmund Dragon
Guard of Honour March	GOH Contingents	Tonni Wei Shi Ren
Pride of Our Nation		Arranged by Tonni Wei Shi Ren; Edited by Philip Tng Liat Peng
Singapore Artillery Centenary March	Singapore Artillery	Tsao Chieh
Spot On	SAF Military Police Command	Ervin Edmund Dragon
The Commandos	SAF Commando Formation	A. Abdullah Sumardi; Arranged and Edited by Johnson Lee Kah Hee
The Logisticians	SAF Logistics	-
We are One	Singapore Infantry	Music and Lyrics by Yeo Kai Loon; Arranged by Tan Aik Kee Ken Steven
We are One	Singapore Infantry	Music and Lyrics by Yeo Kai Loon; Arranged by Tonni Wei Shi Ren; Edited by Philip Tng Liat Peng
We are One 128	Singapore Infantry	Music and Lyrics by Yeo Kai Loon; Arranged by Johnson Lee Kah Hee
We are Ready	National Cadet Corps	Arranged by Tonni Wei Shi Ren

=== Ceremonial Music ===
Title	Event	Composer / Arranger
Majulah Singapura	SCGP POP, OCS Commissioning, SAF Day, NDP	Music by Zubir Said; Arranged by Phoon Yew Tien; Transcribed by Philip Tng Liat Peng
A Nation's March	NDP 2012	Syawaludin Kassim
A Triumphant Spirit	Various NDPs	Syawaludin Kassim
Auld Lang Syne	Passing out parades, OCS Commissioning, ORD parades	Traditional
For The People for the Nation	Various Parades	Johnson Lee Kah Hee
Jubilation	Various Parades	
March of the Blue Berets	Various Parades	Johnson Lee Kah Hee
Munneru Valiba	OCS Commissioning	Traditional
Negara Kita	OCS Commissioning	Terry Seah Cheong Lock
Officer of The Day	COG Ceremony	Robert Browne Hall; Arranged by Norman Richardson
One in Unity	NDP 2013	Johnson Lee Kah Hee, Joshua Low
Our Country Our Home	NDP 2014	Johnson Lee Kah Hee, Joshua Low
Point of War	National Day Parade, SAF Day	Traditional
Reach Out for the Skies	Various Parades	Johnson Lee Kah Hee
Salute to the Nation	NDP 1994, 1997, 2001, 2002, 2004, 2011, 2019	-
To Mount with Loyalty	Various Parades	Tan Aik Kee Ken Steven
Training To Be Soldiers	BMTC POP	Arranged by Sin Jin How
Trust Me Singapore	OCS Commissioning	Ervin Edmund Dragon
Untuk Rakyat Dan Negara	SAF Day	Arranged by Terry Seah Cheong Lock
We Are Singapore		Tan Aik Kee Ken Steven
We The People of Singapore / Our Homeland	NDP 2013, 2014, 2016, 2018	Johnson Lee Kah Hee
Will You?	Various Parades	Music and Lyrics by Jimmy Ye; Johnson Lee Kah Hee
Dead March from Saul	Military Funerals	George Frideric Handel; Arranged by J. Hartmann
Laid to Rest	Military Funerals	Johnson Lee Kah Hee
Of Legacy and Valour	SAF Day 2023, 2025	Lee Jinjun

=== SAF Songs ===
Title	Event	Composer / Arranger
The SAF Dream	Various Parades	Music & Lyrics by ME2 Dax Wilson Liang
APGCians Marching On	Air Power Generation Command (APGC)	Lyrics by MAJ Chan Chin Ann; ME4 Johnson Lee Kah Hee
Officer Cadet School Song	Officer Cadet School	Arranged by Tan Yan Zhang
Sons of The Sea	Republic of Singapore Navy	-
The Medics of The Field	SAF Medical Corps	Lyrics by Dr Cheong San Than; Dr Koh Eng Kheng
With Pride We Lead	Specialist Cadet School	Johnson Lee Kah Hee
