= Goh Soon Tioe =

Indonesian conductor, violinist and teacher (1911–1982)

Goh Soon Tioe 吳順籌

Background information
- Born: 18 October 1911; Padang, West Sumatra, Dutch East Indies (now Indonesia)
- Died: 27 February 1982 (aged 70) Singapore
- Genre: Classical
- Occupations: Conductor, pedagogue, violinist
- Instrument: Violin
- Years active: 1947–1976

Goh Soon Tioe (Chinese: 吳順籌; pinyin: Wú Shùnchóu) is known in Singapore musical history as a key player in the development of classical music for the post-war Singapore. He is also the father of Singaporean violinist-conductor Vivien Goh.

== Early life and education ==
Born on 18 October 1911 in Padang, Indonesia, Goh was the tenth of the eleven children in the family. His father Gho Goan Tee owned a trading firm and was a local Kapitan – a spokesperson for the Padang Chinese community and a representative for the Chinese government. Mother Lie Kie Pat was from Nias and was of mixed Chinese and native parentage. They live in house on Batipoeh-Straat (now known as Jalan Pasar Batipuh), Kampoeng-Tjina in Padang.

The elder Gho died when Goh was three years old, leaving him in the care of his mother and Goh's older siblings. As a boy, Goh studied in the local town school and primarily taught in Dutch language. But he was active and mischievous child who often played truant from school and indulge in cock fighting. His strict disciplinarian mum would often punish him for playing truant – at one time she even put a ball and chain on the boy's leg, and sent him to school in a horse carriage, or a Bendi.

It came to the point that his mother felt she could not control him any longer, and thus sent him and other relatives to Singapore. Goh was 13 years old then, living with his 2nd eldest brother Soon Ho in Newton Road and continued his schooling at the Anglo-Chinese School. The year was 1924.

== Musical career ==
=== Interest ===
Goh's family members were musically-inclined. In his home in Padang, there was a piano left behind from his grandfather's time. And not to mention that Goh Soon Hin, his third elder brother also played the violin. But in all his childhood years the young Goh had never expressed any interest in music at all. And thus his passion for music started relatively late and by chance.

It was the time when he moved to Singapore, he would hear his cook's son playing the violin at the back of their Newton house every night. That got the 17-year-old Goh interested in the violin, and embarked his musical journey with the violin with his first teacher, Filipino violinist Aguedo Raquiza. Raquiza taught all that he knew to his prodigy, and advised him to seek further instruction overseas. Despite his newfound love and conviction to become a great violinist, he could not convince his family to let him study music overseas. Instead, he was sent to work in their family business. But music still was never far from his mind.

=== Training ===
In 1932, Goh received an opportunity to audition for a recruitment by the Conservatoire de Musique de Genève in Switzerland. Goh failed the audition and was not accepted. He then started taking lessons from Maggy Breittmayer who taught him hard and polished his technique. He pushed himself harder practising 8–10 hours a day for the next 6 months. At the next audition, Goh was accepted and was admitted to the Superiere level of study. One of the audition panelists, a Swiss pianist, helped convince Goh's family members to allow him to study music and develop his talent at the Conservatoire. In the three years of music study with the Conservatoire, he was trained by Breittmayer and Oscar Studer, even took classes in solfege, harmony and chamber music as well. Goh performed excellently in all his annual exams, receiving the Premier Prix distinction award consecutively for three years. Goh even played with the Conservatoire Orchestra under Samuel Baud-Bovy.
He had also made new friends during his years in Switzerland – with father-son violin makers Alfred and Pierre Vidoudez, and American-Italian violinist Joseph Nardulli. Pierre helped him to correct his violin technique, and taught him the French language.

In 1935, Goh's family was unable to support him in his music education and urged him to return to Sumatra to teach music instead. By August, Goh's finances dried up. Alfred Vidoudez introduced Goh to Spanish guitarist Andrés Segovia who was so impressed with Goh's musical talent that he offered Goh guitar lessons free of charge in Barcelona. Goh left Geneva for Barcelona in December, and was further introduced to Spanish violinist Francisco Costa by Segovia who offered Goh to stay, and learn the violin from him in his home in Calle Muntaner. Goh left Barcelona when the Spanish Civil War started in July 1936. As a parting gift, Segovia gave him a Rudolfo Cauracho guitar.

Goh arrived in Brussels and went to seek Alfred Marchot at the Royal Academy of Music with a letter of introduction written by Costa earlier. Marchot was impressed with Goh's earnestness and his talent, and was willing to teach Goh for free. The prolonged hunger pangs, malnutrition and stress caused by the lack of food brought about a paralysis in three fingers of his left hand, killing his hopes of playing the violin ever again. Goh fell into the trenches of despair, but Marchot was happy to teach him the aesthetics of music until his death in July 1939. After eight years in Europe, Goh finally saw that it was pointless to continue staying in Europe, and returned home in Padang with a heavy heart in September that year.

=== Singapore ===
Goh moved to Singapore and in 1940, he established a music studio above a garage in Oldham Lane in Singapore, and gave music and French language lessons. The business closed shortly in 1942 due to Japanese occupation of Singapore during World War II. Goh was rounded up along with his friends and other able-bodied men by the Japanese and was made to stand under the sun for three days. When one of his friends was allowed to leave, his friend was given a choice to choose another person to leave with him and Goh was chosen. While the two of them left, the rest of the group were sent to the firing squad the next day.

Goh went on to have a successful musical career as a Conductor of the Singapore Youth Symphony Orchestra between 1971 and 1975, as well as founding the Goh Soon Tioe String Orchestra. As a teacher, he instructed some of Singapore's well known musical prodigies, including Dick Lee, Lynnette Seah, Kam Kee Yong, Seow Yit Kin, Melvyn Tan, Choo Hoey, violinist Lee Pan Hon, and Lim Soon Lee, Music Director/ Resident Conductor of the National University of Singapore Concert Orchestra.

== Honours ==
Goh was awarded Pingat Jasa Gemilang (Meritorious Service Medal) for his immense achievements and contributions to the Singapore society.

== Death ==
Goh died in 1982.
