= Mitsubishi Type 89 IFV =

Japanese infantry fighting vehicle

Mitsubishi Type 89
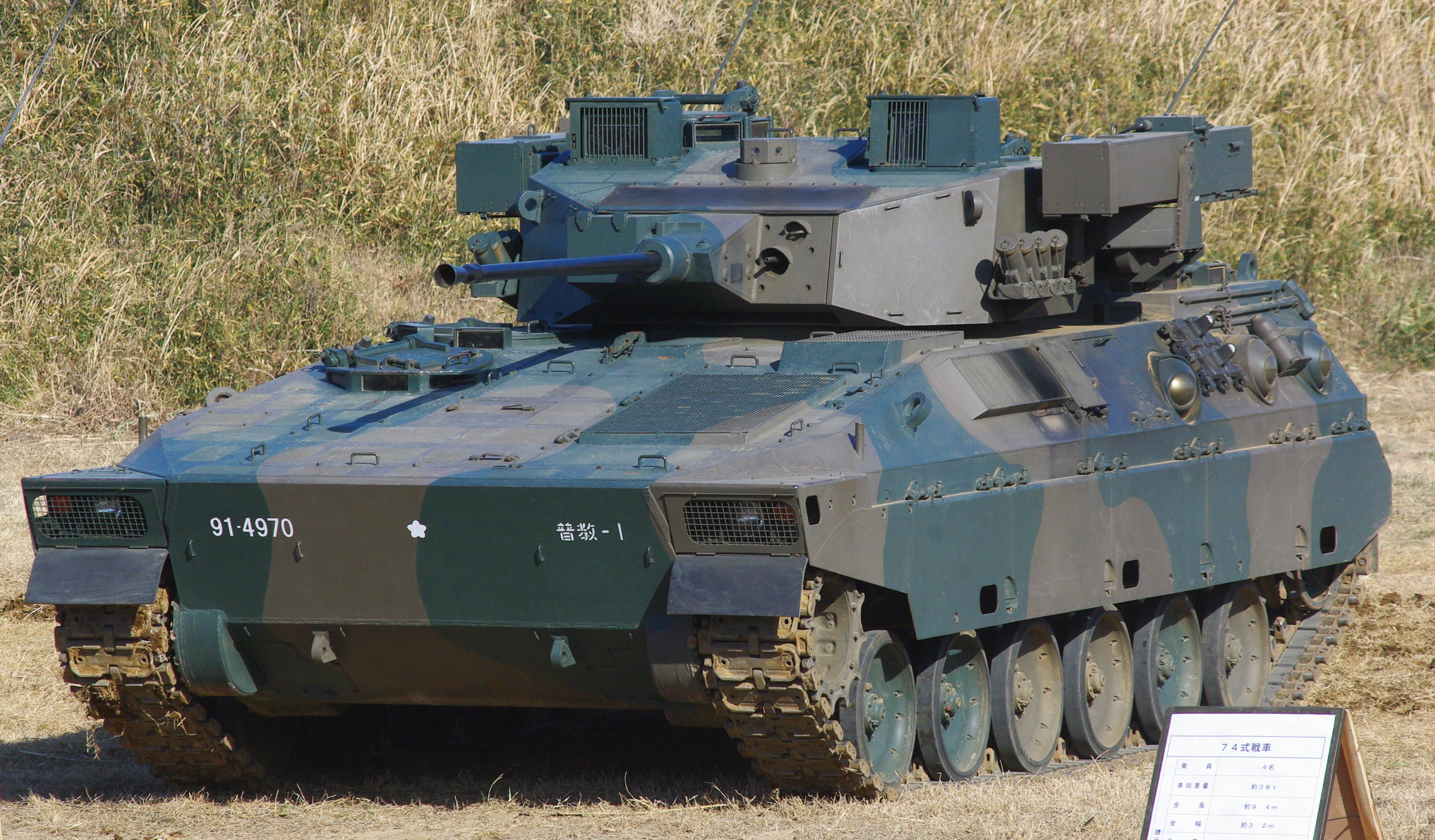
- A Type 89 infantry fighting vehicle exhibited in Narashino.
- Type: Infantry fighting vehicle
- Place of origin: Japan

Service history
- In service: 1989–…
- Used by: Japan Ground Self-Defense Force

Production history
- Designer: Technical Research and Development Institute
- Designed: 1984–1989
- Manufacturer: Mitsubishi Heavy Industries (hull), Japan Steel Works (gun), Kawasaki Heavy Industries (missile launchers)
- Unit cost: ¥700 million
- Produced: 1989–2004
- No. built: 68

Specifications
- Mass: 26.5 t (26.1 long tons; 29.2 short tons)
- Length: 6.80 m (22.3 ft)
- Barrel length: 3.15 m (10.3 ft) (90 calibres)
- Width: 3.20 m (10.5 ft)
- Height: 2.50 m (8 ft 2 in)
- Crew: 3 (commander, driver, gunner)
- Passengers: 7
- Cartridge: 35×228 mm
- Caliber: 35 mm (1.4 in)
- Rate of fire: 200 rpm
- Armor: Rolled homogeneous armour
- Main armament: Oerlikon 35 mm KDE autocannon
- Secondary armament: 2×Type 79 Jyu-MAT missile launchers, 7.62 mm Type 74 coaxial machine gun
- Engine: Mitsubishi 6SY31WA 4-stroke I6 liquid-cooled turbocharged diesel 600 hp (450 kW) (2,100 rpm)
- Power/weight: 22.64 hp/t (16.88 kW/t)
- Suspension: Torsion bar
- Operational range: 400 km (250 mi)
- Maximum speed: 70 km/h (43 mph)

The Mitsubishi Type 89 (三菱89式装甲戦闘車, Mitsubishi 89-shiki sōkō-sentō-sha) is a Japanese infantry fighting vehicle. Using a chassis manufactured by Mitsubishi Heavy Industries, the vehicle mounts an Oerlikon 35 mm KDE autocannon produced under licence by Japan Steel Works and two Type 79 Jyu-MAT anti-tank missile launchers. The Type 89 entered service with the Japan Ground Self-Defense Force in 1989, although only 68 units had been built by the end of the production in 2004 due to its high procurement cost. An abbreviated designation of the vehicle is 89FV and the Type 89 has a nickname Light Tiger.

== Development ==
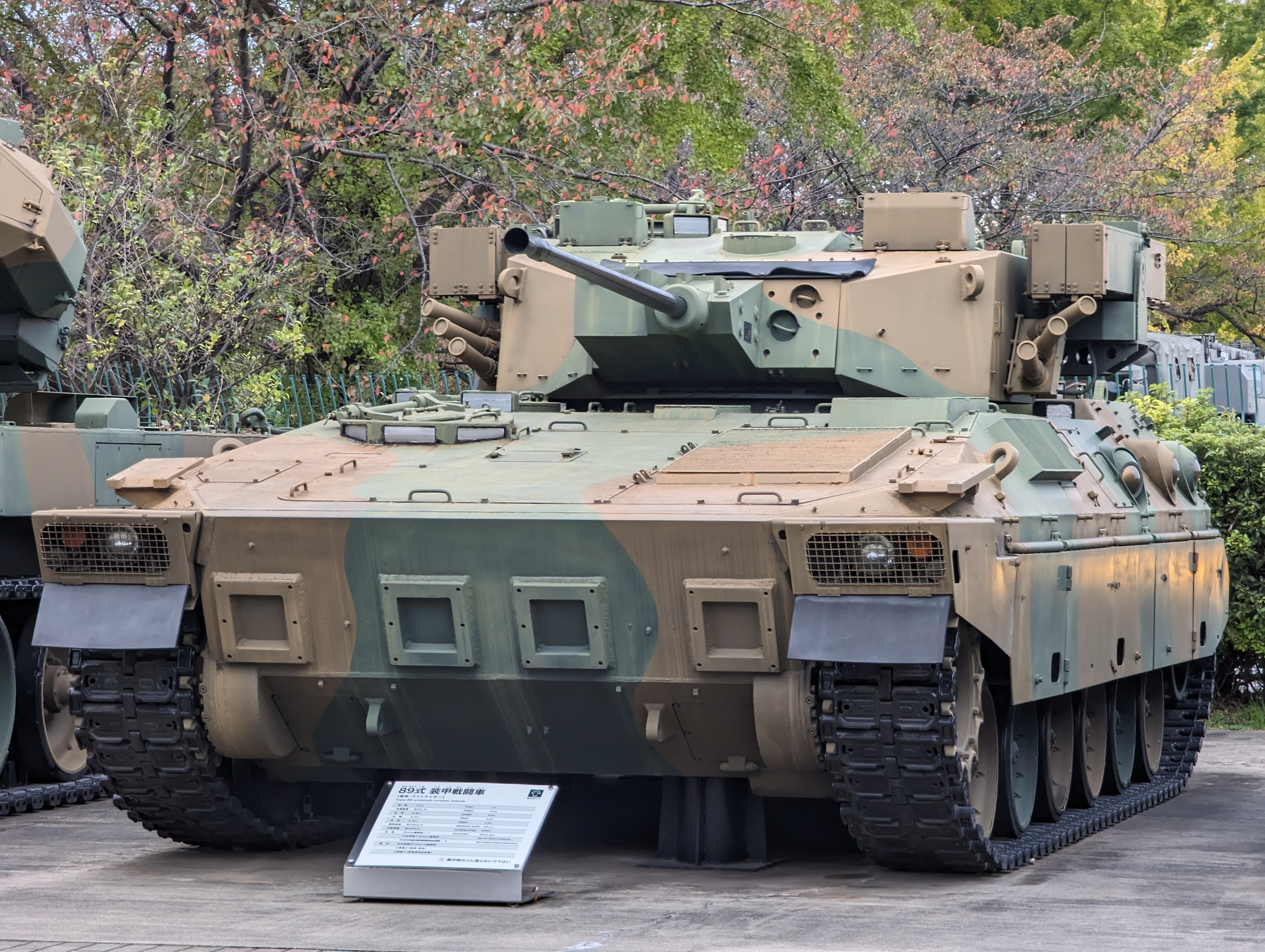
A prototype Type 89 infantry fighting vehicle with mounting points for a mine roller at the Japan Ground Self-Defense Force Public Information Center.

Development of the Type 89 began in 1980, with its first prototype completed in 1984. The prototype underwent technical testing until 1986. After that, practical testing commended until the Type 89 was accepted into service and type classified in 1989.

The Japan Ground Self-Defense Force's initial requirement was for around 300 vehicles. However, the Type 89's high procurement cost led to low annual production numbers. Between the start of the production in 1989 and its end in 2004, 68 vehicles had been built. Most of the manufacturing work on the Type 89 was carried out by Mitsubishi Heavy Industries, Japan Steel Works produced the gun under licence from Oerlikon Contraves, and Kawasaki Heavy Industries built the missile launchers.

Compared to the preceding Type 73 armoured personnel carrier, the Type 89 has greater protection due to its steel armour as opposed to aluminium used in the Type 73's armour. The Type 89 is also twice as heavy as the Type 73, meaning it is not amphibious. Unlike the Type 73, the Type 89 has night vision equipment. Both vehicles have protection against nuclear, biological, and chemical threats.

== Design ==
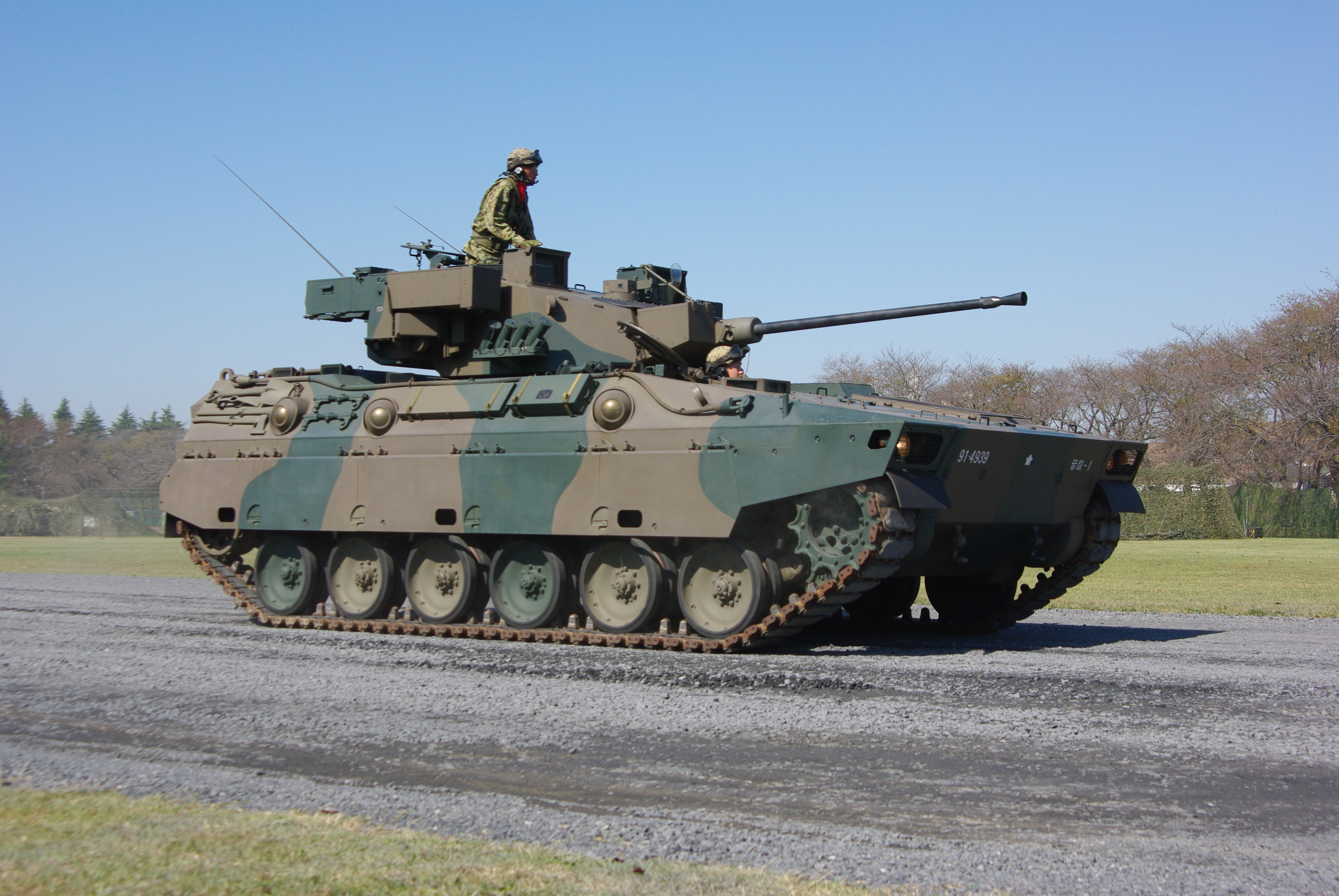
A Type 89 with its characteristic firing ports clearly visible.

The Type 89 has a relatively conventional design with a hull welded from rolled homogeneous armour steel plates. The 600 hp (450 kW) Mitsubishi 6SY31WA liquid-cooled diesel engine located in the front left of the hull drives an automatic transmission, which drives the track via drive sprockets at the front of the hull. On each side of the hull are six road wheels with an idler at the rear, and three track return rollers. The suspension is a torsion bar system.

The driver sits to the right of the engine, with a single-piece hatch above them that opens to the right. The driver is provided with three fixed vision periscopes, and a single traversable periscope in the hatch. A passive night vision periscope can be used in place of one of the day periscopes. A single dismount sits behind the driver and has a hatch immediately above them with two vision periscopes that provide coverage of the front of the hull, as well as a large spherical firing port on the right side of the hull.

In the centre of the hull is the two-man turret, which mounts Oerlikon's 35 mm KDE 90-calibre dual-feed autocannon built under licence by Japan Steel Works. The gun has a cyclic rate of fire of approximately 200 rounds per minute and 251 rounds available. Coaxially mounted to the autocannon is a 7.62 mm Type 74 machine gun with 2,000 rounds of ammunition. The turret also mounts a single Type 79 Jyu-MAT missile launcher on each side of the turret with a reload for both launchers (four missiles in total). Underneath the missile launcher on each side is an array of four smoke grenade launchers.

The gunner sits on the left of the turret, with the commander to their right with hatches that open to the rear. Both are provided with telescopic sights mounted on the front of the turret. The gunner has two vision periscopes that cover the front and left of the turret. The commander has six periscopes that provide all-round coverage. The turret is also fitted with a laser warning system.

At the rear of the hull is the main troop compartment that seats six infantrymen. The troops enter through two large rear doors which swing open to the side. The troop compartment has seven firing ports: three on the left, one of the right rear exit door, three on the right side. Each of the firing ports is provided with a vision periscope mounted above it.

== Variants ==
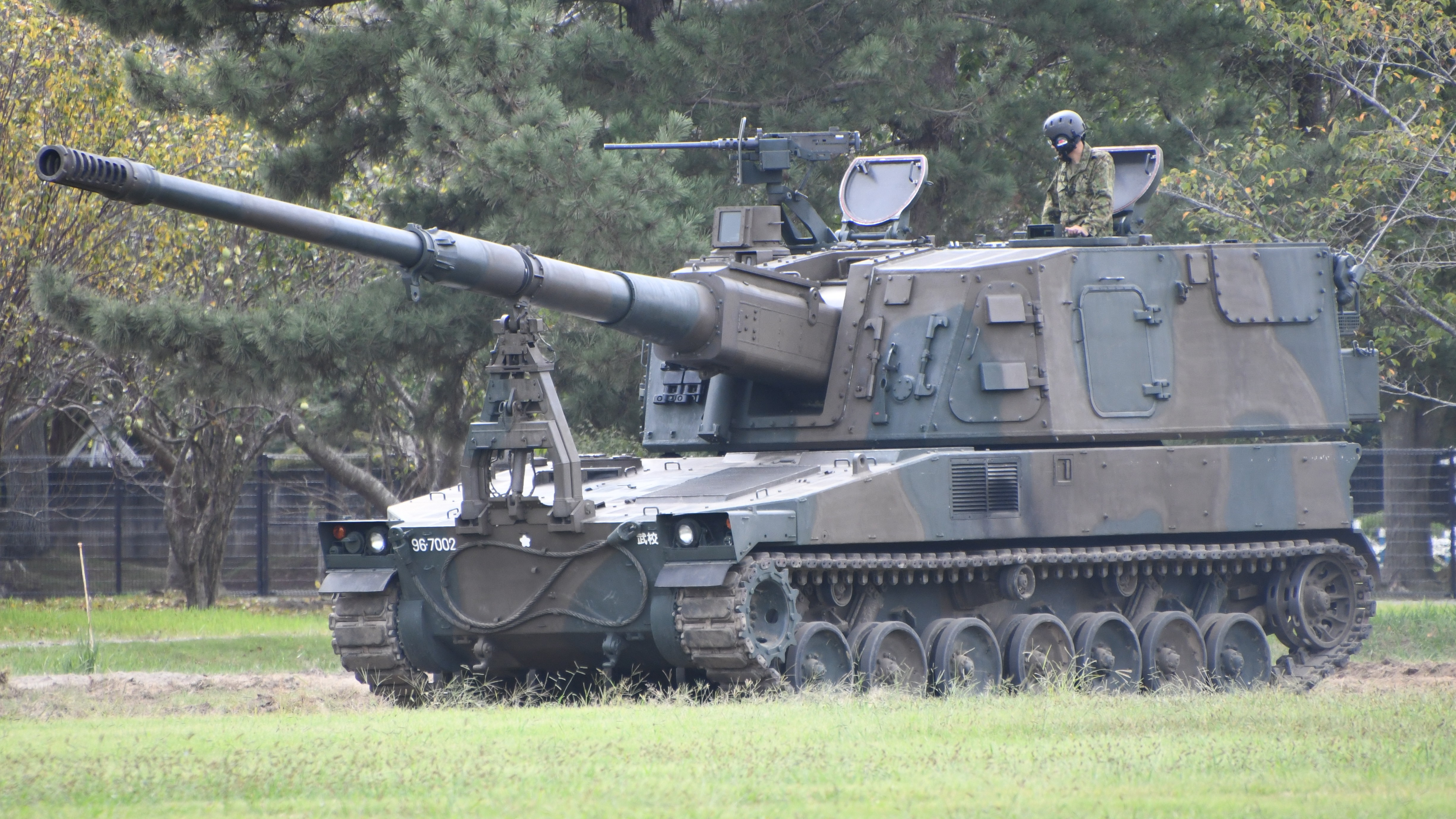
The Type 99 155 mm self-propelled howitzer uses a modified Type 89 chassis.

The Type 89 hull was used by as the basis for the Type 99 155 mm self-propelled howitzer introduced in 1999. Major automotive components including the engine were kept, but the chassis was lengthened by one road wheel on each side to accommodate the extra weight of the heavy artillery piece and its large turret. To accommodate the turret, the hull side armour of the Type 99 is vertical as opposed to the sloped side armour of the Type 89.

Mitsubishi revealed a render of a concept vehicle based on the Type 89 at the DSEI Japan 2025 exhibition. The concept proposes converting the Type 89 into an unmanned ground vehicle. The most significant elements of the modernisation proposal are a new unmanned turret with a 30 mm autocannon and eight Switchblade 600 loitering munition launchers in place of the troop compartment.

== Operators ==
A Type 89 firing its 35 mm autocannon during annual live fire exercises in the East Fuji Maneuver Area.

Japan

- Japan Ground Self-Defense Force
  - Ordnance School
  - Fuji School
    - Fuji School (Combined Training) Brigade
      - Infantry School Regiment (Mechanized)
  - Northern Army
    - 7th Division
      - 11th Infantry Regiment (Mechanized)
    - Northern Army Combined Brigade
      - 1st Sergeant Training Unit

== Similar vehicles ==
- ASCOD – (Spain, Austria)
- Bionix – (Singapore)
- BMP-2 – (Soviet Union)
- BMP-3 – (Soviet Union, Russia)
- BMP-23 – (Bulgaria)
- BVP M-80 – (Yugoslavia)
- CV90 – (Sweden)
- Dardo – (Italy)
- M2 Bradley – (United States)
- MLI-84 – (Socialist Republic of Romania)
- Type 86 – (China)
- Warrior – (United Kingdom)
- ZBD-04 – (China)

== See also ==
- List of infantry fighting vehicles
