= Type 90 tank =

Japanese main battle tank

Type 90
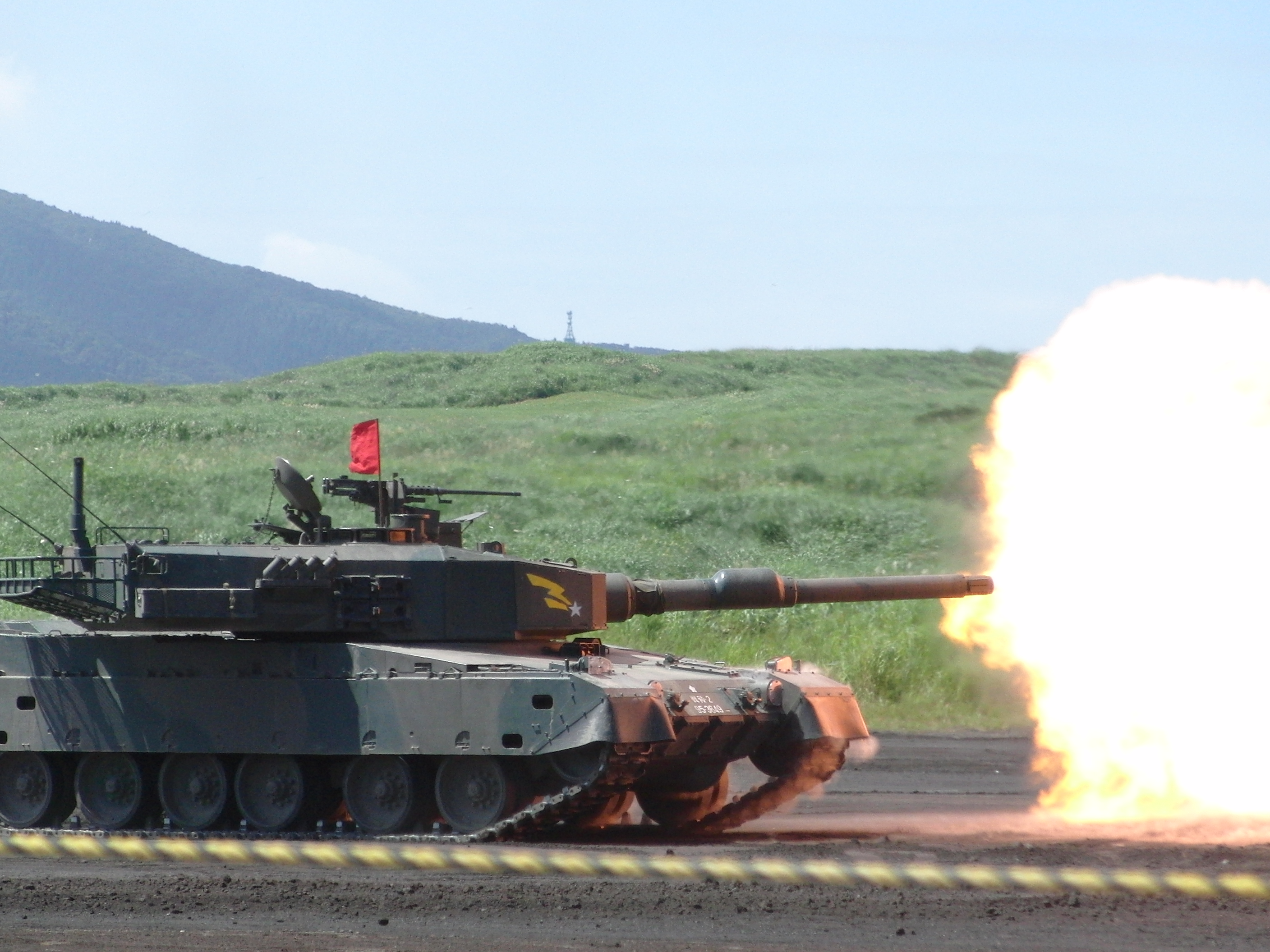
- A JGSDF Type 90 MBT practice firing at Fuji Firepower Review 2009
- Type: Main battle tank
- Place of origin: Japan

Production history
- Designer: Mitsubishi Heavy Industries/Japan Ministry of Defense Technology Research and Development Institute
- Manufacturer: Mitsubishi Heavy Industries
- Unit cost: JPY¥800 Million (2009)
- Produced: 1990–2009
- No. built: 341

Specifications
- Mass: 50.2 tonnes
- Length: 9.76 m
- Width: 3.43 m
- Height: 2.34 m
- Crew: 3
- Armor: Modular ceramic composite armour
- Main armament: Rheinmetall 120mm L/44 smoothbore gun with automatic loader
- Secondary armament: M2HB 12.7 mm machine gun Type 74 7.62 mm machine gun
- Engine: Mitsubishi 10ZG32WT 10-cylinder, two-stroke cycle, 1,500 hp/2,400 rpm diesel 21.5 litre
- Power/weight: 30 hp/tonne
- Transmission: Mitsubishi MT1500 automatic transmission (4 forward gears, 2 reverse gears )
- Suspension: hydropneumatic
- Operational range: 350 km
- Maximum speed: 70 km/h

The Type 90 tank (90式戦車, Kyū-maru-shiki-sensha) is a main battle tank (MBT) of the Japan Ground Self-Defense Force (JGSDF). It was designed and built by Mitsubishi Heavy Industries as a replacement for the Type 61 and to supplement the then current fleet of Type 74 tanks, and entered service in 1990.

== History ==
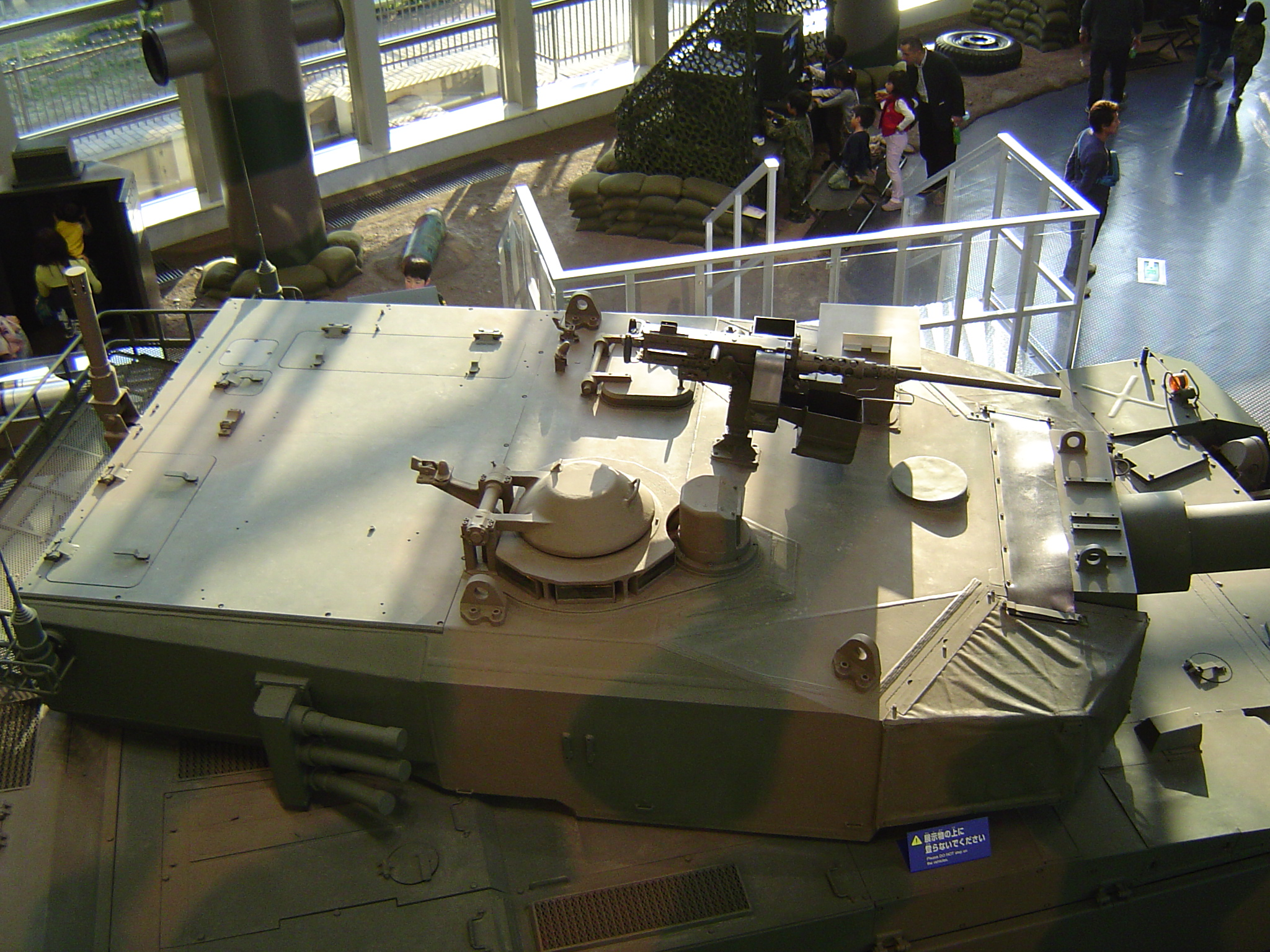
The turret of the Type 90 at the JGSDF public information center. Note the large bustle area for the autoloader, as well as the configuration of the grenade launchers.

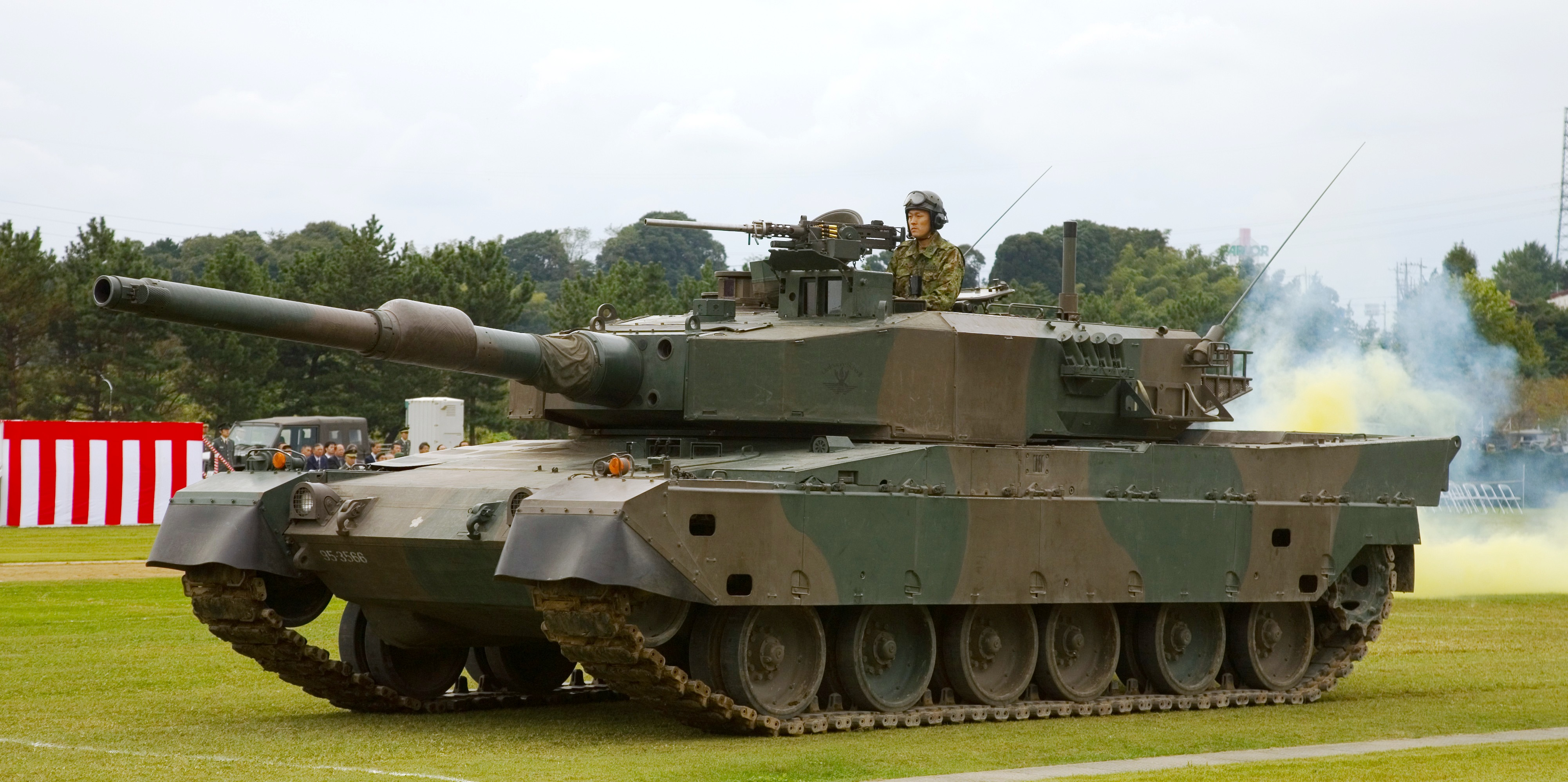
A Type 90 during a public demonstration at the JGSDF Ordnance School in Tsuchiura, Kanto, Japan.

After the adoption of the Type 74, the Japanese High Command was already looking for a superior, completely indigenous tank designed to defeat the Soviet T-72. As a result, development of a prototype Joint development was performed by Mitsubishi Heavy Industries and TRDI (Japan Defense Agency's Technology Research and Development Institute). Major subcontractors included Japan Steel Works, Daikin Industries, Mitsubishi Electric, Fujitsu and NEC.

A first series of two prototypes of the Type 90 were developed, both armed with a Japanese 120 mm smoothbore gun (produced by Japan Steel Works Limited) firing Japanese ammunition (produced by Daikin Industries Limited).

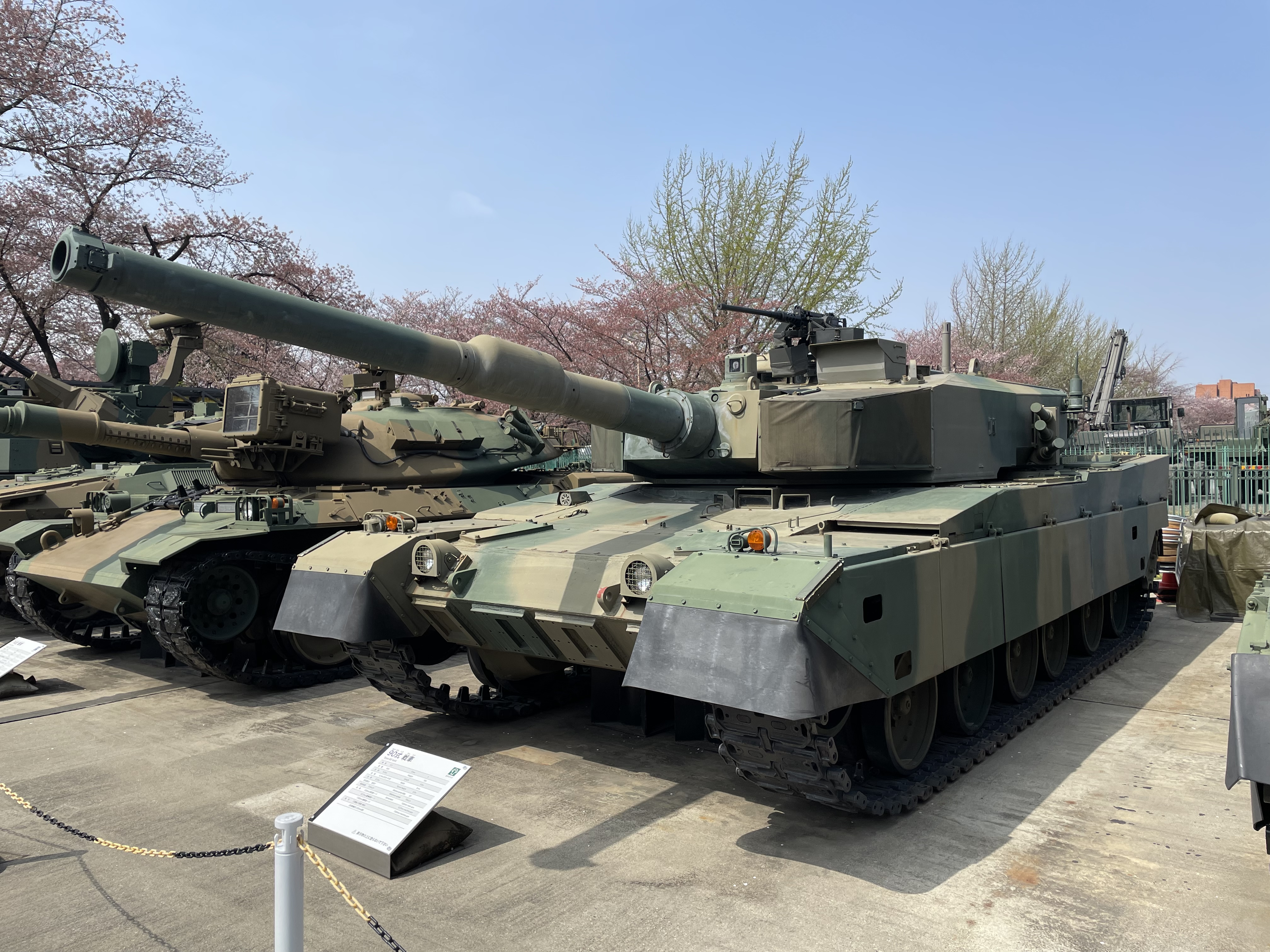
The second prototype of the Type 90 on display at the JGSDF Public Information Center. It was the last prototype to feature the Japan Steel Works 120mm main gun, with future prototypes (later official production) using the Rheinmetall 120mm main gun instead.

A second series of four prototypes was built between 1986 and 1988, incorporating changes resulting from trials with the first two prototypes. These were armed with the Rheinmetall 120 mm smoothbore gun also fitted to the German Leopard 2 and, in a modified version, the US M1A1/M1A2 Abrams main battle tanks. These second prototypes were used for development and then user trials, all of which were completed by December 1989, before Japan formally introduced the Type 90 in August 1990. Mass production began in 1990, and 30 vehicles were produced by the end of the year.

With the exception of the 120 mm smoothbore gun, which is made under license from Rheinmetall of Germany, the Type 90 and its subsystems are all designed and built in Japan, leading to higher per unit costs than comparable models from NATO countries such as the M1 Abrams and the Challenger 2. Development of upgrades to the Type 90 suffered both as a result of limited budget, which caused procurement delays, and funding prioritization in favor of the Type 10 main battle tank. Due to a perception that Type 90s are unsuited to operations in the tight confines of Japan's urban areas, they are preferentially assigned to the JGSDF Fuji School Brigade and the 7th Armored Division based in Hokkaido, where there is sufficient room for maneuver.

With the exception of training exercises such as the annual Combined Live Fire Exercise hosted by the United States Army at Yakima Training Center in Washington state, the Type 90 has never been deployed overseas, and has never been tested in combat.

== Design ==
=== Armament ===
The Type 90 mounts a Rheinmetall L44 120 mm smoothbore cannon licensed produced by Japan Steel Works Limited. This is the same gun that is mounted on the German Leopard 2, the American Abrams, and the South Korean K1A1 tank. Before Rheinmetall's gun was selected, Japan had successfully produced a domestic version of the 120 mm smoothbore for testing, but the lower cost of the Rheinmetall gave it an advantage over the domestic version..

Since its introduction there have been several upgrades to the fire-control system, including the addition of a Yttrium-Aluminium-Garnet laser rangefinder with a range of 300 to 5,000 meters, a 32-bit ballistics analysis computer, improved thermal imaging and Automated-tracking systems, and improved gun stabilization. The FCS also has an automated tracking system, and is capable of engaging moving or stationary targets while moving in day or night. The automatic target tracking system uses a thermal image display which can be controlled by either the tank gunner or commander. It is capable of tracking soldiers, vehicles and helicopters. The targeting computer can also calculate lead on moving targets.

The commander's sight consists of a 3× / 10× (day-only sight). The sight can track vertically from −29 to +29 degrees, as well as track horizontally through 180 degrees. The gunners sight has a 10 x magnification.

The gun is armed and loaded by a mechanical bustle autoloader (conveyor-belt type) developed by Mitsubishi of Japan. As with autoloader-equipped Russian main battle tanks, the French Leclerc, and the Swedish Strv 103, the Type 90 achieves manpower savings by reducing the crew to three. Its ability to operate without a loader also allows the use of a smaller turret. The practical auto-loading and firing cycle for one target is around 4–6 seconds.

Mounted in front of the gunner's hatch on the turret is the ubiquitous Browning M2 machine gun, manufactured under license by Sumitomo Heavy Industries, part of the Sumitomo Group. In addition to the .50-caliber machine gun, a Japanese-built 7.62 mm machine gun is mounted coaxially to the left of the main gun.

=== Armor ===
The profile of the Type 90 is similar to the German Leopard 2A4 and it uses modular ceramic and steel composite armor, common in contemporary tank designs. The adoption of modular composite armor design facilitates the upgrading and exchange of the armor.

The Type 90 is smaller than most main battle tanks with a height of 2.33 metres (7.6 ft), a width of 3.33 metres (10.9 ft), and a weight of 50.2 metric tons (55.3 short tons). It was designed with a distinctive low-slung turret with boxy, vertical sides and a long overhanging bustle. In comparison, the Leopard 2A4's dimensions are 2.48 metres (8.1 ft) high and 3.70 metres (12.1 ft) wide with a weight of 55.2 metric tons (60.8 short tons).

=== Mobility ===
The powerpack of the Type 90 tank has the Mitsubishi 10ZG32WT 10-cylinder two-stroke cycle diesel engine providing 1500 hp, coupled with Mitsubishi MT1500 automatic transmission with four forward and two reverse gears, manufactured by Mitsubishi Heavy Industries (designated 10ZG32WT, MT1500). The development of the 10ZG32WT prototype was started in 1972 and was finished in 1982. It can attain a top output of 1,120 kW (1,500 horsepower @15min).

The hydropneumatic suspension units are mounted on the front and rear pair of road wheels, which can be adjusted on-the-fly to deal with uneven terrain, a requirement on Japan's rough, mountainous terrain.

According to the Japanese Ministry of Defense official data report, the acceleration of the type is 0–200 m in 20 seconds.

=== Manufacture ===
The Type 90 has an approximate unit cost of 790 million Japanese yen or approximately 7.4 million US dollars at 2007 exchange rates.

341 Type 90 tanks were produced between 1990 and 2009 with an average annual production number of 19 vehicles. The original procurement plan was established in the 1980s while Japan was experiencing asset price bubble. After the asset price bubble burst in 1991 and the collapse of Soviet Union in 1992, Japan started to cut its defense budget. In order to save budget for Kongo-class destroyers and other new weapons, Japan made a plan to reduce the size of its tank force. The production of Type 90 therefore slowed down and part of its budget was shifted to the research and development of the new Type 10 main battle tank.

=== Transportation ===
Being 12 tonnes heavier than its predecessor, the Type 74, the Type 90 was found to be more challenging to operate around Japan, with the exception of Hokkaido. Some politicians therefore criticized the effectiveness of Type 90 due to difficulty in transportation. In fact, more than 65% of major bridges in Japan were still considered passable for the Type 90, while overseas main battle tanks, such as Challenger 2 and Leopard 2, could only use 40% of bridges in Japan.

== Operators ==
Japan: 341 (2014)

- Japan Ground Self-Defense Force
  - Northern Army
    - 2nd Division
      - 2nd Tank Regiment
    - 5th Brigade
      - 5th Tank Battalion
    - 7th Division
      - 72nd Tank Regiment
      - 73rd Tank Regiment
      - 7th Reconnaissance Company
    - 11th Brigade
      - 11th Tank Battalion
  - JGSDF Fuji School
    - Armor Department
    - JGSDF Fuji School (Combined Training) Brigade
      - Armored Guidance Corps
    - Training Evaluation Unit
  - JGSDF Ordnance School (JGSDF Camp Tsuchiura)
