= 1st Artillery Brigade =

1st Artillery Brigade may refer to:

- 1st Artillery Brigade (Japan)
- 1st Artillery Brigade (South Korea)
- 1st Artillery Brigade (United Kingdom)

== See also ==
- 1st Brigade (disambiguation)
