= Type 99 155 mm self-propelled howitzer =

Japanese artillery

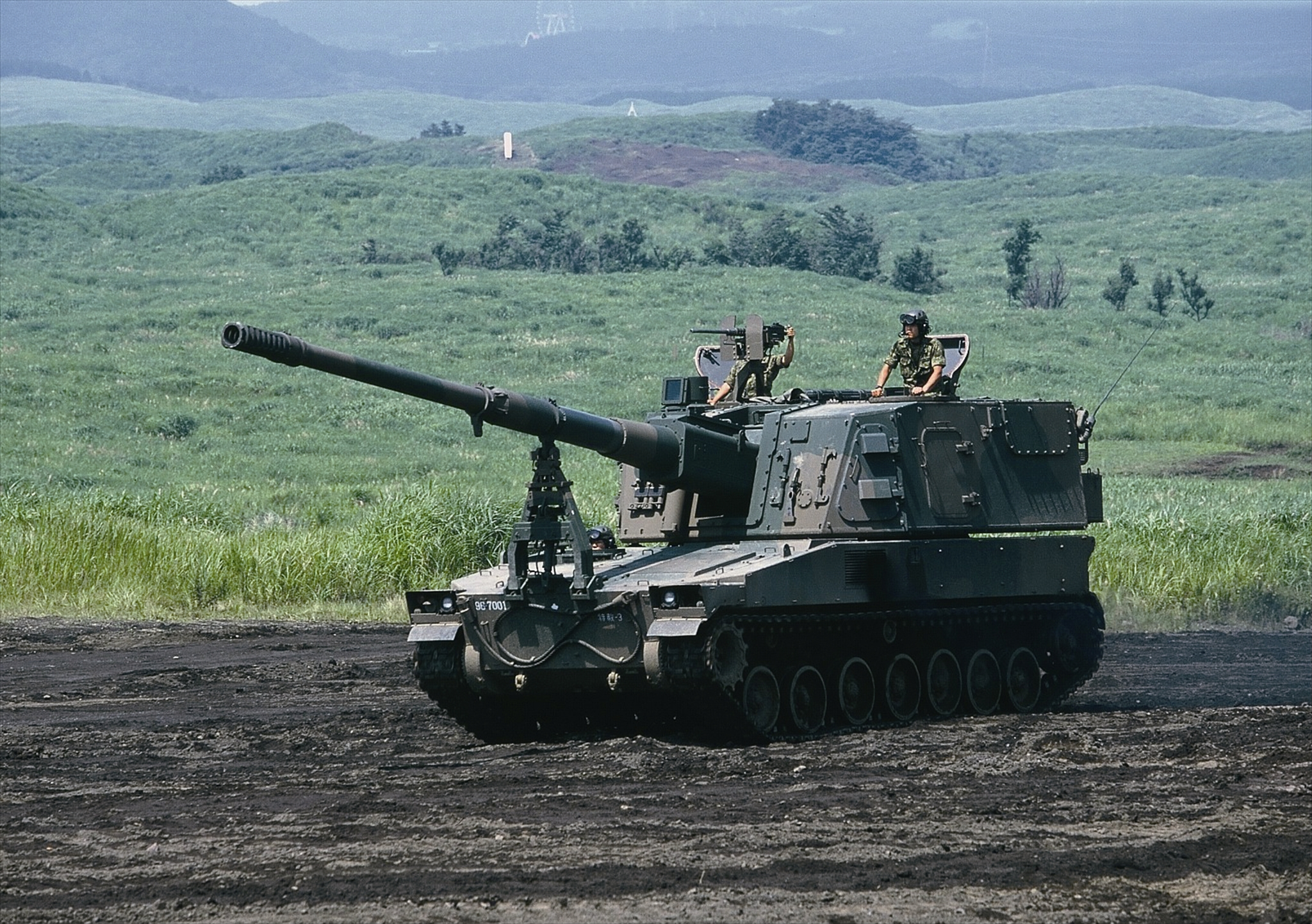
- A Type 99 of the Japan Ground Self-Defense Force
- Type: Self-propelled howitzer
- Place of origin: Japan

Service history
- In service: 1999–…
- Used by: see Operators

Production history
- Designer: Technical Research and Development Institute
- Designed: 1994–1999
- Manufacturer: Mitsubishi Heavy Industries (hull), Japan Steel Works (gun, turret)
- Unit cost: 960 million yen
- Produced: 1999–2022
- No. built: 136

Specifications
- Mass: 40 t (39 long tons; 44 short tons)
- Length: 11.3 m (37 ft) (gun front)
- Width: 3.2 m (10 ft)
- Height: 4.3 m (14 ft)
- Crew: 4
- Caliber: 155 mm (6.1 in)
- Traverse: 360°
- Rate of fire: 6 rpm
- Effective firing range: 30 km (19 mi) (standard); 40 km (25 mi) (base bleed)
- Armor: aluminium
- Main armament: 155 mm/L52 howitzer gun
- Secondary armament: 12.7 mm M2 Browning machine gun
- Engine: Mitsubishi 6SY31WA 4-stroke I6 liquid-cooled diesel 600 hp (450 kW)
- Power/weight: 15 hp/t
- Suspension: torsion bar
- Operational range: 300 km (190 mi)
- Maximum speed: 49.6 km/h (30.8 mph)

The Type 99 155 mm self-propelled howitzer (99式自走155mm榴弾砲, kyuu-kyuu-shiki-jisou-155mm-ryuudan-hou) is a 155 mm self-propelled howitzer of the Japan Ground Self-Defense Force, which was developed as the successor to the Type 75 155 mm self-propelled howitzer. Procurement of the Type 99 began in 1999 and the last vehicle was delivered in 2022. With a lower number built than the self-propelled howitzer it replaced, the Type 99 continues to serve alongside an increasing number of newer Type 19 155 mm wheeled self-propelled howitzers.

== Development ==
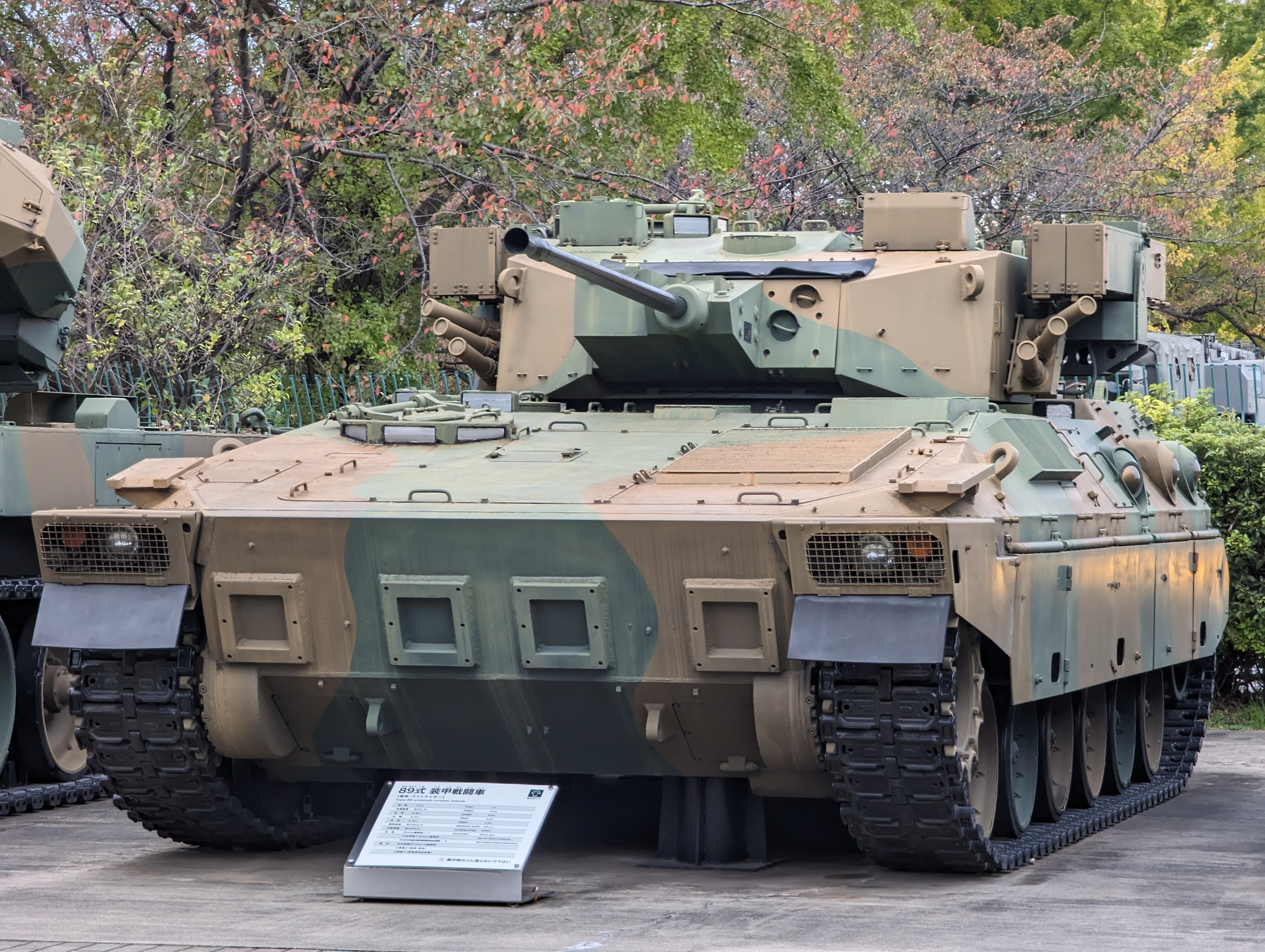
The Type 99 uses a lengthened Type 89 infantry fighting vehicle chassis.

Limitations of the Type 75 155 mm self-propelled howitzer's firing range became apparent relatively early, especially compared to the 155 mm towed howitzer FH70 that began entering service in 1983. Initial research and development for a successor to the Type 75 started in 1985. To increase the effective firing range, the new self-propelled howitzer would have a 52-caliber (L52) gun barrel instead of the 30-caliber (L30) barrel of the Type 75, and would mount the latest fire-control system.

Early proposals included modernising the Type 75 by replacing its 30-caliber gun barrel with the 39-caliber barrel from the FH70 to cut costs. Since it would have also required updating the fire control system, a new self-propelled gun on the Type 89 infantry fighting vehicle's chassis was pursued instead. Research and development on the turret, loading mechanism, barrel, and ammunition took place in 1987–1993.

Full-scale development of the Type 99 started in 1994. Japan Steel Works was the primary contractor, developing and manufacturing the main gun and turret. Mitsubishi Heavy Industries was tasked to design the chassis based on the Type 89's. Four prototype self-propelled howitzers and two ammunition resupply vehicles were built, which underwent technical testing until 1996 and began operational testing in 1997.

The Type 99 155 mm self-propelled howitzer received its official designation in 1999. Funding for the first four production vehicles was approved in the same year. The Type 99 was unveiled to the public in 2000.

== Characteristics ==
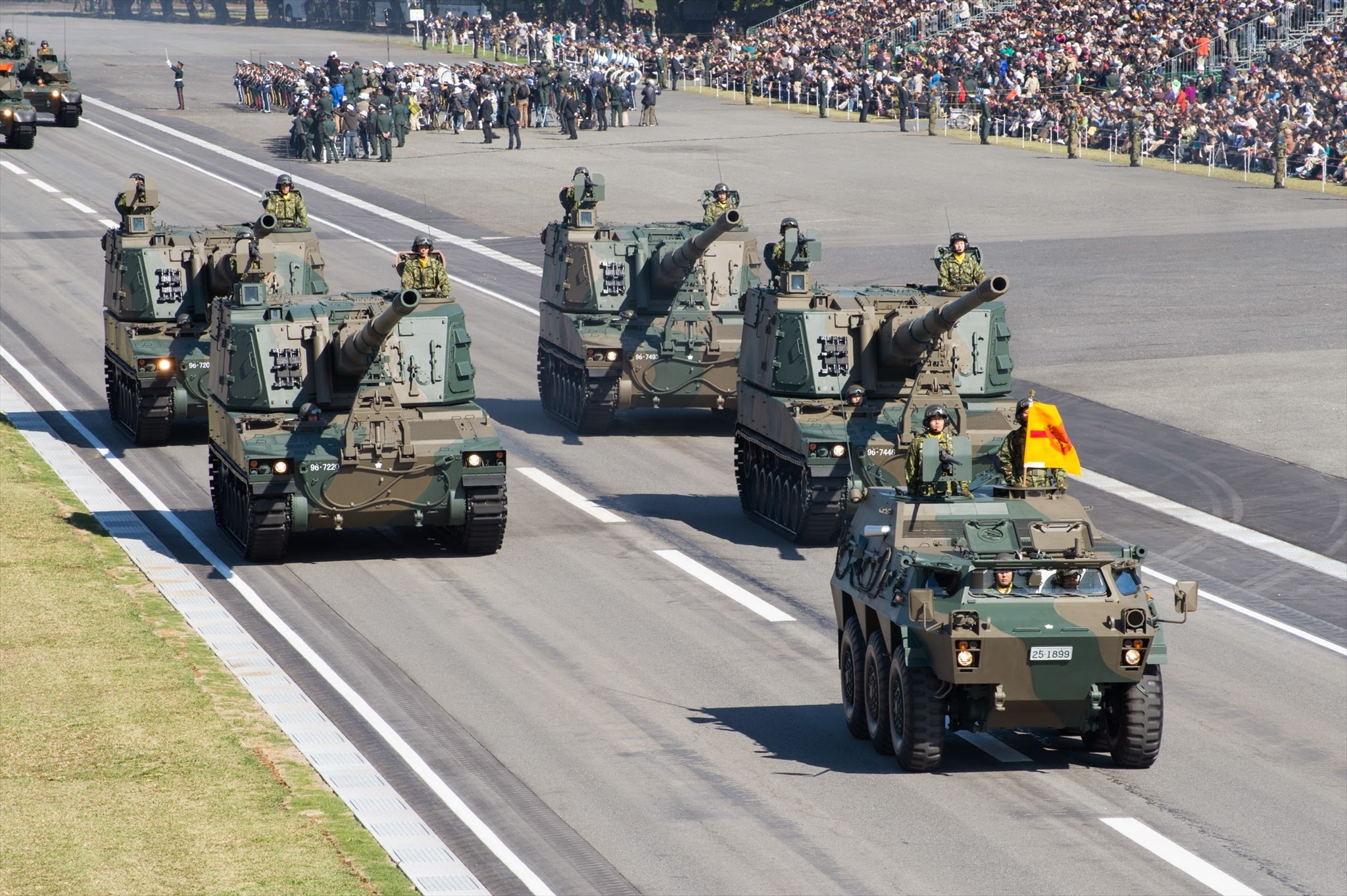
A Type 99 platoon led by a Type 82 Command and Communication Vehicle in a military parade.

The Type 99 155 mm self-propelled howitzer uses a modified chassis from the Type 89 infantry fighting vehicle, lengthened with an additional road wheel. The driver is seated on the front right side of the hull, with the engine on the front left. The rest of the crew is located in the fighting compartment in the rear. The turret is mounted on top of the rear hull, which can be accessed from a double-door at the rear of the vehicle.

Unlike the original Type 89, the Type 99's hull is equipped with aluminium armour instead of steel. Its aluminium armour provides protection against small arms fire and artillery fragments. Using torsion bar suspension on cost grounds sets the Type 99 apart from contemporary designs such as the AS-90 and K9 Thunder that feature more expensive hydropneumatic suspension for increased stability.

The Type 99 uses the same Mitsubishi 6SY31WA four-stroke inline-six liquid-cooled diesel engine that is installed in the Type 89. Due to having the same maximum output of 600 hp at 2,200 rpm while being heavier than the Type 89, the Type 99 with its 15 hp/t ratio is somewhat underpowered compared to similar vehicles. This results in decreased mobility and top speed.

A notable feature of the Type 99 is its automatic loading mechanism for both shells and propellant charges. The preceding Type 75 only loaded automatically the shells, the propellant charges were loaded manually by the crew. The automatic loading system is in the rear of the turret, which can be coupled to the Type 99 ammunition resupply vehicle.

The Type 99's 155 mm howitzer gun has a 52-caliber barrel. A significantly longer gun barrel compared to the preceding Type 75 results in increased effective firing range – up to 40 km using base-bleed shells. The Type 99's muzzle brake is similar in configuration to that of the Panzerhaubitze 2000. To avoid damaging the gun, a travel lock is mounted on the front of the hull, which folds back onto the glacis plate when not in use. The secondary armament consists of a turret roof-mounted 12.7 mm M2 Browning machine gun, fitted with a gun shield.

== Operational history ==
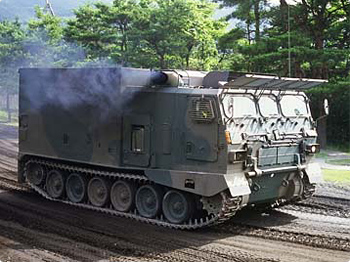
Type 99 self-propelled howitzers are accompanied by Type 99 ammunition resupply vehicles.

Procurement of the Type 99 155 self-propelled howitzer started in 1999, when funding for the first four vehicles was approved. Due to its comparatively high price, annual procurement quantities remained between six and nine howitzers. Low production number and shifting priorities meant that the Type 99 did not replace the Type 75 155 mm self-propelled howitzer on a one-to-one basis. The final Type 99 was produced and delivered to the Japan Ground Self-Defense Force in 2022.

A notable non-combat loss of Type 99s occurred on 1 April 2001. Shortly after departing Japan en route to the United States for testing in the Yuma Proving Ground, the cargo ship carrying two Type 99s and their associated equipment sank. Estimates of equipment losses totalled 56 million dollars and testing was postponed, although it was completed a year later when the lost howitzers and other equipment had been replaced. Constraints of domestic proving rounds meant that long-range base-bleed shells could only be thoroughly tested abroad.

The Type 99 continues to serve exclusively in the Japan Ground Self-Defense Force into the 2020s and beyond. The more affordable Type 19 155 mm wheeled self-propelled howitzer complements the Type 99 in service and is now the only self-propelled howitzer produced in Japan.

== Operators ==
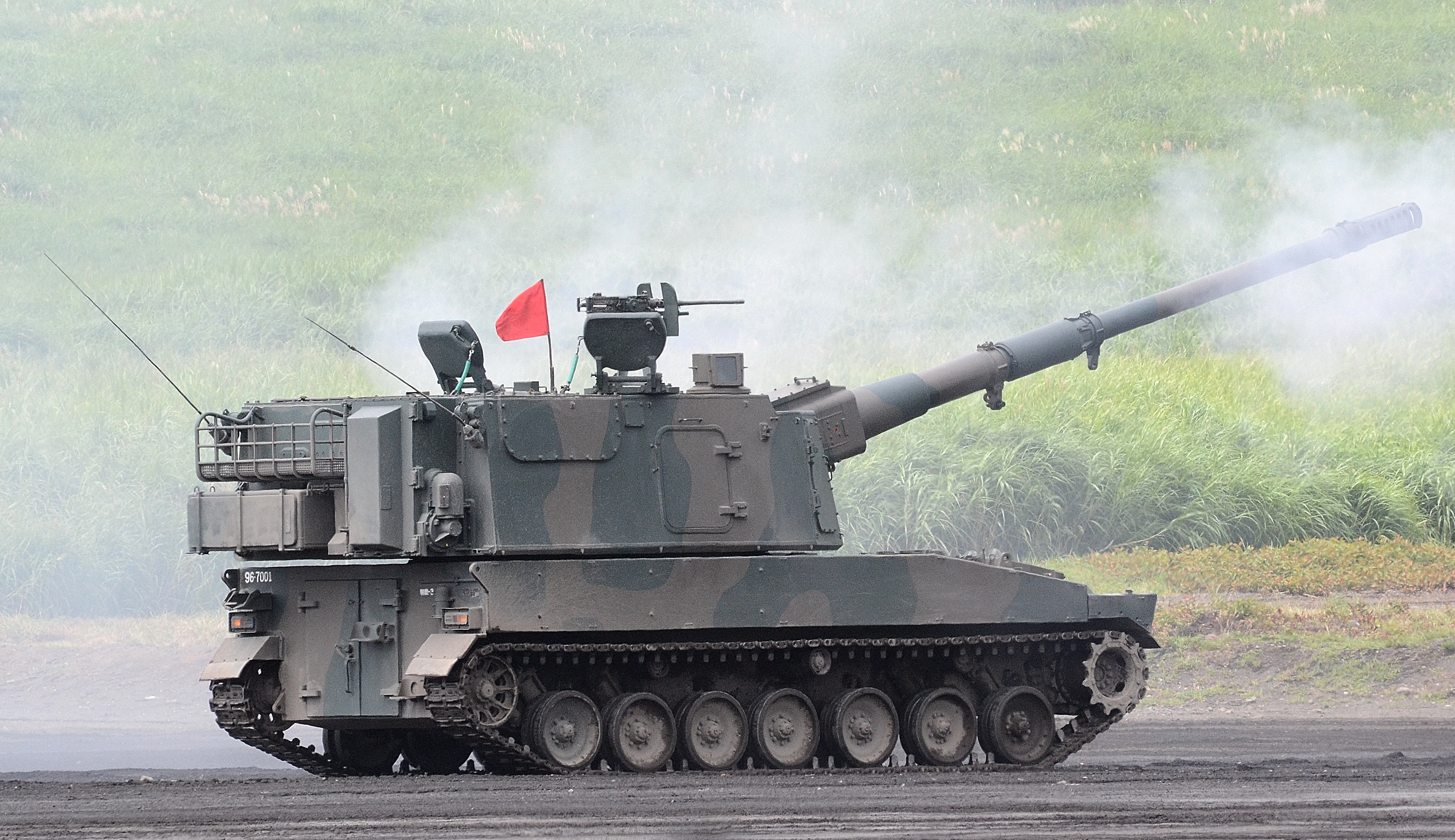
A Type 99 firing during an exercise in the East Fuji Maneuver Area.

Japan

- Japan Ground Self-Defense Force
  - Fuji School
    - Fuji School(Combined Training)Brigade
      - JGSDF Artillery School Unit
    - Ordnance School
  - Northern Army
    - 2nd Division
      - 2nd Artillery Regiment(Mechanized)
    - 5th Brigade
      - 5th Artillery Unit
    - 7th Division
      - 7th Artillery Regiment(Mechanized)
    - 11th Brigade
      - 11th Artillery Unit (Mechanized)
  - Northern Army Combined Brigade
    - 1st Sergeant Training Unit

== Similar vehicles ==
- AS-90 – (United Kingdom)
- AHS Krab – (Poland)
- 2S19 Msta-S – (Soviet Union, Russia)
- Panzerhaubitze 2000 – (Germany)
- K9 Thunder – (South Korea)
- PLZ-05 – (China)
