= 5th Brigade (Japan) =

Japan Ground Self-Defense Force infantry brigade

- 5th Brigade Distinctive Unit Insignia
- Active: 29 March 2004 – present
- Country: Japan
- Branch: Japan Ground Self-Defense Force
- Type: Brigade
- Size: 3600
- Part of: Northern Army
- Garrison/HQ: Obihiro

Commanders
- Current commander: Maj. Gen. Hidehisa Tokuda

The 5th Brigade (Japanese: 第5旅団) is one of eight active brigades of the Japan Ground Self-Defense Force. The brigade is subordinated to the Northern Army and is headquartered in Obihiro, Hokkaidō. Its responsibility is the defense of North Eastern Hokkaidō.

The brigade was formed on 29 March 2004 with units from the disbanded 5th Infantry Division.

== Organization ==
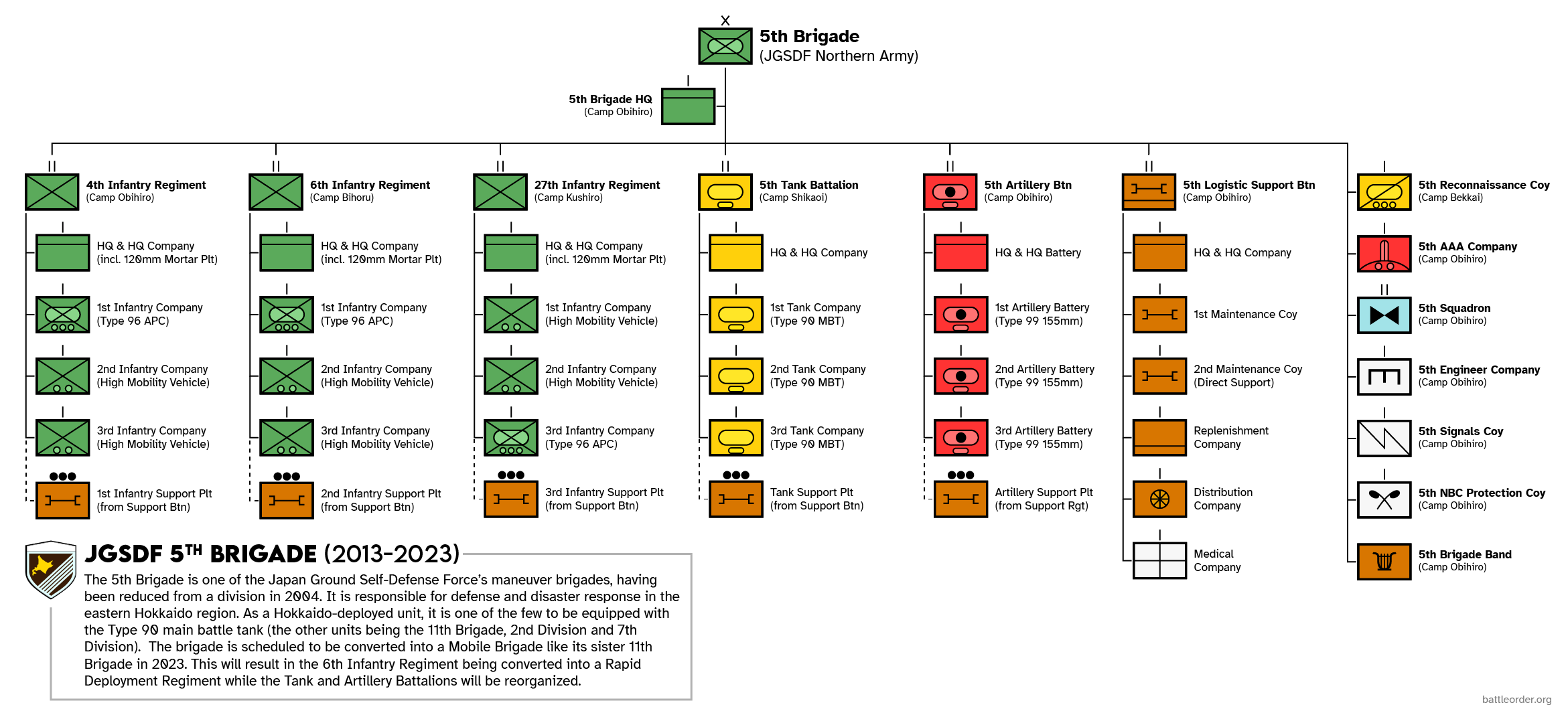
JGSDF 5th Brigade organization in 2022

- 5th Brigade, in Obihiro
  - 5th Brigade HQ, in Obihiro
  - 5th Tank Battalion, in Shikaoi, with three Squadrons of Type 90 Main Battle Tanks
  - 4th Infantry Regiment ^{note 1}, in Obihiro
  - 6th Rapid Deployment Regiment, in Bihoro
  - 27th Infantry Regiment, in Kushiro
  - 5th Artillery Battalion, in Obihiro, with three batteries of Type 99 155mm Self-propelled howitzers
  - 5th Reconnaissance Company, in Betsukai, with Type 87 Armored Reconnaissance Vehicle
  - 5th Intelligence Company, in Obihiro, with ScanEagle
  - 5th Anti-Aircraft Artillery Company, in Obihiro, with Type 81 and Type 93 Surface-to-air missile systems
  - 5th Combat Engineer Company, in Obihiro
  - 5th Signal Company, in Obihiro
  - 5th Aviation Squadron, in Obihiro, flying UH-1J and OH-6D helicopters
  - 5th NBC Defense Company, in Obihiro
  - 5th Logistic Support Battalion, in Obihiro

note 1: Infantry Regiments have only battalion strength.

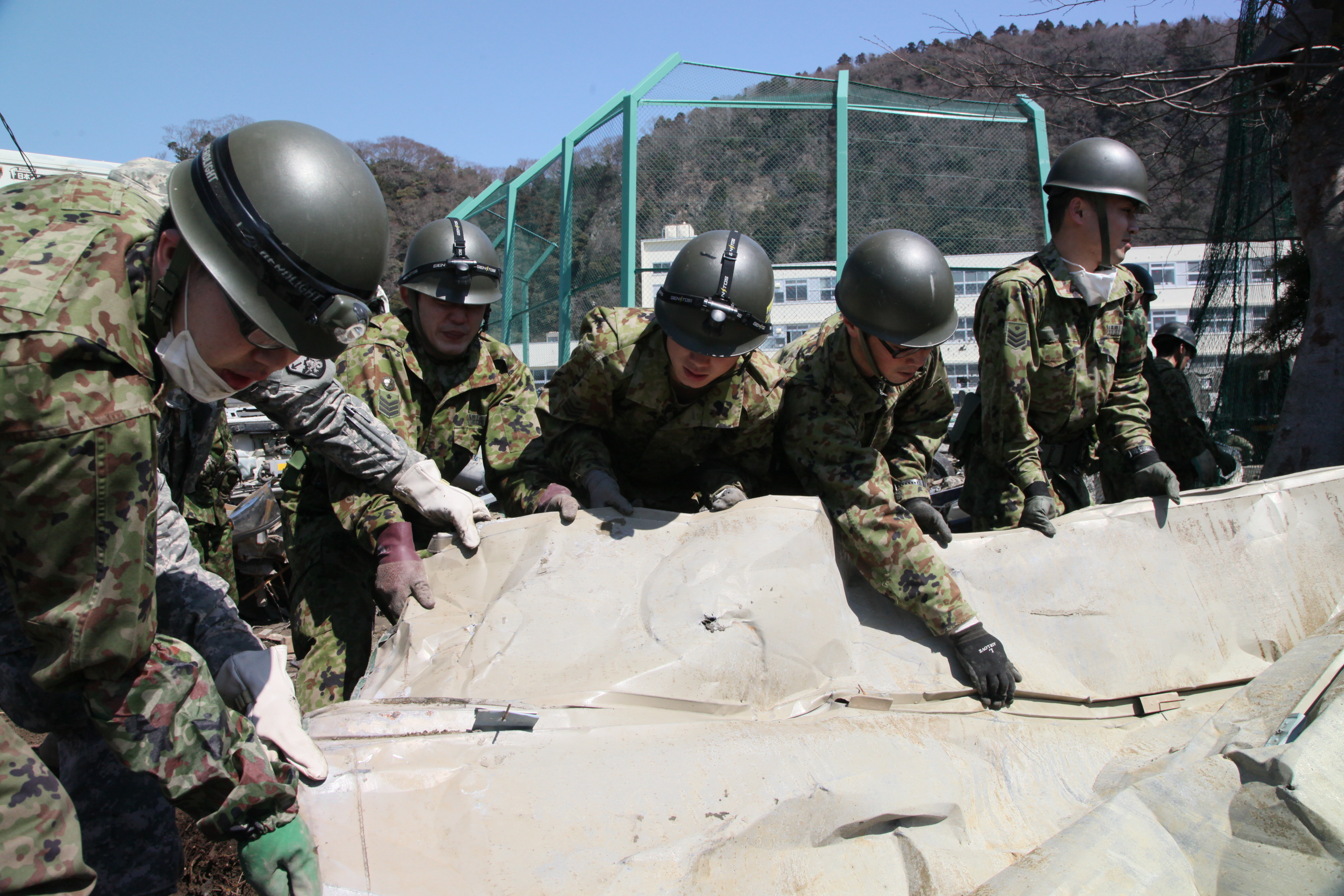
Members of the 5th Brigade of the Ground Self Defense Force who clear rubble at Ishinomaki Shin Minato Elementary School who was affected by the 2011 Tōhoku earthquake and tsunami
