= 2nd Division (Japan) =

- 2nd Division Distinctive Unit Insignia
- Active: 18 January 1962 – present
- Country: Japan
- Branch: Japan Ground Self-Defense Force
- Type: Infantry division
- Size: 8,100 soldiers
- Part of: Northern Army
- Garrison/HQ: Camp Asahikawa, Asahikawa, Hokkaidō
- Nicknames: Northern Protector (北鎮, Hokuchin)

Commanders
- Current commander: Lt. Gen. Kazutomo Idogawa

The 2nd Division (第2師団, Dai-Ni Shidan) is one of nine active divisions of the Japan Ground Self-Defense Force. The division is subordinated to the Northern Army and is headquartered at Camp Asahikawa in Asahikawa, Hokkaidō. Its responsibility is the defense of North Western Hokkaidō.

The division was raised on 18 January 1962.

== Organization ==
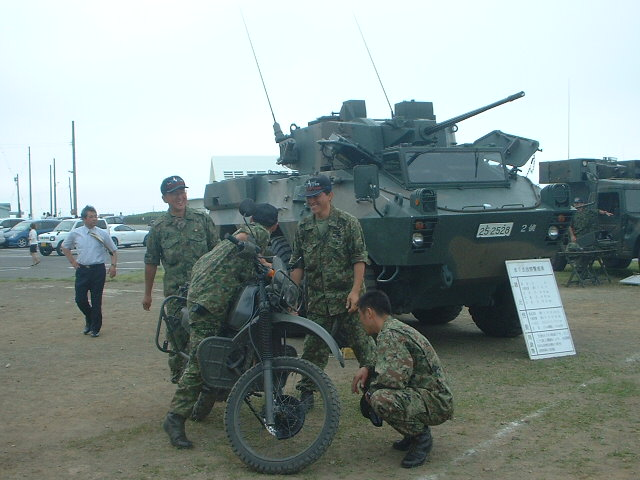
2nd Recon Unit and Type 87 ARV

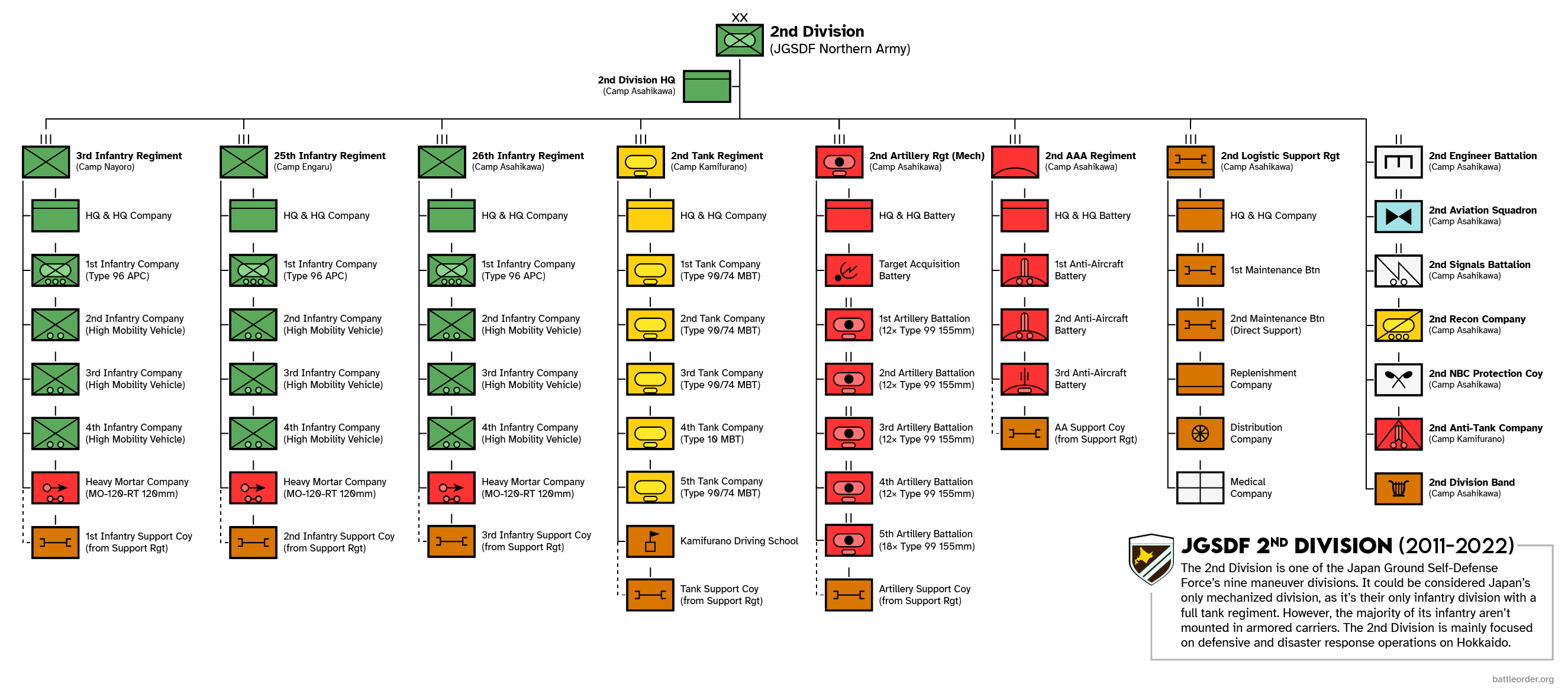
JGSDF 2nd Division organization

- 2nd Division, at Camp Asahikawa in Asahikawa
  - 2nd Division HQ, at Camp Asahikawa
  - 3rd Rapid Deployment Regiment, at Camp Nayoro in Nayoro, with Type 96 armored personnel carriers and Type 16 maneuver combat vehicle
  - 25th Infantry Regiment^{note 1}, at Camp Engaru in Engaru
  - 26th Infantry Regiment, at Camp Rumoi in Rumoi
  - 2nd Tank Regiment, at Camp Kamifurano in Kamifurano, with three squadrons employing Type 90 and one Type 10 main battle tank squadron
  - 2nd Artillery Regiment (Mechanized), at Camp Asahikawa
    - 1st Artillery Battalion, with two batteries of Type 99 155 mm self-propelled howitzers
    - 2nd Artillery Battalion, with two batteries of Type 99 155 mm self-propelled howitzers
    - 3rd Artillery Battalion, with two batteries of Type 99 155 mm self-propelled howitzers
    - 4th Artillery Battalion, with two batteries of Type 99 155 mm self-propelled howitzers
    - 5th Artillery Battalion, with three batteries of Type 99 155 mm self-propelled howitzers
  - 2nd Anti-Aircraft Artillery Battalion, at Camp Asahikawa, with three batteries employing a mix of Type 81 and Type 93 surface-to-air missile systems
  - 2nd Aviation Squadron, at Camp Asahikawa, flying UH-1J
  - 2nd Engineer Battalion (Combat), at Camp Asahikawa
  - 2nd Logistic Support Regiment, at Camp Asahikawa
    - 1st Maintenance Battalion
    - 2nd Maintenance Battalion
    - Supply Company
    - Medical Company
    - Transport Company
  - 2nd Signal Battalion, at Camp Asahikawa
  - 2nd Reconnaissance Company, at Camp Nayoro, with Type 87 armored reconnaissance vehicles
  - 2nd Intelligence Company, at Camp Kamifurano, with ScanEagle
  - 2nd Anti-Tank Company, at Camp Kamifurano in Kamifurano
  - 2nd NBC-defense Company, at Camp Asahikawa
  - 2nd Band, at Camp Asahikawa

note 1: Infantry regiments are roughly battalion strength, derived from the Pentomic structure that reorganized regiments from consisting of battalions to consisting of companies. Battalions in Japanese practice generally refer to smaller units composed of fewer companies or batteries, such as a 2-company divisional tank battalion as opposed to a 5-company tank regiment.
