= 11th Brigade (Japan) =

- 11th Brigade Distinctive Unit Insignia
- Active: 11 March 2008 – present
- Country: Japan
- Branch: Japan Ground Self-Defense Force
- Type: Brigade
- Size: about 3900 soldiers
- Part of: Northern Army
- Garrison/HQ: Sapporo

Commanders
- Current commander: Maj. Gen. Takashi Tomisaki

The 11th Brigade (Japanese: 第11旅団) is one of eight active brigades of the Japan Ground Self-Defense Force. The brigade is subordinated to the Northern Army and is headquartered in Sapporo, Hokkaidō. Its responsibility is the defense of South Western Hokkaidō.

The brigade was formed on 11 March 2008 with units from the disbanded 11th Infantry Division. It was originally a division, formed in 1960.

== Organization ==
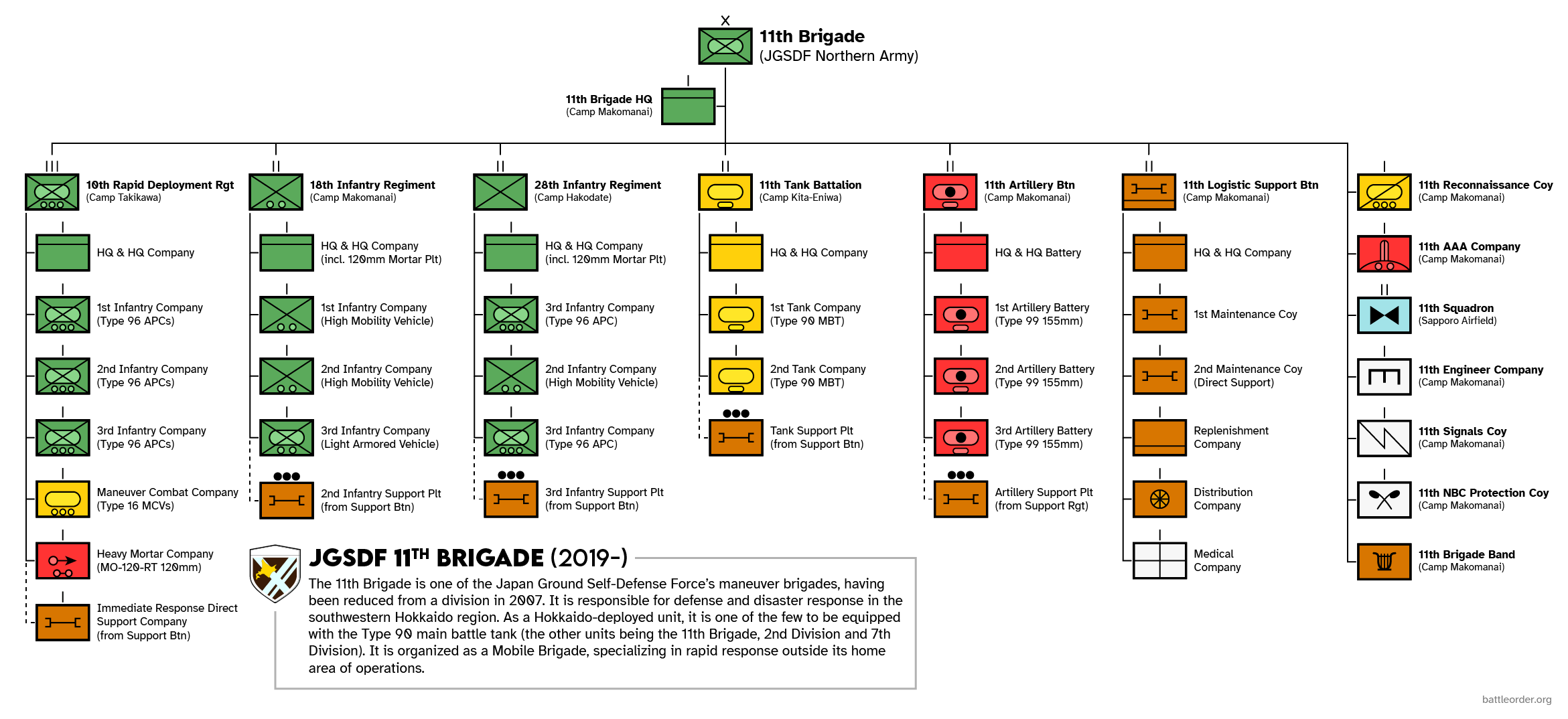
JGSDF 11th Brigade organization

- 11th Brigade, in Sapporo
  - 11th Brigade HQ, in Sapporo
  - 11th Tank Battalion, in Sapporo, with 2x Squadrons of Type 90 main battle tanks
  - 10th Rapid Deployment Regiment, in Takikawa, with 1x headquarters, 3x Type 96 armored personnel carrier, 1x 120 mm F1 mortar, and 1x Type 16 maneuver combat vehicle company
  - 18th Infantry Regiment, in Sapporo, with 1x headquarters, 3x Type 96 armored personnel carrier, and 1x 120 mm F1 mortar company
  - 28th Infantry Regiment, in Hakodate, with 1x headquarters, 3x Type 96 armored personnel carrier, and 1x 120mm F1 mortar company
  - 11th Artillery Battalion, in Sapporo, with 3x batteries of Type 99 155 mm self-propelled howitzers
  - 11th Reconnaissance Company, in Sapporo, with Type 87 armored reconnaissance vehicles
  - 11th Intelligence Company, in Sapporo, with ScanEagle
  - 11th Anti-Aircraft Artillery Company, in Sapporo, with Type 81 and Type 93 surface-to-air missile systems
  - 11th Combat Engineer Company, in Sapporo
  - 11th Signal Company, in Sapporo
  - 11th Aviation Squadron, in Sapporo, flying UH-1J and OH-6D helicopters
  - 11th NBC-defense Company, in Sapporo
  - 11th Logistic Support Battalion, in Sapporo
