= 1st Artillery Brigade (Japan) =

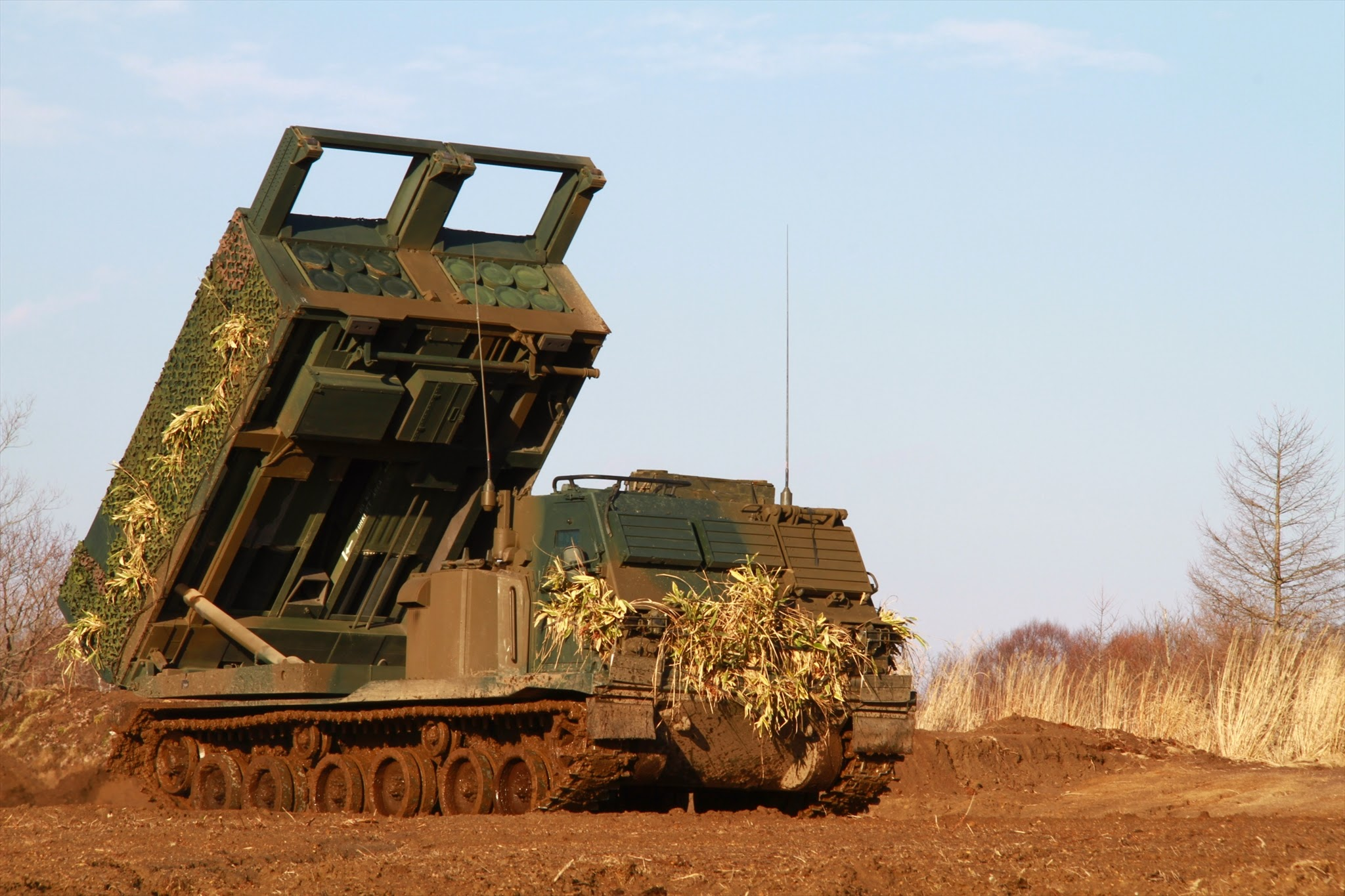
- An M270 MLRS of the 1st Artillery Group.
- Active: 15 October 1952 – present
- Country: Japan
- Branch: Japan Ground Self-Defense Force
- Type: Artillery
- Role: Anti-ship warfare Artillery observer Counter-battery fire Fire support Indirect fire
- Size: Brigade
- Part of: Northern Army
- Garrison/HQ: Camp Kita-Chitose, Chitose

Commanders
- Current commander: Maj. Gen. Wataru Inoue

The 1st Artillery Brigade (Japanese: 第1特科団) is an artillery brigade of the Japan Ground Self-Defense Force. The brigade is subordinated to the Northern Army and is headquartered in Chitose, Hokkaidō. Its responsibility is the defense of Hokkaidō.

As a part of the northern island's maritime defence, it provides fire support and indirect fire support to ground forces with multiple rocket launchers and coastal defence using anti-ship missiles. The brigade was formed on 15 October 1952 as the Northern Area Artillery Brigade under the National Safety Agency. The brigade was formed in 15 October 1952, when it was constituted as the Northern Area Artillery Brigade under the National Safety Agency, with its headquarters established at the Security Force Artillery School in Chiba Prefecture. Its formation was part of the wider reconstitution of Japan's military in the post-war period, after the transition from demilitarisation under the Allied occupation towards an organised system of national defence character. Its headquarters and subordinate artillery units moved to Hokkaidō during late 1952 and early 1953. In May 1953, an observation company was established to do fire observation and target acquisition. On 1 July 1954, following the establishment of the Rikuji under the newly constituted Defense Agency, the formation was redesignated the 1st Artillery Brigade. The headquarters and 301st Observation Company relocated to Camp Kita-Chitose in 1962.

In 1969, the brigade established the 125th Artillery Battalion, which received Japanese developed Type 30 rockets and fired its first shells at the Yausubetsu training area. In 1985, the brigade formed the 302nd Multiple Rocket Company, equipped with Type 75 130 mm self-propelled rocket launchers. The 1st Surface-to-Ship Missile Regiment was established in March 1992, after the dissolution of the 125th Artillery Battalion, and received Type 88 surface-to-ship missiles. The 2nd Surface-to-Ship Missile Regiment was formed at Bibai on 30 March 1993. The 3rd Surface-to-Ship Missile Regiment followed at Kamifurano on 28 March 1994.

== Organization ==
- 1st Artillery Brigade, in Chitose
  - 1st Artillery Brigade HQ, in Chitose
  - 1st Artillery Regiment (Mechanized), in Chitose
    - 129th Artillery Battalion, with three batteries of M270 multiple rocket launchers
    - 131st Artillery Battalion, in Kamifurano, with three batteries of M270 multiple rocket launchers
  - 1st Surface-to-Surface Missile Regiment, in Chitose, with three batteries of Type 88 surface-to-ship missiles
  - 2nd Surface-to-Surface Missile Regiment, in Bibai, with three batteries of Type 88 surface-to-ship missiles
  - 3rd Surface-to-Surface Missile Regiment, in Kamifurano, with three batteries of Type 88 surface-to-ship missiles
  - 301st Observation Battery, in Chitose
