= 7th Division (Japan) =

- 7th Division Distinctive Unit Insignia
- Active: 15 August 1962 – present
- Country: Japan
- Branch: Japan Ground Self-Defense Force
- Type: Armored division
- Size: ~ 6500 soldiers
- Part of: Northern Army
- Garrison/HQ: Camp Higashi Chitose, Chitose, Hokkaidō

Commanders
- Current commander: Lt. Gen. Makiya Ōta

The 7th Division (第7師団, Dai-Nana Shidan) is one of nine active divisions of the Japan Ground Self-Defense Force. The division is the only armored division of the Japan Ground Self-Defense Force. It is subordinated to the Northern Army and is headquartered in Chitose, Hokkaidō. Its responsibility is the defense of North Hokkaidō against potential conflicts, mostly from Russia.

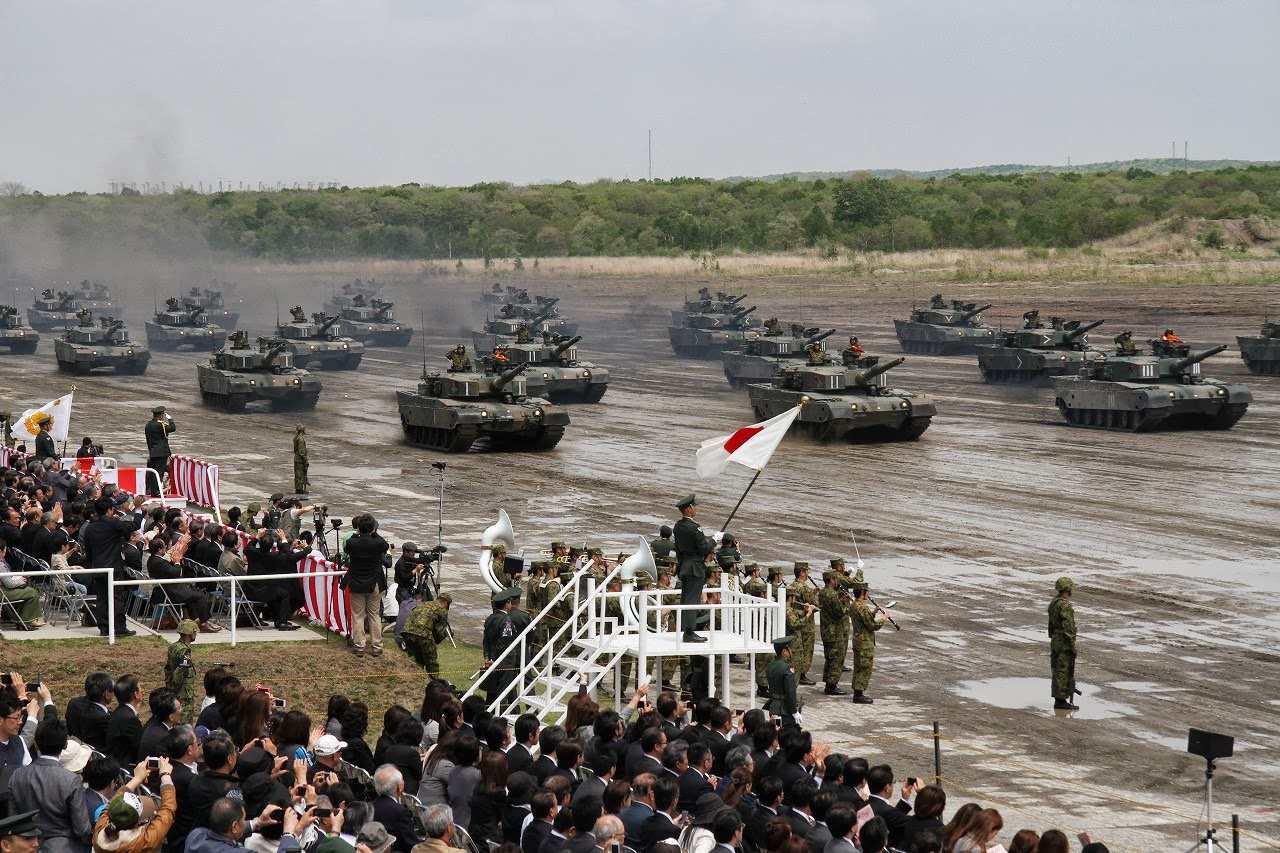
On June 2, 2013, the 58th anniversary of the 7th Division and the 59th anniversary of the establishment of Higashi Chitose Resident Ventures Parade.

The division was raised on 15 August 1962 as the 7th Mechanized Division. In 1981 it was merged with the 1st Armor Brigade to become the 7th Armored Division. As of 1987 it consisted of a headquarters, headquarters company, 7 regiments (3 armor, 1 motorized infantry, 1 artillery, 1 air defense artillery and 1 logistical support regiment), and 3 battalions (namely Reconnaissance, Combat Engineer, and Signals).

An armor regiment consisted of 5 tank squadrons with Type 10. A motorized infantry regiment had 6 motorized infantry companies and 1 mortar company. The artillery regiment contained 4 155-mm self-propelled howitzer battalions (10 guns in each).

In all, the armored division had about 6,500 men, 230 tanks, about 350 Type 89 and Type 73 armored personnel carriers, 40 self-propelled howitzers, 48 mortars (81-mm and larger), 40 35- and 40-mm self-propelled air defense systems, along with other armament and support systems, making it the most well-armed Japanese division.

== Organization ==
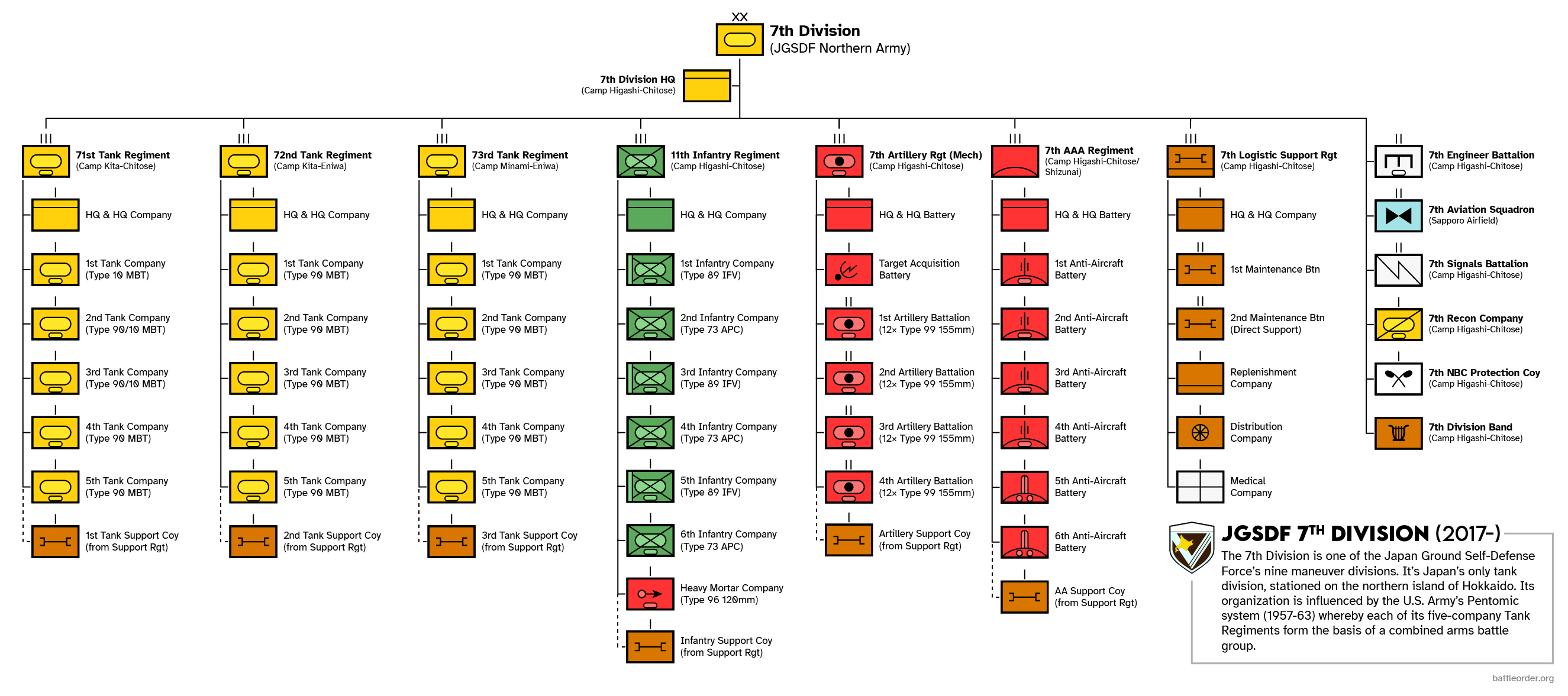
JGSDF 7th Division organization

7th Division consists of a division headquarters, three tank regiments, one mechanized infantry regiment, one mechanized artillery regiment, one air defense regiment, one logistics support regiment and other support and service battalions and companies. In the field, the division task organizes these elements into combined arms "combat teams". For example, attaching an infantry company, artillery battery, air defense battery and service units to a tank regiment to form a Tank Combat Team.

- 7th Division, at Camp Higashi Chitose in Chitose
  - 7th Division HQ, in Chitose
  - 71st Tank Regiment, in Chitose, with four Type 10 Main Battle Tank squadron
  - 72nd Tank Regiment, in Eniwa, with four Type 90 Main Battle Tank squadrons
  - 73rd Tank Regiment, in Eniwa, with five Type 90 Main Battle Tank squadrons
  - 11th Mechanized Infantry Regiment, in Chitose, with three Type 89 Infantry Fighting Vehicle, three Type 73 armored personnel carriers, and one Type 96 120mm self-propelled mortar carrier company
  - 7th Artillery Regiment (mechanized), in Chitose
    - 1st Artillery Battalion, with two batteries of Type 99 155mm self-propelled howitzers
    - 2nd Artillery Battalion, with two batteries of Type 99 155 mm self-propelled howitzers
    - 3rd Artillery Battalion, with two batteries of Type 99 155 mm self-propelled howitzers
    - 4th Artillery Battalion, with two batteries of Type 99 155 mm self-propelled howitzers
  - 7th Anti-Aircraft Artillery Regiment, in Shinhidaka, with two Type 81 Surface-to-air missile systems and four Type 87 self-propelled anti-aircraft gun batteries
  - 7th Engineer Battalion (Combat), in Chitose
  - 7th Signal Battalion, in Chitose
  - 7th Reconnaissance Company, in Chitose, with Type 87 armored reconnaissance vehicles
  - 7th Intelligence Company, in Chitose, with ScanEagle
  - 7th Aviation Squadron, at Chitose Airport, flying UH-1J helicopters
  - 7th NBC Protection Company, in Chitose
  - 7th Logistic Support Regiment, in Chitose
    - 1st Maintenance Battalion
    - 2nd Maintenance Battalion
    - Supply Company
    - Medical Company
    - Transport Company
  - 7th Division Band
