= Japan Steel Works =

Japanese steelmaker

The Japan Steel Works, Ltd.

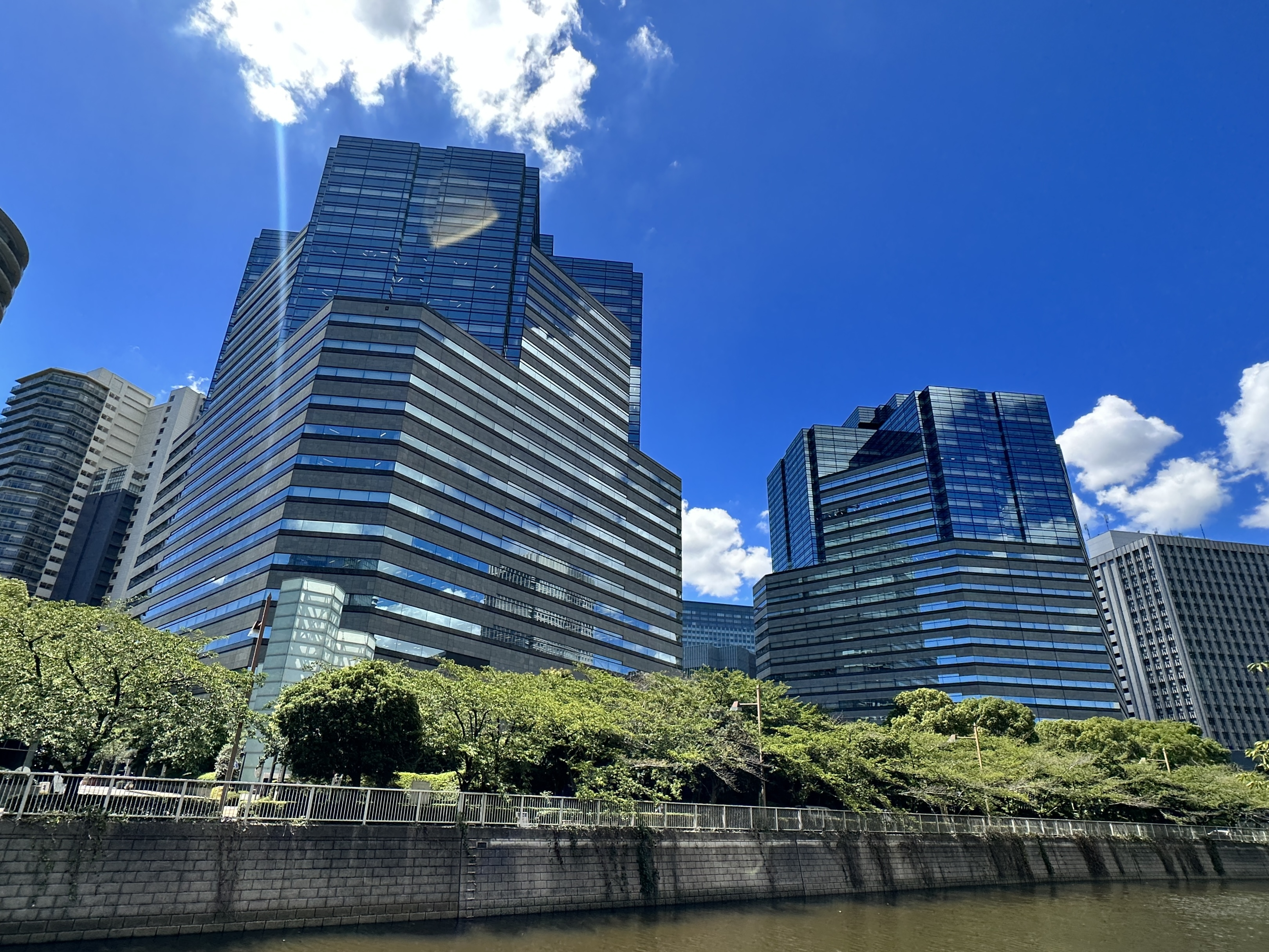
- Japan Steel Works's headquarters at Gate City Osaki in Ōsaki, Tokyo
- Company type: Public (K.K)
- Traded as: TYO: 5631; OSE: 5631; NAG: 5631; FSE: 5631; Nikkei 225 Component
- Industry: Industrial machinery
- Founded: November 1, 1907; 118 years ago
- Headquarters: Gate City Ohsaki-West Tower, 11-1, Osaki 1-chome, Shinagawa-ku, Tokyo 141-0032, Japan
- Key people: Ikuo Sato (CEO and President)
- Products: Iron and steel products; Chemical machinery; Nuclear power-related machinery; Pressure containers; Plastic injection machinery; Resin manufacturing and processing machinery; Hydraulic equipment
- Revenue: $ 2.346 billion USD (FY 2012) (¥ 220.65 billion JPY) (FY 2012)
- Net income: $ 88.04 million USD (FY 2012) (¥ 8.28 billion JPY) (FY 2012)
- Number of employees: 4,804 (consolidated) (as of March 2013)
- Subsidiaries: 31
- Website: Official website

The Japan Steel Works, Ltd. (株式会社日本製鋼所, Kabushiki Kaisha Nihon Seikōsho) is a steel manufacturer founded in Muroran, Hokkaidō, Japan in 1907.

== History ==
Japan Steel Works was set up with investment from British firms Vickers, Armstrong Whitworth and Mitsui. During World War II, they manufactured what was then the world's largest gun barrel to be fitted on the battleship Yamato. 200 workers in their main plant in Muroran were killed in a 15 July 1945 attack by Allied naval bombardments.

== Products ==
Japan Steel Works' industrial processes which are used to purify steel are held to high standards. These include the use of argon gas to eliminate impurities, and the addition of manganese, chromium and nickel to make the steel harder.

Japan Steel Works' services are in great demand owing to its role as one of only five manufacturers worldwide of the largest single-piece components of Reactor pressure vessels for nuclear reactors at the company's factory, which is located on the island of Hokkaidō. The other manufacturers as of 2010 are two companies in China, one in Russia (Atomenergomash) and one in France (Framatome). However, Japan Steel Works is the only one that can make cores in a single piece without welds, which reduces risk from radiation leakage. The company has boosted production to 6 units per year from 4 previously of the steel pressure vessel forgings, which contain the nuclear reactor core. It is scheduled to take capacity to 11 by 2013. Due to the production bottleneck, utilities across the world are submitting orders years in advance of any actual need, along with deposits worth hundreds of millions of dollars. Other manufacturers are examining various options, including finding ways to make a similar item using alternate methods, or making the component themselves with welds. However, welds are weak points which can result in reactor leakage.

Other items manufactured by Japan Steel Works include machines for processed plastics. They also continue to make a limited number of traditional Japanese swords. They are also involved in the development of the Type 10 battle tank, Type 99 155 mm self-propelled howitzer and Naval artillery.

== Financial information ==
In fiscal year 2001, Japan Steel Works posted a net loss of ¥1.81 billion on sales of ¥119.70 billion. Their performance improved in 2002, with net profit of ¥100 million on sales of ¥129 billion; however, this was far short of their earlier estimate of ¥600 million net profit on sales of ¥134 billion.

Japan Steel Works Ltd. increased net profit to ¥12.6 billion for the nine months to December 31, 2007. Revenue was up to ¥159.2 billion. Operating profit increased to ¥21.9 billion and ordinary profit rose to ¥21.2 billion. Full-year revenue forecast is unchanged at ¥ 218 billion to March 31, 2008. The company maintained a full-year net profit forecast of ¥15 billion.

== Gallery ==
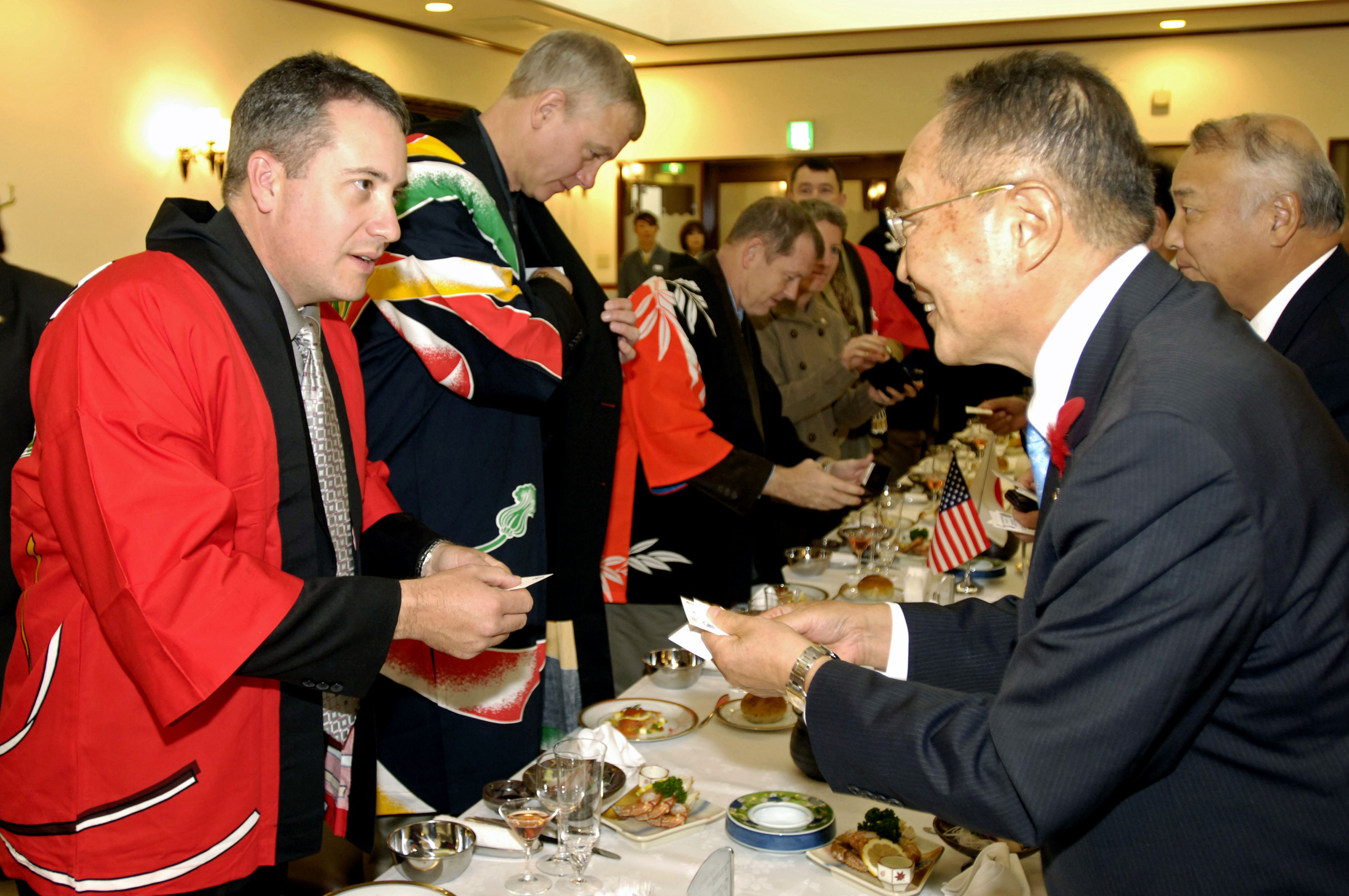
Cmdr. Dan Dusek, commanding officer of USS Fitzgerald (DDG 62), exchanges business cards with Muroran Mayor Masashi Shingu during a reception held in the Japanese Steel Works reception hall.

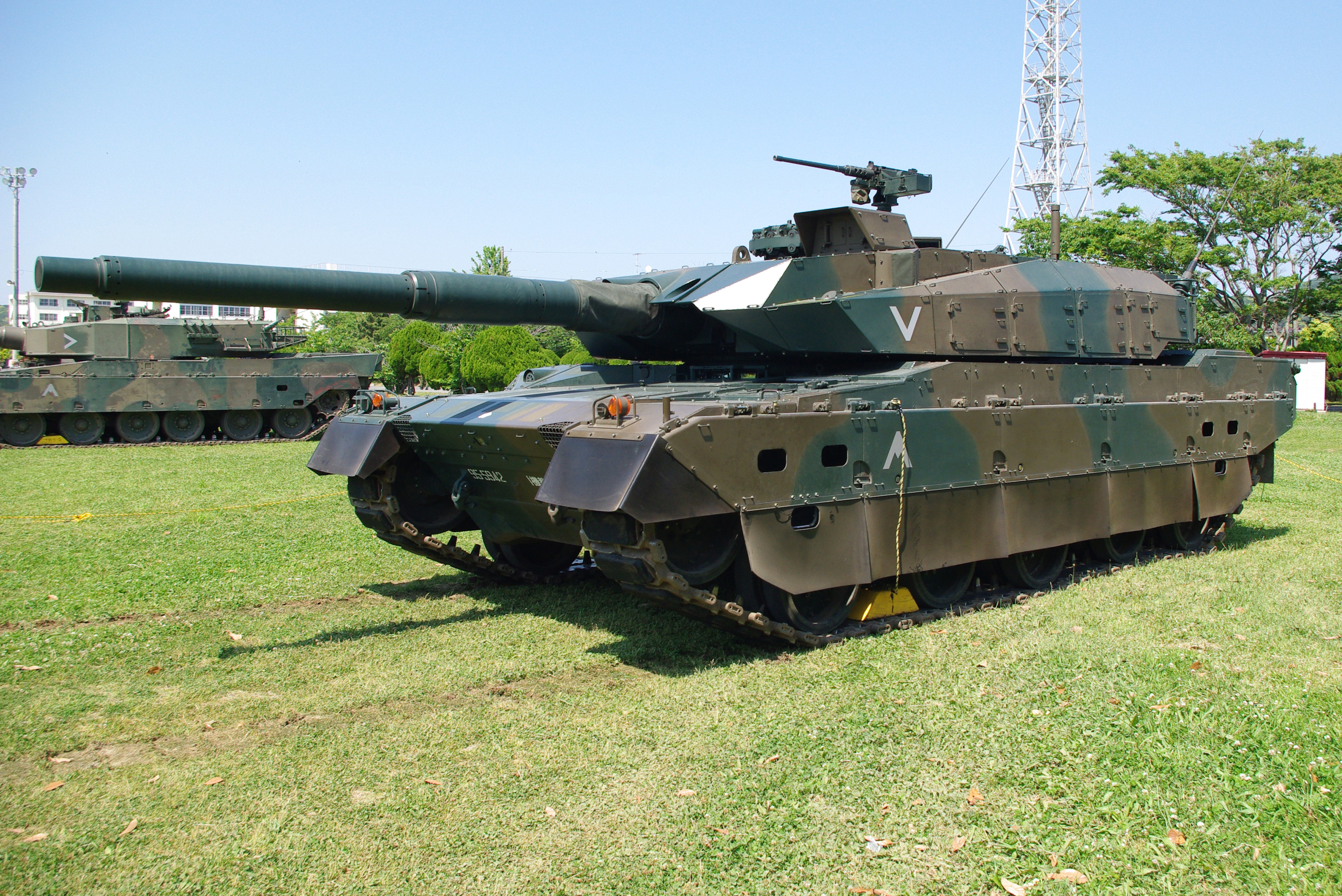
Type 10 tank 120 mm L44 smoothbore cannon developed by Japan Steel Works

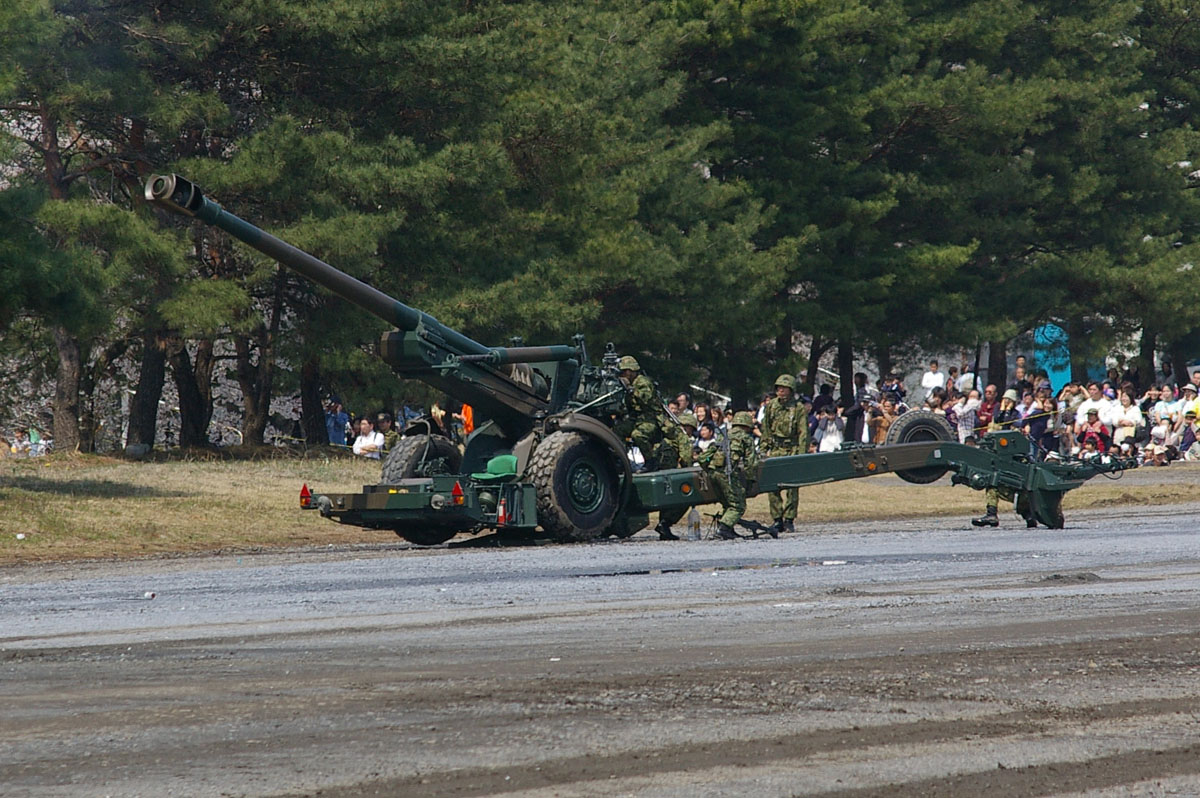
FH-70 Towed Howitzer built under license by Japan Steel Works for the JGSDF

== See also ==
- Dalfram dispute of 1938 over the export of pig iron from Australia to Japan Steel Works, then producing military materials for the undeclared war in China
