= Northern Army (Japan) =

- Northern Army Distinctive Unit Insignia
- Active: 15 October 1952 – present
- Country: Japan
- Branch: Japan Ground Self-Defense Force
- Type: Field army
- Garrison/HQ: Camp Sapporo, Sapporo, Hokkaidō

Commanders
- Current commander: Lt. Gen. Toshiya Okabe

The Northern Army (北部方面隊, Hokubu Hōmentai) is one of five active Armies of the Japan Ground Self-Defense Force (JGSDF). It is headquartered at Camp Sapporo in Sapporo, Hokkaidō and its responsibility is the defense of the island of Hokkaidō. It is the largest Army of the JGSDF as on Hokkaidō population and geographic constraints are less limiting than elsewhere in Japan. Most of JGSDF's modern Type 90 tank squadrons are located within the Northern Army's structure.

== Organization ==
- Northern Army, at Camp Sapporo in Sapporo
  - 2nd Division, at Camp Asahikawa in Asahikawa, responsible for the defense of North Western Hokkaidō
    - 2nd Tank Regiment, at Camp Kamifurano in Kamifurano
    - 3rd Rapid Deployment Regiment, at Camp Nayoro in Nayoro
    - 25th Infantry Regiment, at Camp Engaru in Engaru
    - 26th Infantry Regiment, at Camp Rumoi in Rumoi
    - 2nd Artillery Regiment, at Camp Asahikawa in Asahikawa
  - 5th Brigade, at Camp Obihiro in Obihiro, responsible for the defense of North Eastern Hokkaidō
    - 4th Infantry Regiment, at Camp Obihiro in Obihiro
    - 6th Rapid Deployment Regiment, at Camp Bihoro in Bihoro
    - 27th Infantry Regiment, at Camp Kushiro in Kushiro
  - 7th Division (Armored), at Camp Higashi Chitose in Chitose, responsible for the defense of Southern Hokkaidō
    - 11th Infantry Regiment (Mechanized), at Camp Higashi-Chitose in Chitose
    - 71st Tank Regiment, at Camp Kita-Chitose in Chitose
    - 72nd Tank Regiment, at Camp Kita-Eniwa in Eniwa
    - 73rd Tank Regiment, at Camp Minami-Eniwa in Eniwa
    - 7th Artillery Regiment, at Camp Higashi-Chitose in Chitose
  - 11th Brigade, at Camp Makomanai in Sapporo, responsible for the defense of South Western Hokkaidō
    - 10th Rapid Deployment Regiment, at Camp Takikawa in Takikawa
    - 18th Infantry Regiment (Mechanized), at Camp Makomanai in Minami-ku, Sapporo
    - 28th Infantry Regiment, at Camp Hakodate in Hakodate
  - 1st Artillery Brigade, at Camp Kita Chitose in Chitose
    - 1st Artillery Regiment (Mechanized), at Camp Kita Chitose in Chitose
    - 1st Surface-to-Ship Missile Regiment, at Camp Kita Chitose in Chitose
    - 2nd Surface-to-Ship Missile Regiment, at Camp Bibai in Bibai
    - 3rd Surface-to-Ship Missile Regiment, at Camp Kamifurano in Kamifurano
  - 1st Anti-Aircraft Artillery Brigade, at Camp Higashi Chitose in Chitose
    - 1st Anti-Aircraft Artillery Group, at Camp Higashi Chitose in Chitose (MIM-23 Hawk)
    - 4th Anti-Aircraft Artillery Group, at Camp Nayoro in Nayoro (MIM-23 Hawk)
    - 101st Unmanned Aerial Vehicles Battery (Target Towing), at Camp Shizunai in Shinhidaka
  - Northern Army Air Corps, at Camp Okadama in Sapporo
    - 1st Anti-tank Helicopter Battalion, at Camp Obihiro in Obihiro
    - Northern Army Helicopter Battalion, in Sapporo
    - Northern Army Air Traffic Control and Meteorological Company, in Sapporo
    - Northern Army Airfield Maintenance Company, in Sapporo
  - Northern Army Combined Brigade (Training), at Camp Higashi Chitose
    - 52nd Infantry Regiment (Reserve), at Camp Makomanai in Sapporo
    - 1st Non-Commissioned Officer Training Battalion, at Camp Higashi Chitose
    - 120th Training Battalion, at Camp Makomanai in Sapporo
    - Winter Warfare Training Unit, at Camp Makomanai in Sapporo
  - 3rd Engineer Brigade, at Camp Eniwa in Eniwa
    - 12th Engineer Group (Construction), at Camp Iwamizawa in Iwamizawa
    - 13th Engineer Group (Construction), at Camp Horobetsu in Noboribetsu
    - 14th Engineer Group (Construction), at Camp Kamifurano in Kamifurano
    - 105th Equipment Battalion, at Camp Eniwa in Eniwa
    - 303rd Vehicle Company, at Camp Eniwa in Eniwa
  - Northern Army Signals Regiment, at Camp Sapporo in Sapporo
    - 101st Base Systems Signals Battalion, at Camp Sapporo in Sapporo
    - 101st Command Post Signals Battalion, at Camp Sapporo in Sapporo
    - 101st Central Signals Company, at Camp Sapporo in Sapporo
  - Northern Army Logistic Support, at Camp Shimamatsu in Eniwa
    - 101st General Support Battalion (supports the 7th Division), at Camp Shimamatsu in Eniwa
    - 102nd General Support Battalion (supports the 11th Brigade), at Camp Makomanai in Sapporo
    - 103rd General Support Battalion (supports the 2nd Division and 5th Brigade), at Camp Kamifurano in Kamifurano
    - 101st Artillery Support Battalion (supports the 1st Artillery Brigade), at Camp Kita-Chitose in Chitose
    - 101st Anti-Aircraft Support Battalion (supports the 1st Anti-Aircraft Artillery Brigade), at Camp Higashi Chitose in Chitose
    - 101st Engineer Support Battalion (supports the 3rd Engineer Brigade), at Camp Minami-Eniwa in Eniwa
    - 102nd Ammunition Battalion (Reserve), at Camp Kita-Chitose in Chitose
    - 104th Supply Battalion (Reserve), at Camp Shimamatsu in Eniwa
    - Northern Army Transport Battalion, at Camp Higashi Chitose in Chitose
    - 101st Signals Support Company (supports the Northern Army Signals Regiment), at Camp Sapporo in Sapporo
    - 301st Anti-Ship/Anti-Tank Support Company (supports the Northern Army Anti-tank/Anti-ship Company), at Camp Kutchan in Kutchan
    - 305th Infantry Support Company (supports the 52nd Infantry Regiment), at Camp Makomanai in Sapporo
  - Northern Army Intelligence Corps, at Camp Sapporo in Sapporo
    - 301st Coastal Observation Company, in Wakkanai
    - 302nd Coastal Observation Company, in Shibetsu
    - Northern Army Intelligence Collection Company, at Camp Kutchan in Kutchan
  - Northern Army Medical Corps, at Camp Makomanai in Sapporo
  - Northern Army Anti-tank/Anti-ship Company, at Camp Kutchan in Kutchan with 3x platoons with Type 96 multi-purpose missile systems
  - Northern Army Command Post Training Support Company, at Camp Higashi Chitose
  - Northern Army Accounting Company, at Camp Sapporo in Sapporo
  - Northern Army Band, at Camp Makomanai in Sapporo

Note: The Japanese Defense Intelligence Headquarters also has a classified SIGINT unit based at Camp Higashi Chitose.

=== Northern Army organization graphic ===
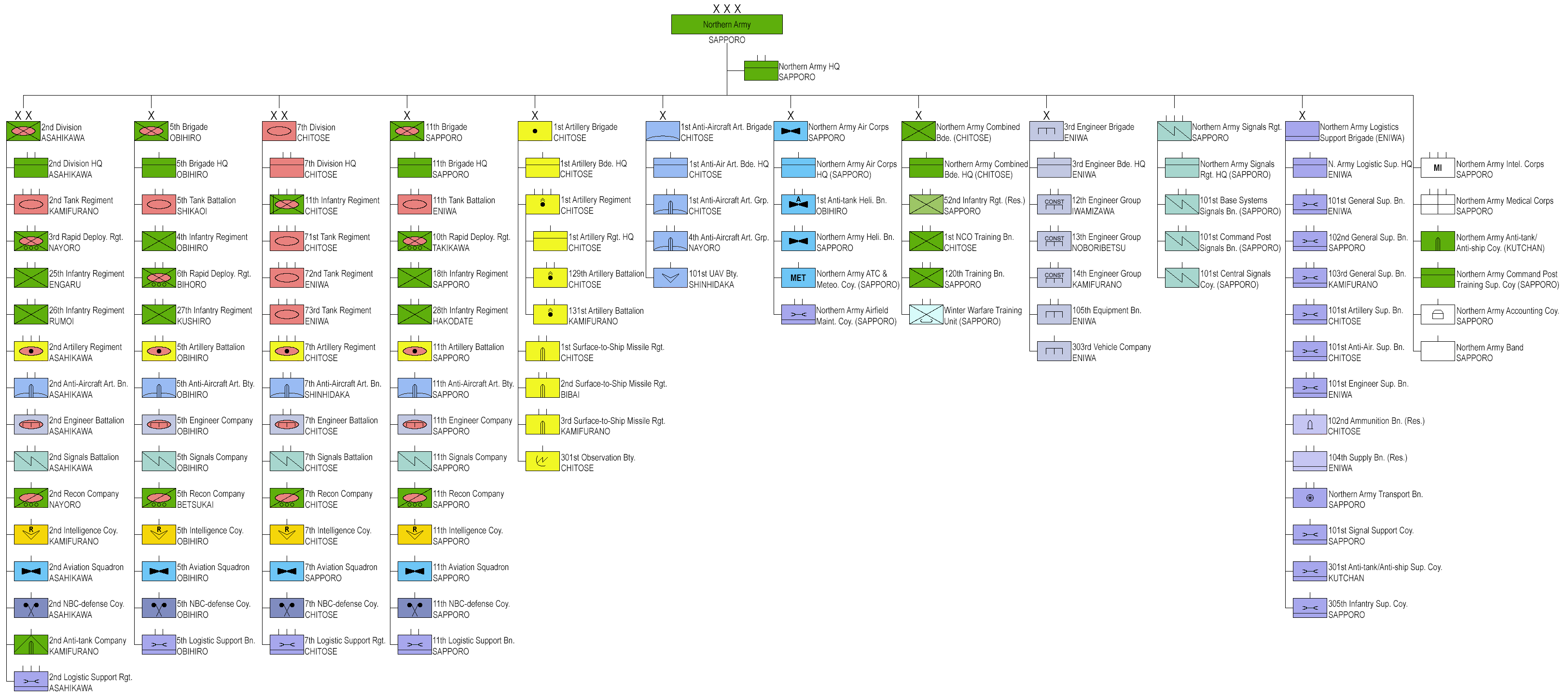
Northern Army organization as of March 2026 (click image to enlarge)
