= Type 75 =

Type 75 or 75th type may refer to:

- Type 075 landing helicopter dock (ship class) of the PRC's PLAN
- Type 75 155 mm self-propelled howitzer (cannon), a SPG of the Japanese Self Defence Force
- Type 75 130 mm multiple rocket launcher (tank), an AFV of the Japanese Self Defense Force
- Bristol Type 75, a British interwar transport biplane
- Lotus Type 75, a version of the Lotus Elite British sports car
- Tatra 75 also called Type 75, a Czech interwar motorcar

== See also ==
- T75 (disambiguation)
- Type (disambiguation)
- 75 (disambiguation)
- C75 (disambiguation)
- Class 75 (disambiguation)
- M75 (disambiguation)
- S75 (disambiguation)
