= T75 =

T75 may refer to:

== Military vehicles ==
- Hunter T 75, a British-built trainer aircraft
- INS Kalpeni (T75), a patrol vessel of the Indian Navy
- Sukhoi T-75 Checkmate, a Russian fighter jet project

== Weapons ==
- T-75 cannon, a Taiwanese 20mm rotary cannon
- T75 pistol, a Taiwanese pistol
- T75 Light machine gun, a Taiwanese light machine gun

== See also ==
- Type 75 (disambiguation)
- 75 (disambiguation)
- C75 (disambiguation)
- Class 75 (disambiguation)
- M75 (disambiguation)
- S75 (disambiguation)
