= 75th =

75th is the ordinal form of the number 75. Seventy-fifth or 75th may also refer to:

- A fraction, 1/75, equal to one of 75 equal parts
- 75th anniversary, also known as a Diamond jubilee
- 75th Academy Awards honored the best films of 2002, held on March 23, 2003
- 75th Grey Cup, the 1987 Canadian Football League championship game that was played at BC Place Stadium in Vancouver

== Geography ==
- 75th meridian east, a line of longitude
- 75th meridian west, a line of longitude
- 75th parallel north, a circle of latitude that is 75 degrees north of the Earth's equatorial plane
- 75th parallel south, a circle of latitude that is 75 degrees south of the Earth's equatorial plane
- 75th Police Precinct Station House, a historic police station located at Brooklyn in New York, New York
- 75th Avenue–61st Street Historic District, a national historic district in Ridgewood, Queens, New York
- 75th Street (disambiguation)

== Military ==
- 75th Air Base Wing, a unit of the United States Air Force
- 75th Battalion (Mississauga), CEF a unit of the Canadian Expeditionary Force
- 75th Brigade (disambiguation), several units
- 75th Division (disambiguation), several units
- 75th Regiment (disambiguation), several units
- 75th Squadron (disambiguation), several units

== Politics ==
- 75th Delaware General Assembly, a meeting of the legislative branch of the state government
- 75th Oregon Legislative Assembly, convened beginning on January 12, 2009, for its biennial regular session
- 75th United States Congress, a meeting of the legislative branch of the United States federal government
- California's 75th State Assembly district, one of 80 districts in the California State Assembly
- Virginia's 75th House of Delegates district, a political district for representation in Virginia's lower house

== Public transport ==
- 75th Avenue (IND Queens Boulevard Line), a local station of the New York City Subway
- 75th Street–Elderts Lane (BMT Jamaica Line), a skip-stop station of the New York City Subway
- 75th Street (Grand Crossing) station, an electrified commuter rail station along the Metra Electric Main Line in Chicago, Illinois

== Other ==
- 75th century
- 75th century BC

== See also ==
- 75 (disambiguation)
- Ankara 75th Anniversary Race Course, a horse racing track at Batıkent neighborhood in Yenimahalle district of Ankara, Turkey
- CMLL 75th Anniversary Show, a professional wrestling major show event produced in 2008 in Arena Mexico, Mexico City, Mexico
- Maserati Birdcage 75th, a concept car created by automobile manufacturer Maserati
- National Football League 75th Anniversary All-Time Team, chosen by a selection committee of media and league personnel in 1994
- AD 75, the year 75 (LXXV) of the Julian calendar
- 75 BC
