= LXXV Corps =

LXXV Corps or 75th Corps may refer to:

- LXXV Army Corps, Wehrmacht, Germany
- 75th (2nd Company, Leather and Boot Trade) Lanarkshire Rifle Volunteer Corps, United Kingdom

== See also ==
- List of military corps by number
- 75th Brigade (disambiguation)
- 75th Division (disambiguation)
- 75th Regiment (disambiguation)
- 75th (disambiguation)
