= 75th Cavalry =

75th Cavalry may refer to:

- 75th Cavalry Division, Soviet Union
- 75th Cavalry Regiment, United States

== See also ==
- 75th Division (disambiguation)
- 75th Brigade (disambiguation)
- 75th Regiment (disambiguation)
- 75th (disambiguation)
