= Type 74 =

Type 74 may refer to:

== Weaponry ==
- Type 74 tank, Japanese main battle tank
- Type 74 105 mm self-propelled howitzer, Japanese self propelled howitzer
- Type 74 anti-aircraft gun, Chinese twin barreled upgrade of M1939 anti air gun
