= 1875 (disambiguation) =

1875 may refer to:

- 1875, a number in the 1000 (number) range

== Time ==
- 1875 A.D. (MDCCCLXXV), a year in the Common Era
- 1875 BC, a year in the Before Common Era

== Places ==
- 1875 (1969 QQ) Neruda, the asteroid #1875, see List of minor planets: 1001–2000

== Other uses ==
- B1875.0, the Besselian epoch in astronomy
- Model 1875 (disambiguation)

== See also ==
- 75 (disambiguation)
