= 75D =

75D may refer to:

- HP-75D, handheld computer introduced in 1984
- Tesla Model X 75D, all-electric cross-over SUV (XUV/CUV)
- 75D/Kohoutek, a short-period comet discovered in February 1975 by Lubos Kohoutek

== See also ==
- D75 (disambiguation)
- 75 (disambiguation)
