= D75 =

D75 may refer to:

- a standard illuminant : see Standard illuminant#Illuminant series D
- D 75 road (United Arab Emirates)
- Neo-Grünfeld Defence, Encyclopaedia of Chess openings code

== See also ==
- 75D (disambiguation)
- 75 (disambiguation)
