= The 1975 (disambiguation) =

The 1975 are an English pop rock band formed in 2002.

The 1975 may also refer to:

- The 1975 (album), or the title track, 2013
- "The 1975" (song), from Notes on a Conditional Form, 2020
- "The 1975", a song from the 1975's 2016 album I Like It When You Sleep, for You Are So Beautiful yet So Unaware of It
- "The 1975", a song from the 1975's 2018 album A Brief Inquiry into Online Relationships
- "The 1975", a song from the 1975's 2022 album Being Funny in a Foreign Language

== See also ==
- 1975 (disambiguation)
