= Type 73 armored personnel carrier =

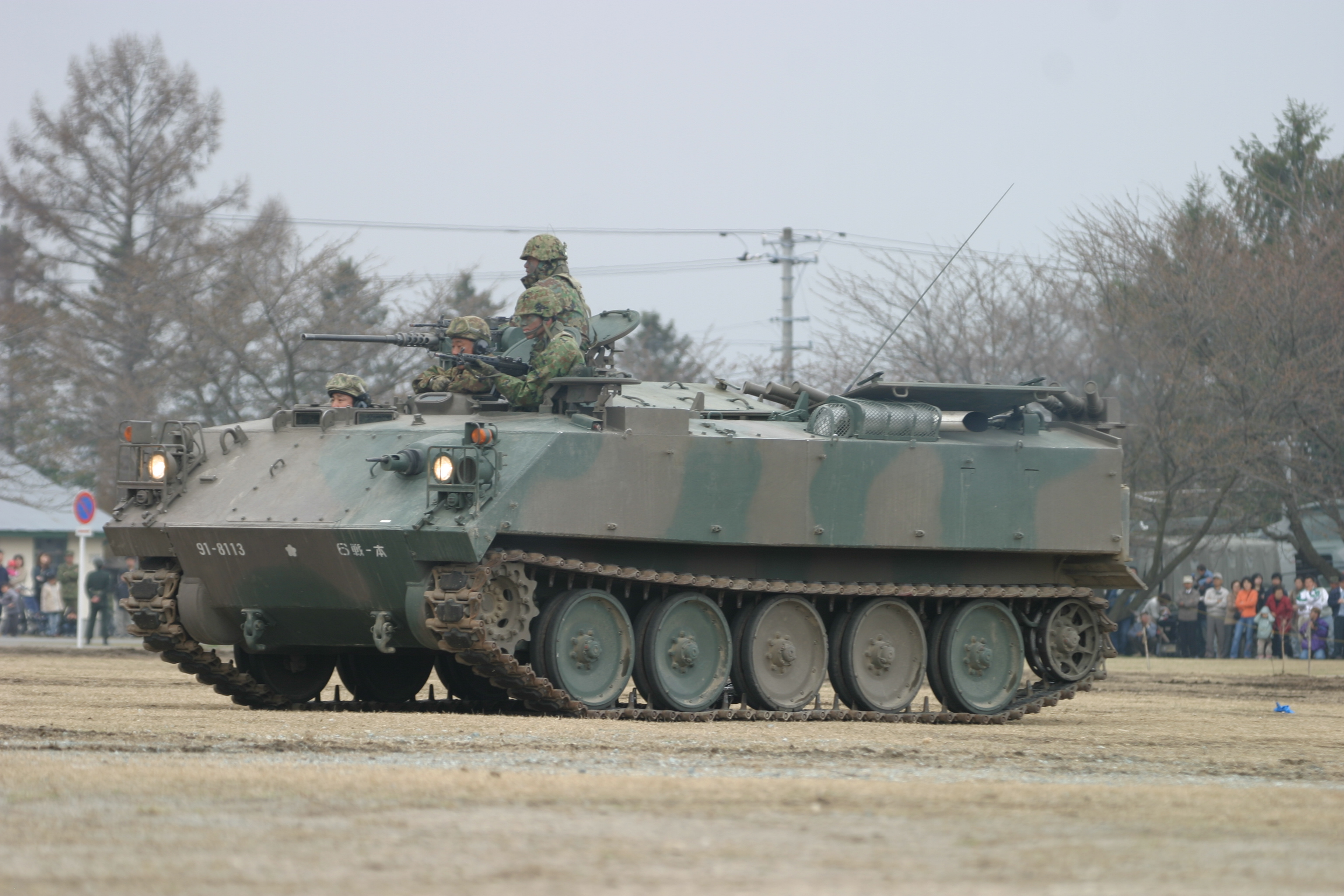
- A Type 73 armored personnel carrier of the Japan Ground Self-Defense Force at Camp Jinmachi
- Type: Armored personnel carrier
- Place of origin: Japan

Service history
- In service: 1973–…
- Used by: Japan Ground Self-Defense Force

Production history
- Designer: Technical Research and Development Institute
- Designed: 1967–1973
- Manufacturer: Mitsubishi Heavy Industries, Komatsu Limited
- Unit cost: ¥100 million
- Produced: 1973–1994
- No. built: 338
- Variants: See Variants

Specifications
- Mass: 13.3 t (14.7 short tons)
- Length: 5.80 m (19.0 ft)
- Width: 2.90 m (9.5 ft)
- Height: 2.21 m (7.3 ft)
- Crew: 4
- Passengers: 8
- Armor: Aluminium
- Main armament: 12.7 mm M2HB heavy machine gun
- Secondary armament: 7.62 mm Type 74 bow machine gun
- Engine: Mitsubishi 4ZF 2-stroke V4 air-cooled diesel 300 hp (220 kW) (2,200 rpm)
- Power/weight: 22.56 hp/t (16.82 kW/t)
- Transmission: Automatic (4 forward, 1 reverse gear)
- Suspension: Torsion bar
- Ground clearance: 0.4 m (16 in)
- Fuel capacity: 450 L (120 US gal)
- Operational range: 300 km (190 mi)
- Maximum speed: 60 km/h (37 mph) (road); 6 km/h (3.7 mph) (water)

The Type 73 armored personnel carrier (73式装甲車, nana-san-shiki-soukou-sya) is a Japanese tracked armored personnel carrier. Produced by Mitsubishi Heavy Industries, the vehicle entered service with the Japan Ground Self-Defense Force in 1973. As of 1996, the Type 73 is being supplemented and eventually replaced by the wheeled Type 96 armored personnel carrier.

== Development ==
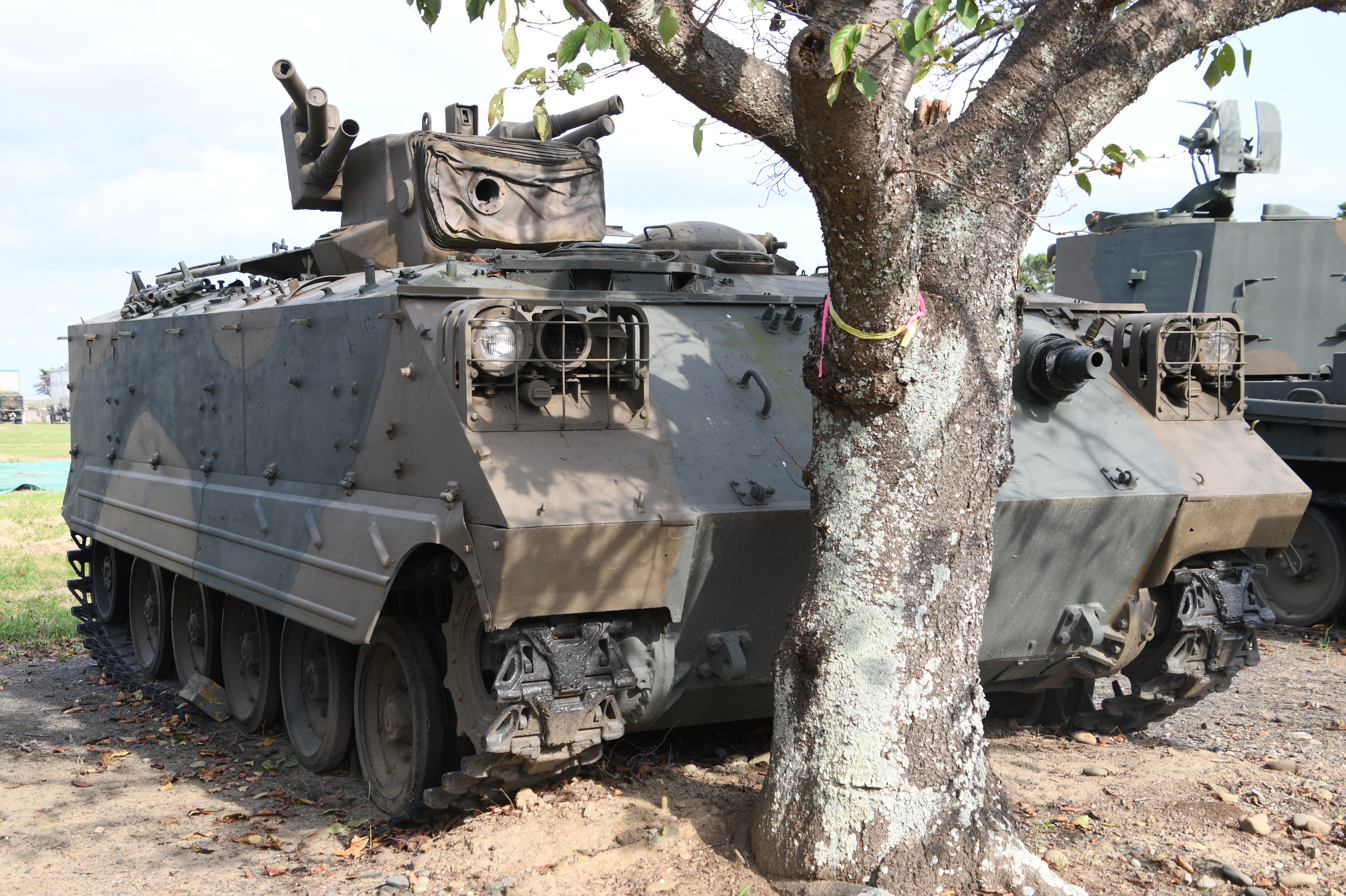
Komatsu's unsuccessful SUB 2 prototype with a turret for mounting a 20 mm autocannon at Camp Tsuchiura.

In 1967, the Defense Agency's Technical Research and Development Institute issued a requirement for a new armored personnel carrier to replace the Type 60. Concerns were raised that the Type 60 cannot be equipped with nuclear, biological, and chemical protection equipment. The requirements included a maximum speed of over 60 km/h (37 mph), ability to carry 12 men including the crew, being fully amphibious, having all-welded aluminium armor, provision for the infantry to use their small arms from inside the vehicle, and being armed with a 20 mm autocannon, a 12.7 mm heavy machine gun, and a 7.62 mm machine gun.

Developing the engine began before the vehicle prototyping efforts. Mitsubishi developed the ZF series air-cooled diesel engines with the aim of increasing parts commonality between Japan Ground Self-Defense vehicles. Depending on the platform power requirements, an engine with the appropriate number of cylinders was selected. For example, the Type 74 tank used the 10-cylinder 10ZF, the Type 75 155 mm self-propelled howitzer utilised the 6-cylinder 6ZF, and the 4-cylinder 4ZF was mounted on the Type 73 and the Type 74 105 mm self-propelled howitzer.

Partial prototyping for the vehicle started in 1967. An automotive test rig, called the SUT, was completed in 1968. Mitsubishi Heavy Industries (SUB 1) and Komatsu Limited (SUB 2) each built two prototypes the following year. Both competitors manufactured prototypes with aluminium and steel armour.

Mitsubishi's aluminium model was chosen for operational use and standardised as the Type 73 in December 1973. Mitsubishi was the prime contractor and the tracks were made by Komatsu, while Hitachi was in charge of manufacturing the vehicle's transmission system.

During development, mounting a 20 mm autocannon was also tested. The autocannon would have been produced under licence from Rheinmetall. However, plans to install an autocannon on production vehicles were postponed and eventually cancelled due to associated costs.

Serial production of the Type 73 started in 1973. By 1994, a total of 338 vehicles had been produced. The Type 96 armored personnel carrier is slowly replacing the Type 73 in Japan Ground Self-Defence Force service, although 220 vehicles remain in use by 2024.

== Design ==
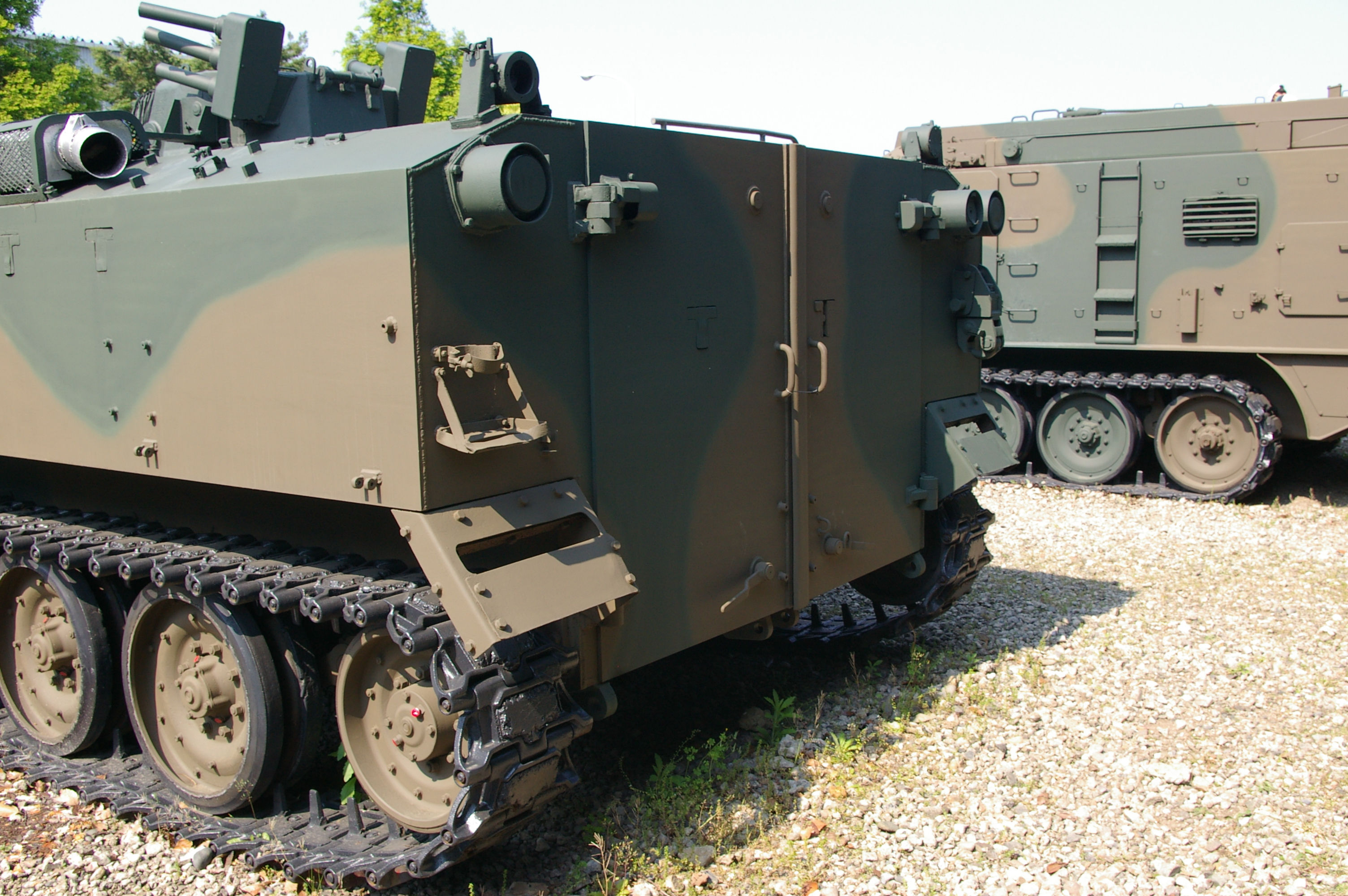
A rear view of a Type 73 showing the smoke grenade launchers and the firing ports in the rear doors.

The Type 73 has an uncommon mid-engined layout, as the driver, commander, and bow machine gunner are in the front of the vehicle. The commander sits between the driver and the machine gunner. The troop compartment is in the rear of the vehicle, which can be accessed through two large rear doors or a large two-part roof hatch.

The Mitsubishi 4ZF two-stroke air-cooled V4 diesel engine is mounted on the left side behind the bow gunner, with both its air intake and exhaust on the top of the vehicle. The engine and transmission are designed to be easily removed as one complete unit. The Type 73 is equipped with three smoke grenade launchers in the rear on the left and right side.

The Type 73 has a 12.7 mm M2HB heavy machine gun with 600 rounds of ammunition and a 7.62 mm Type 74 bow machine gun with 4,500 rounds available. The M2HB heavy machine gun can be operated remotely from within the vehicle, but it has little elevation as a consequence and is of limited use against aerial threats. The gunner's cupola can traverse a full 360°, but the bow gunner's weapon can only traverse, elevate, and depress 30°. The mounted infantry can fire their personal weapons from inside the vehicle through six T-shaped firing ports. The eight troops are seated on four folding seats on both sides of the rear of the vehicle facing each other.

While the Type 73 is amphibious, it requires additional equipment for travelling on water. Preparation for amphibious operations takes about 30 minutes, after which the Type 73 is able to traverse water bodies propelled by its tracks at 6 km/h (3.7 mph). The Type 73 is fitted with infra-red driving lights, can be equipped with a passive periscope for night driving, and has a nuclear, biological, and chemical protection system as standard equipment.

== Variants ==
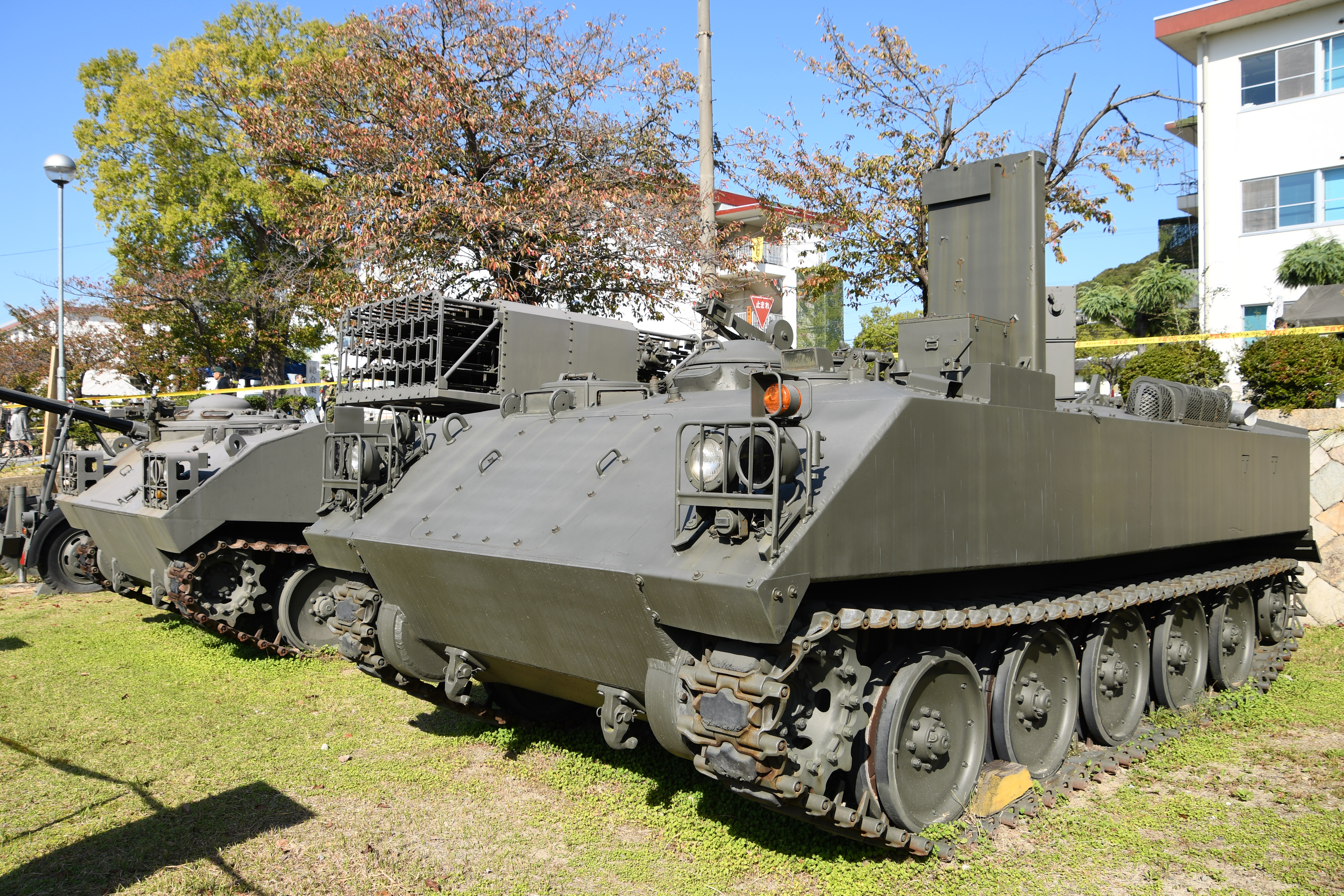
Both the Type 75 wind measurement vehicle (front) and the Type 75 130 mm multiple rocket launcher (back) use a modified Type 73 chassis.

There are not many formal variants of the Type 73. A command version is in service, which can be distinguished from the original version by its raised roof. However, the chassis has been adapted for multiple purposes.

Vehicles that use a modified Type 73 chassis include:

- The Type 74 105 mm self-propelled howitzer, produced by Komatsu, which used a version of the Type 73 chassis that shared components with Komatsu's SUB 2 prototype.
- The Type 75 130 mm multiple rocket launcher, manufactured by Komatsu, with a chassis that utilised components from Komatsu's SUB 2 prototype.
- The Type 75 155 mm self-propelled howitzer, which was produced by Mitsubishi.
- The Type 75 wind measurement vehicle, manufactured by Komatsu, which supported the Type 75 130 mm multiple rocket launcher in service.

In addition, the Type 76 counter-battery radar system includes a vehicle built by Komatsu that uses a modified Type 74 105 mm self-propelled howitzer chassis, itself a derivative of the Type 73. The Acquisition, Technology & Logistics Agency has also adapted a Type 73 chassis for testing hybrid electric propulsion.

== Gallery ==
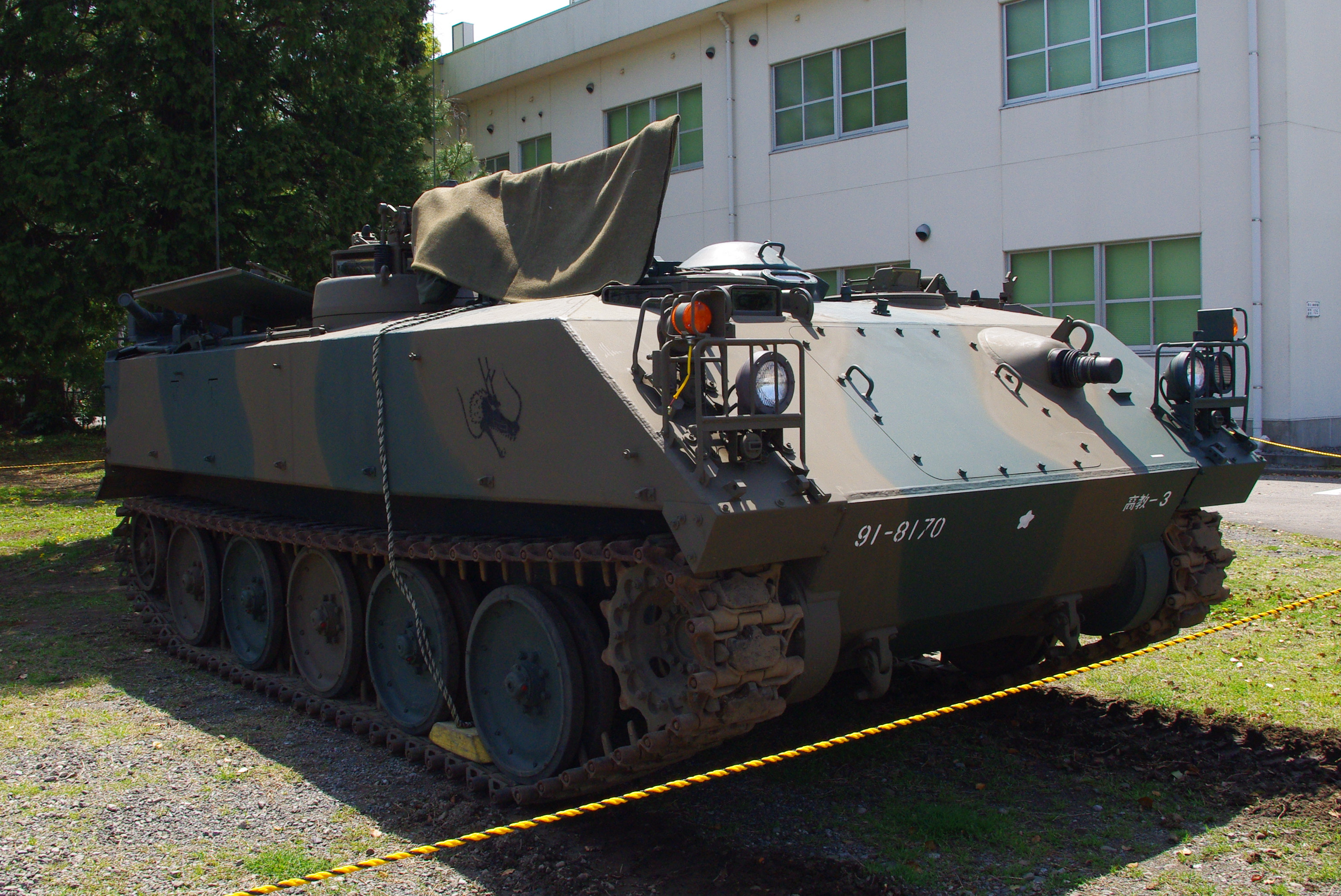
A front right view of the Type 73 at Camp Shimoshizu

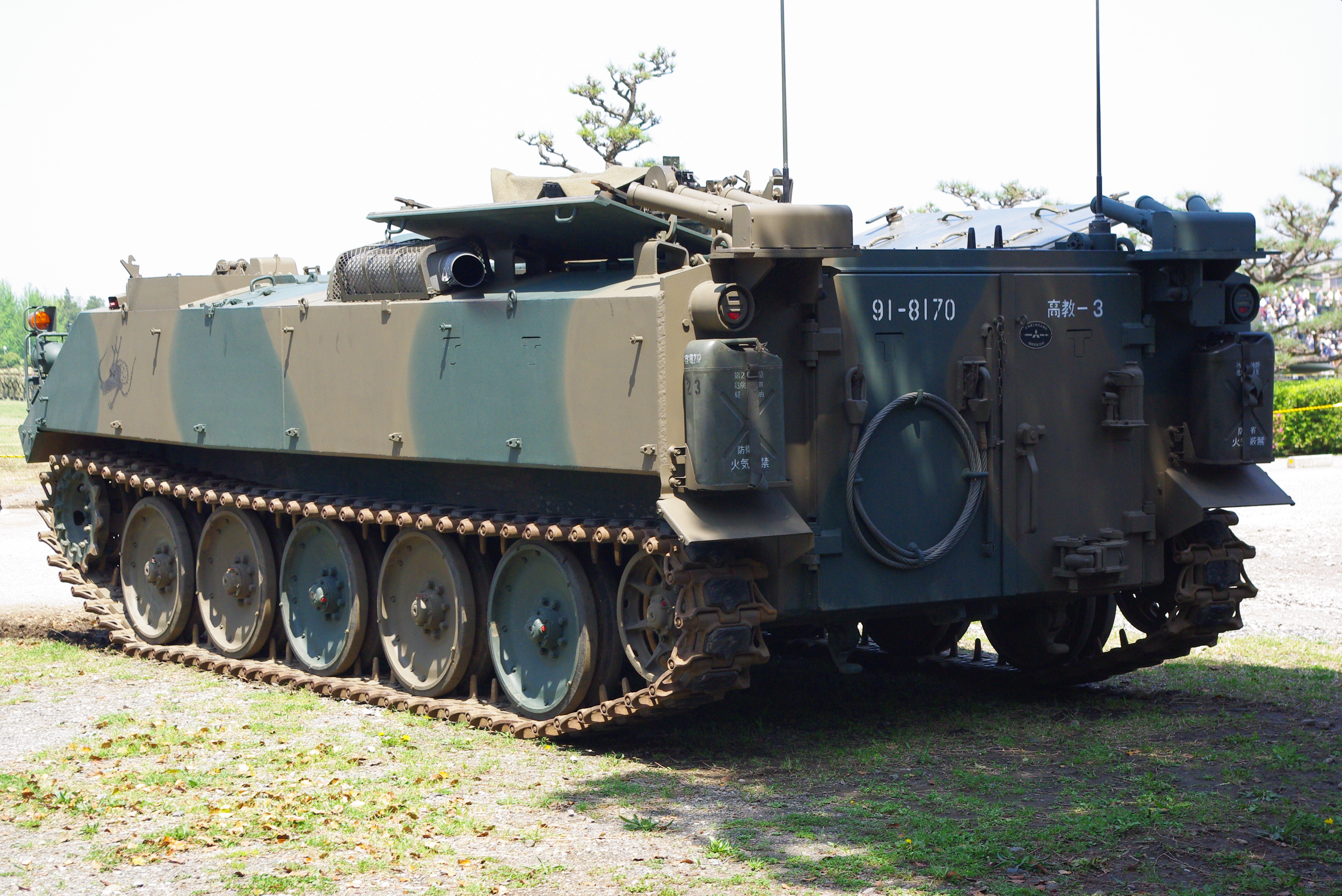
A left rear view of the Type 73 at Camp Shimoshizu

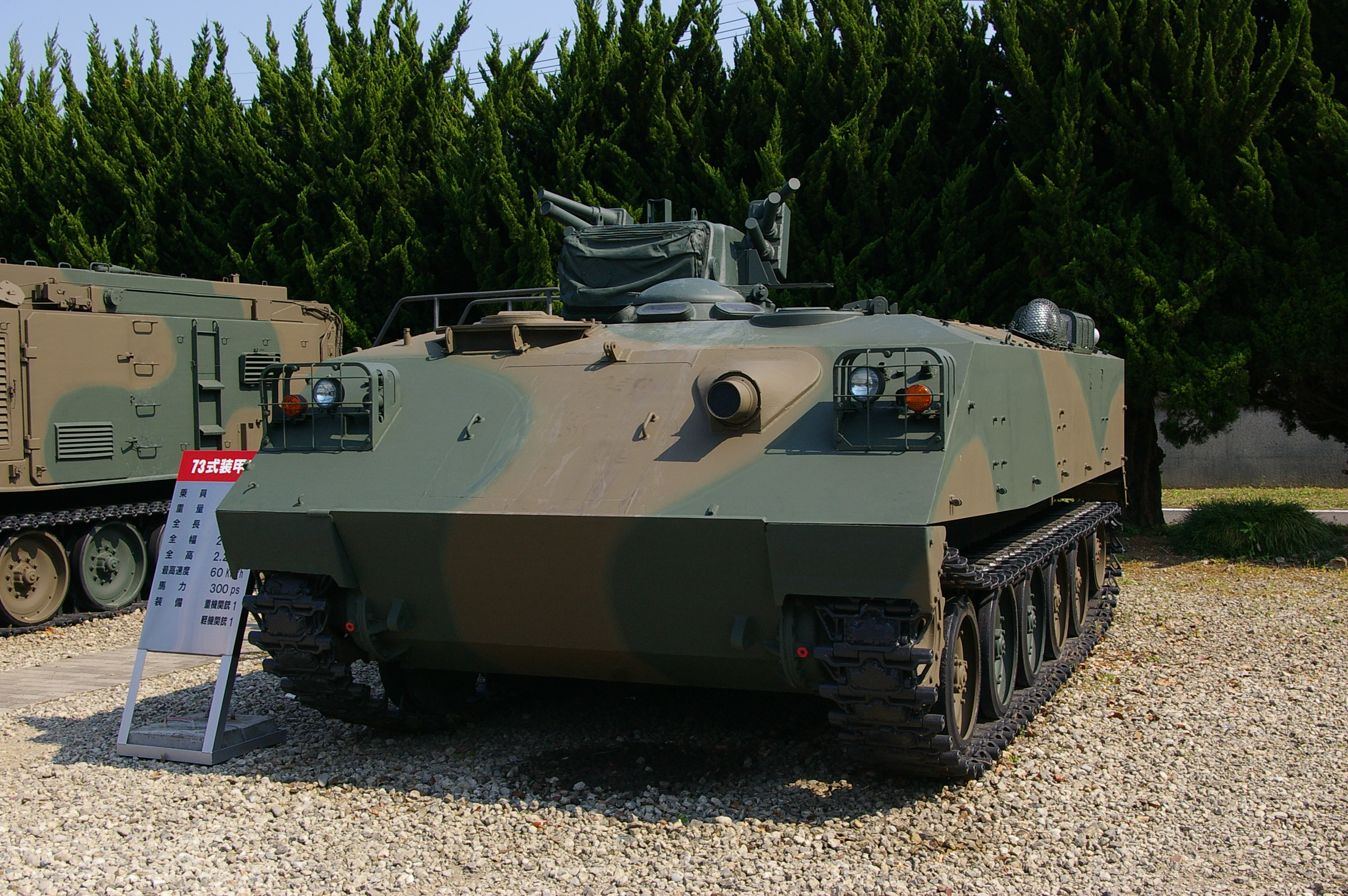
Mitsubishi's SUB 1 prototype with a turret for a 20 mm autocannon at Camp Kasumigaura

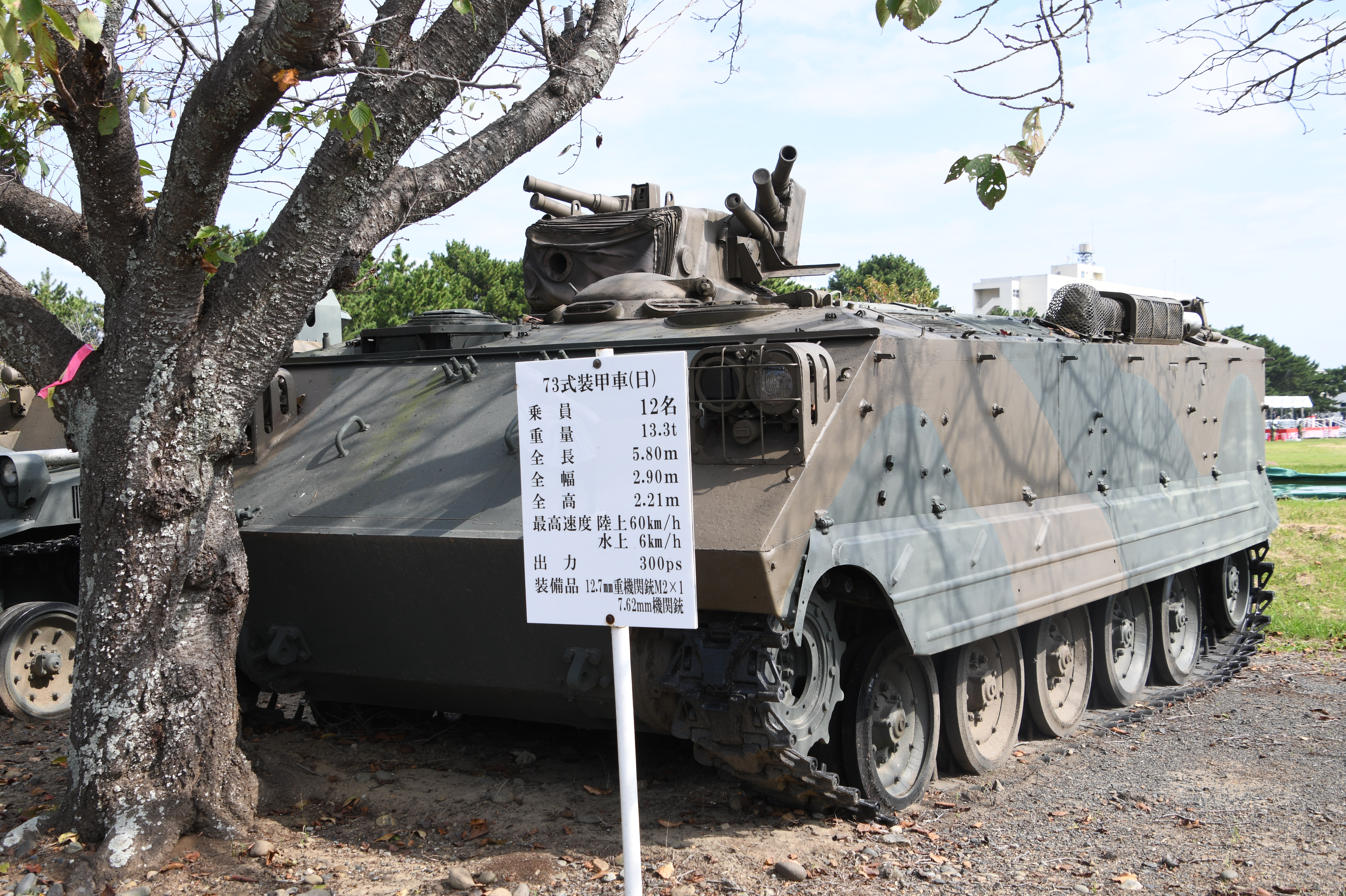
Komatsu's SUB 2 prototype with a turret for a 20 mm autocannon at Camp Tsuchiura

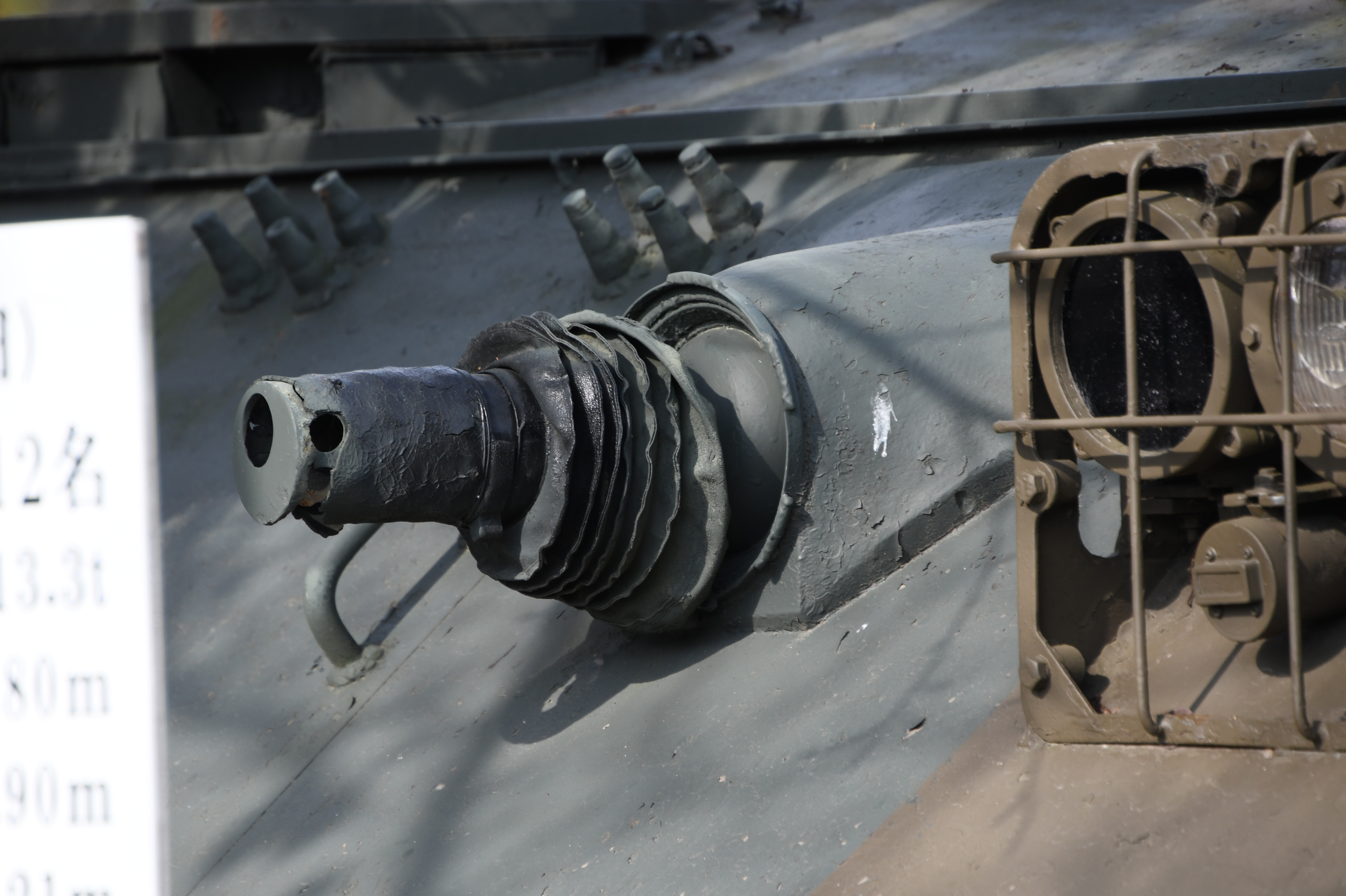
A close-up view of the 7.62 mm bow machine gun mount on Komatsu's SUB 2 prototype at Camp Tsuchiura

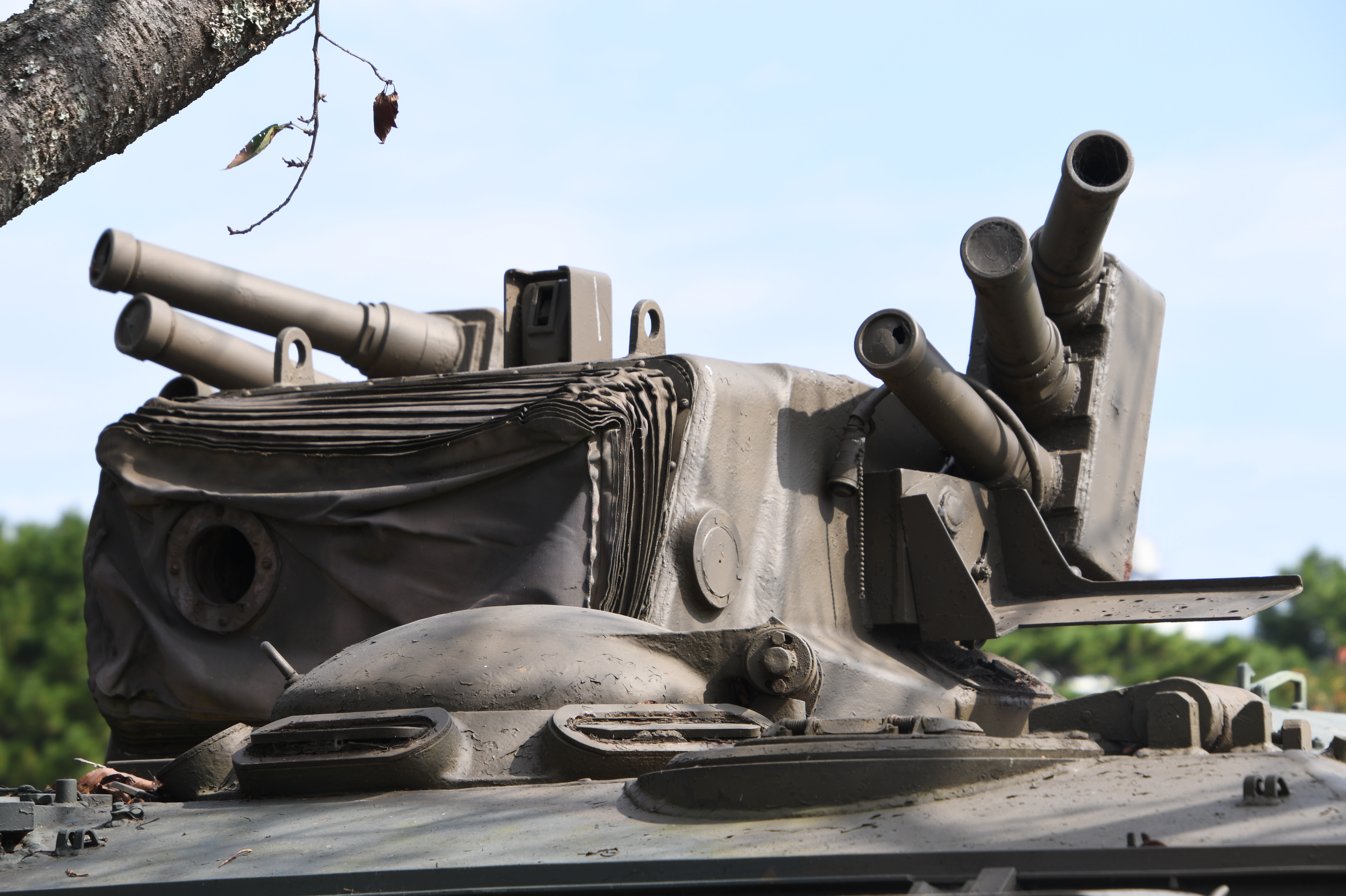
A close-up view of the turret for a 20 mm autocannon on Komatsu's SUB 2 prototype at Camp Tsuchiura

== Operators ==
- Japan: 220 operational as of 2024, primarily in the 7th Division and in small numbers in the 8th Division for disaster response purposes, while being superseded by the Type 96 in the armored personnel carrier role.

== Similar vehicles ==
- FV432 – (United Kingdom)
- Leonidas-2 – (Greece)
- M113 – (United States)
- MT-LB – (Soviet Union)
- Pansarbandvagn 302 – (Sweden)
- Saurer 4K 4FA – (Austria)
- Type 63 – (China)

== See also ==
- List of equipment of the Japan Ground Self-Defense Force
