= Model 1875 =

Model 1875 (M1875) may refer to:

- Remington Model 1875 Single Action Army revolver handgun
- Springfield Model 1875 Officer's Rifle longgun
- M1875 mountain gun, U.S. Army Hotchkiss fieldgun

== See also ==
- 1875 (disambiguation)
- M1975 (disambiguation)
- M75 (disambiguation)
