= 75th Regiment of Foot (disambiguation) =

Five regiments of the British Army have been numbered the 75th Regiment of Foot:

- 75th Regiment of Foot (1745), or Viscount Falmouth's Cornish Regiment of Foot, raised in 1745 and disbanded in 1746
- 75th Regiment of Foot (1758), formed 1758 and disbanded 1763
- 75th Regiment of Foot (Invalids), renumbered from the 118th in 1763
- 75th Regiment of Foot (Prince of Wales's Regiment), raised in 1778 and disbanded in 1783
- 75th (Stirlingshire) Regiment of Foot, raised in 1787, later 1st battalion Gordon Highlanders
