= M1975 =

M-1975 may refer to:

- 2S4 Tyulpan, a Soviet self-propelled 240mm mortar
- 2S7 Pion, a Soviet self-propelled 203mm gun
- M-1975, a North Korean self-propelled 130mm gun (Type 59-1) gun on a locally built chassis

== See also ==
- Model 1875 (disambiguation) -- M-1875
- M75 (disambiguation)
- 1975 (disambiguation)
