= 75th Division =

75th Division or 75th Infantry Division may refer to:

== Infantry divisions ==
- 75th Division (People's Republic of China)
- 75th Reserve Division, German Empire
- 75th Infantry Division (Wehrmacht), Germany
- 75th Infantry Division (Russian Empire)
- 75th Infantry Division (South Korea)
- 75th Guards Rifle Division, Soviet Union
- 75th Rifle Division (Soviet Union), part of 4th Army
- 75th Division (United Kingdom)
- 75th Infantry Division (United States)

== Cavalry divisions ==
- 75th Cavalry Division, Soviet Union

== Armoured divisions ==
- 75th Guards Tank Division, Soviet Union

== See also ==
- List of military divisions by number
- 75th Brigade (disambiguation)
- 75th Regiment (disambiguation)
- 75th Squadron (disambiguation)
