= 1975 (disambiguation) =

1975 was a common year starting on Wednesday of the Gregorian calendar.

1975 may also refer to:

- A number in the 1000 (number) range

== Places ==
- 1975 (1969 PH) Pikelner; the asteroid #1975, see List of minor planets: 1001–2000

== Other ==
- "1975", a song by Gene Clark from his album White Light
- The 1975, an English pop rock band formed in 2002

== See also ==
- The 1975 (disambiguation)
- M1975 (disambiguation)
