= Type 75 155 mm self-propelled howitzer =

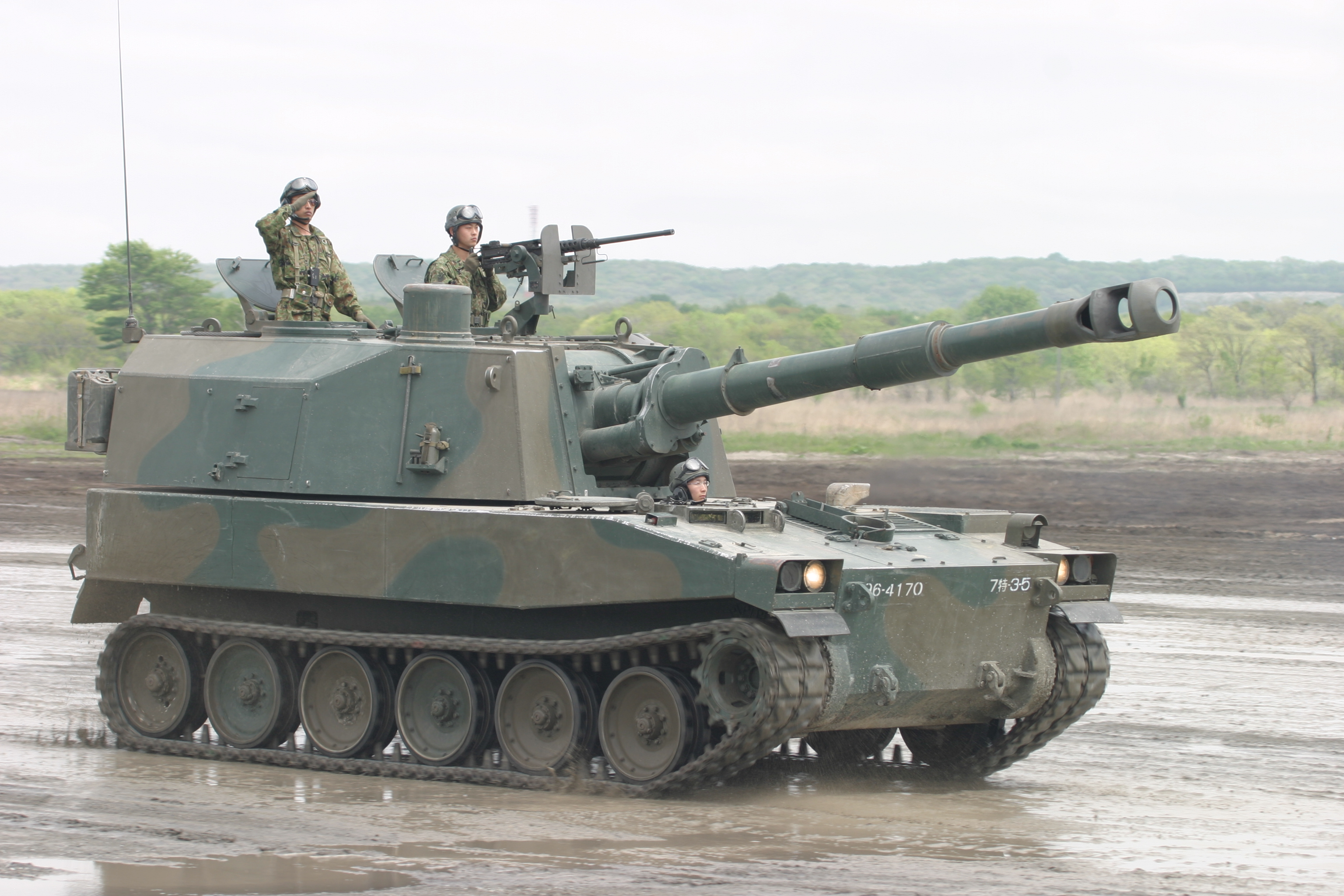
- A Type 75 155 mm self-propelled howitzer of the Japan Ground Self-Defense Force displayed at Camp Higasichitose
- Type: Self-propelled howitzer
- Place of origin: Japan

Service history
- In service: 1975–2014
- Used by: Japan Ground Self-Defense Force

Production history
- Designer: Technical Research and Development Institute
- Designed: 1969–1975
- Manufacturer: Mitsubishi Heavy Industries (chassis), Japan Steel Works (gun, turret)
- Produced: 1977–1985
- No. built: 201

Specifications
- Mass: 25.3 tonnes (24.9 long tons; 27.9 short tons)
- Length: 7.79 m (25.6 ft) (gun forward); 6.64 m (21.8 ft) (hull)
- Barrel length: 4.65 m (183 in) (30 calibers)
- Width: 2.98 m (9.8 ft)
- Height: 2.55 m (8.4 ft)
- Crew: 6 (commander, driver, two gunners, layer, and radio operator)
- Shell: separate-loading, bagged charge
- Caliber: 155 mm (6.1 in)
- Elevation: −5° to +65°
- Traverse: 360°
- Rate of fire: 6 rpm
- Muzzle velocity: 720 m/s (2,400 ft/s)
- Effective firing range: 19,000 m (21,000 yd) (HE)
- Maximum firing range: 24,000 m (26,000 yd) (rocket-assisted)
- Sights: direct- and indirect-fire
- Armor: aluminium
- Main armament: Japan Steel Works Type 75 155 mm L/30 howitzer (28 rounds)
- Secondary armament: 12.7mm Browning M2HB (1,000 rounds)
- Engine: Mitsubishi 6ZF21WT V-type 6-cylinder turbocharged diesel 450 hp (340 kW) (2,200 rpm)
- Power/weight: 17.8 hp/t (13.3 kW/t)
- Suspension: torsion bar
- Ground clearance: 0.4 m (16 in)
- Fuel capacity: 650 L (170 US gal)
- Operational range: 300 km (190 mi)
- Maximum speed: 47 km/h (29 mph)

The Type 75 155 mm self-propelled howitzer (75式自走155mm榴弾砲, nana-go-shiki-jisou-155mm-ryuudan-hou) was an armoured artillery vehicle exclusively used by the Japan Ground Self-Defense Force. It entered service in 1975 alongside the Type 74 105 mm self-propelled howitzer, with both vehicles sharing automotive components. All 201 Type 75s were retired by March 2014 and replaced by the Type 99 155 mm self-propelled howitzer.

== Development ==
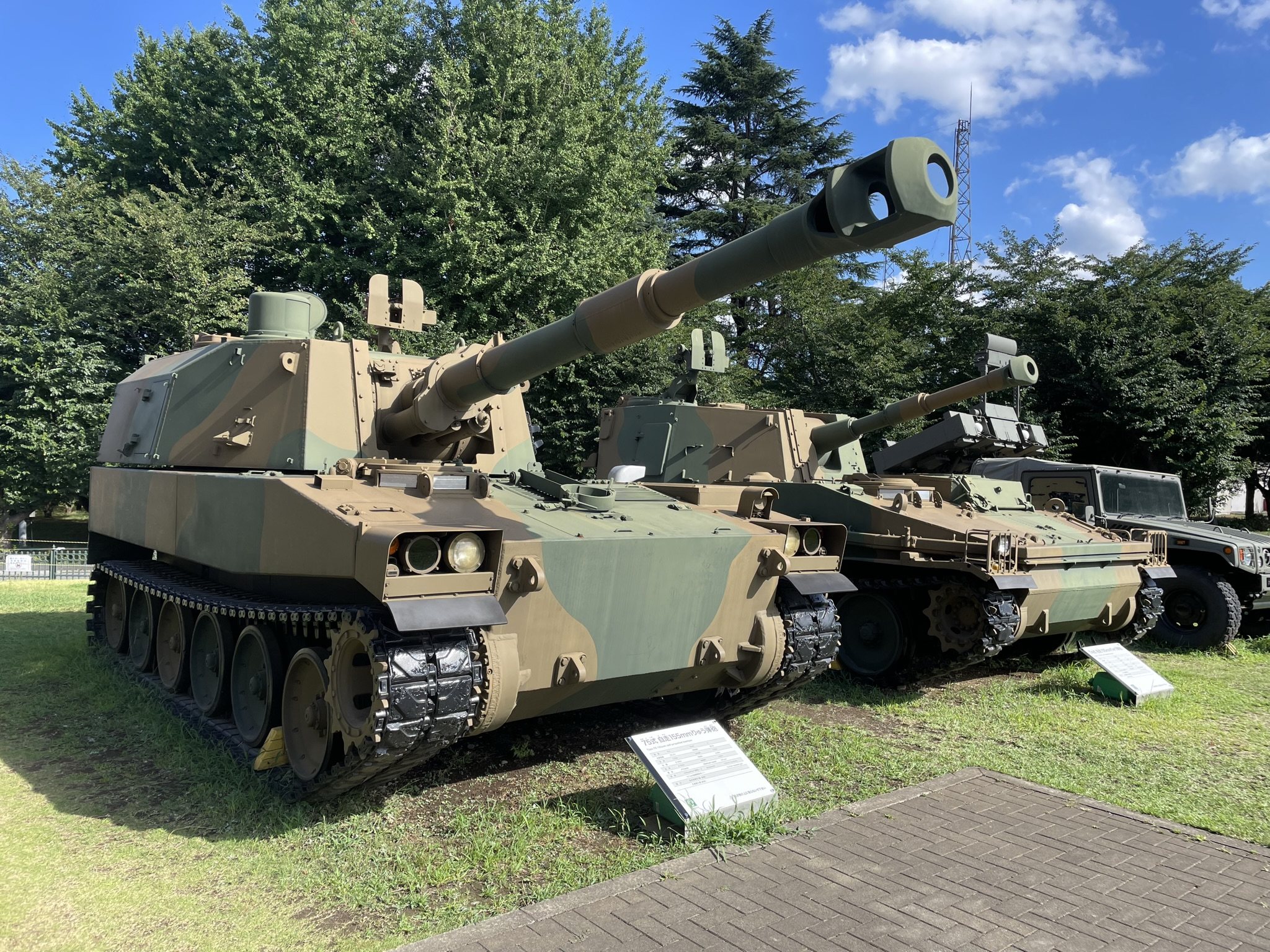
The Type 75 155 mm self-propelled howitzer (left) shared automotive components with the Type 74 105 mm self-propelled howitzer (right).

The Type 75 was developed in parallel with the Type 74 105 mm self-propelled howitzer. The Type 74 fulfilled the close-range fire support role and the Type 75 provided long-range indirect fire support. Initial specifications for the Type 75 were drafted in 1965, finalised in 1968, and the Technical Research and Development Institute began research and preliminary prototyping in 1969. Mitsubishi Heavy Industries built the chassis and Japan Steel Works developed the turret. Full prototype production began in 1971.

Two prototypes were completed in 1972, differing in their main gun loading systems. Both short-barrelled (24-caliber) and long-barrelled (30-caliber) 155 mm howitzer guns were prototyped, with the long-barrelled version selected for production. Prototypes were also equipped with a rear spade to absorb recoil, although trials showed that the spade was unnecessary and was omitted from the production version.

Technical testing began in 1972 and field trials were conducted in 1973–1974. After trials, the vehicle was adopted for use and was standardised as the Type 75 155 mm self-propelled howitzer in October 1975.

== Characteristics ==
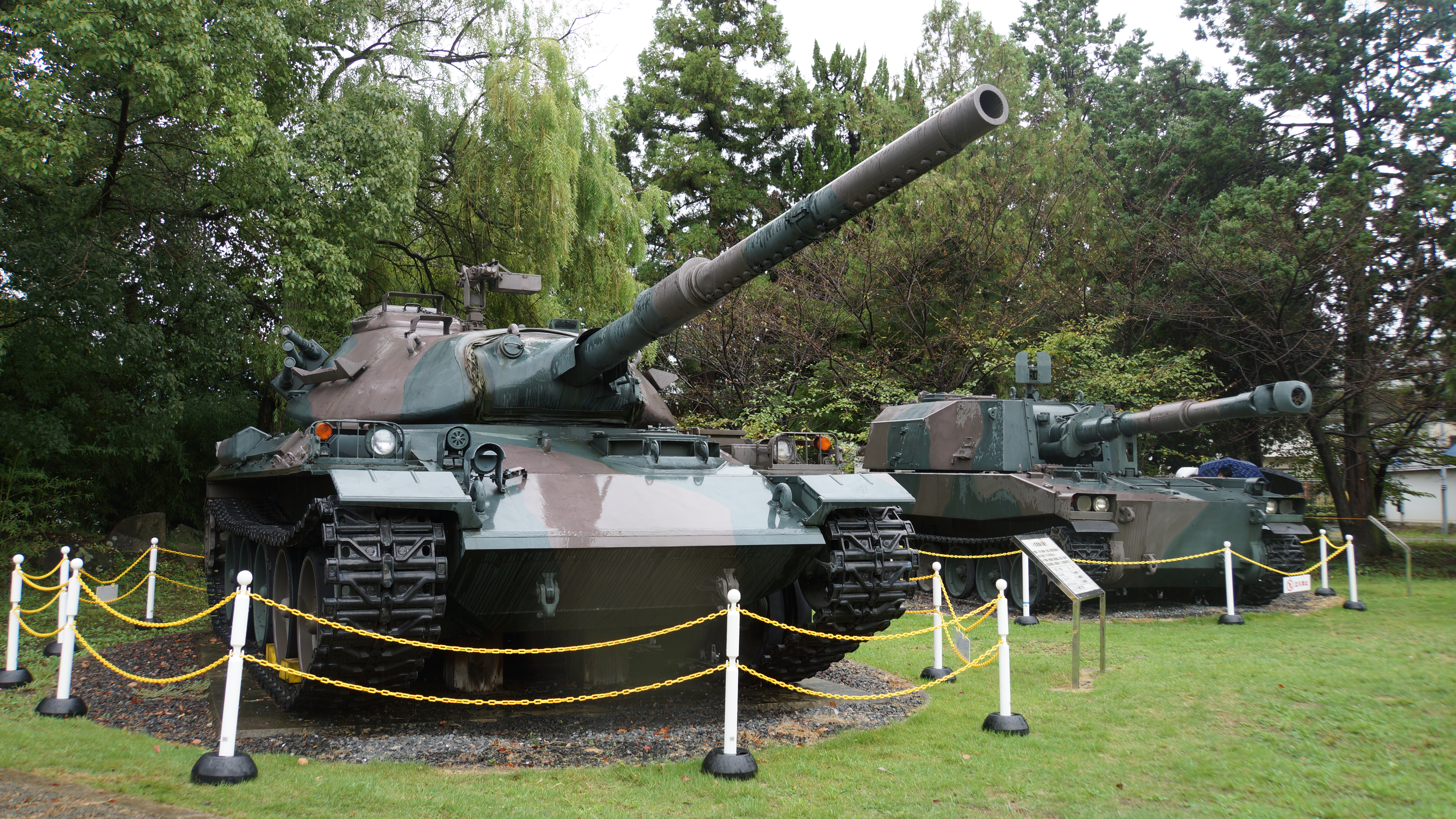
The Type 75 155 mm self-propelled howitzer (right), Type 75 130 mm multiple rocket launcher, Type 74 tank, Type 74 self-propelled howitzer, and Type 73 armoured personnel carrier were concurrently in development and shared some components.

The Type 75 resembled the M109 self-propelled howitzer in layout. The driver's compartment was positioned at the front right of the vehicle, while the engine occupied the front left. The fighting compartment with a turret was at the rear. A crew of six operated the vehicle with, with all members except the driver stationed in the rear.

Both the hull and the turret were protected by heat-treated 7039 aluminium alloy armour, which gave the Type 75 bullet and artillery shell fragment resistance. Unlike the Type 74 105 mm self-propelled howitzer, the Type 75 was not amphibious. It was equipped with a NBC protection system.

Due to being heavier than the Type 73 armoured personnel carrier and the Type 74 self-propelled howitzer, the Type 75 was equipped with a more powerful engine. Mitsubishi 6ZF21WT was a two-stroke V6 turbocharged diesel engine that developed 450 hp at 2,200 rpm. An uncommon feature of the tracks was the lack of return rollers, which reduced the height of the tracks at the expense of increased risk of throwing a track. It had torsion bar suspension.

The Type 75's 155 mm L/30 howitzer gun was located in the rear-mounted hydraulically powered turret with 360-degree traverse. Shells were loaded automatically from two nine-round drum magazines, while loaders attached fuzes and loaded propelling charges. Up to 28 howitzer rounds of various types could be stored in the vehicle. A 12.7 mm M2HB machine gun with a gun shield was mounted on top of the turret. Up to 1,000 rounds of ammunition were available for the machine gun.

== Operational history ==
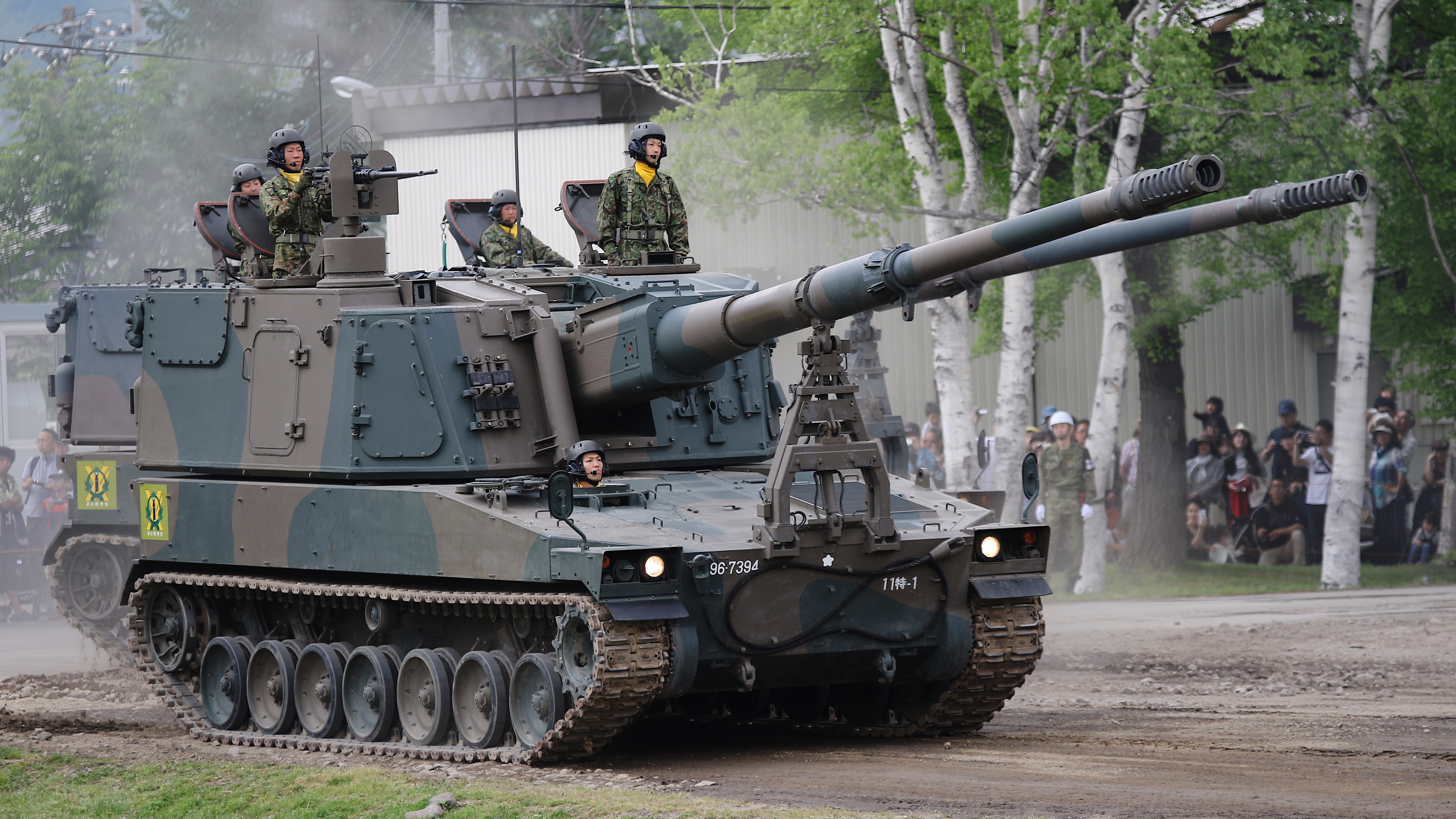
The Type 99 155 mm self-propelled howitzer has a longer-range 155 mm 52-caliber howitzer gun.

Procurement of Type 75s began in 1977 and ended in 1985. A total of 201 units were procured over the production run. Most were deployed to the Japan Ground Self-Defense Force's Northern Army units based in Hokkaido.

As of 2001, Japan reported to the United Nations Office for Disarmament Affairs that 201 Type 75s were in service. Starting in 1999, it was gradually replaced by the Type 99 155 mm self-propelled howitzer. As of December 2008, it still equipped the 5th, 11th, 171st and 172nd Field Artillery Battalions.

Despite having performance comparable to foreign equivalents at its inception, by the early 2000s the Type 75 was outdated. Last vehicles served into the mid-2010s and were superseded by Type 99s in March 2014.

== Gallery ==
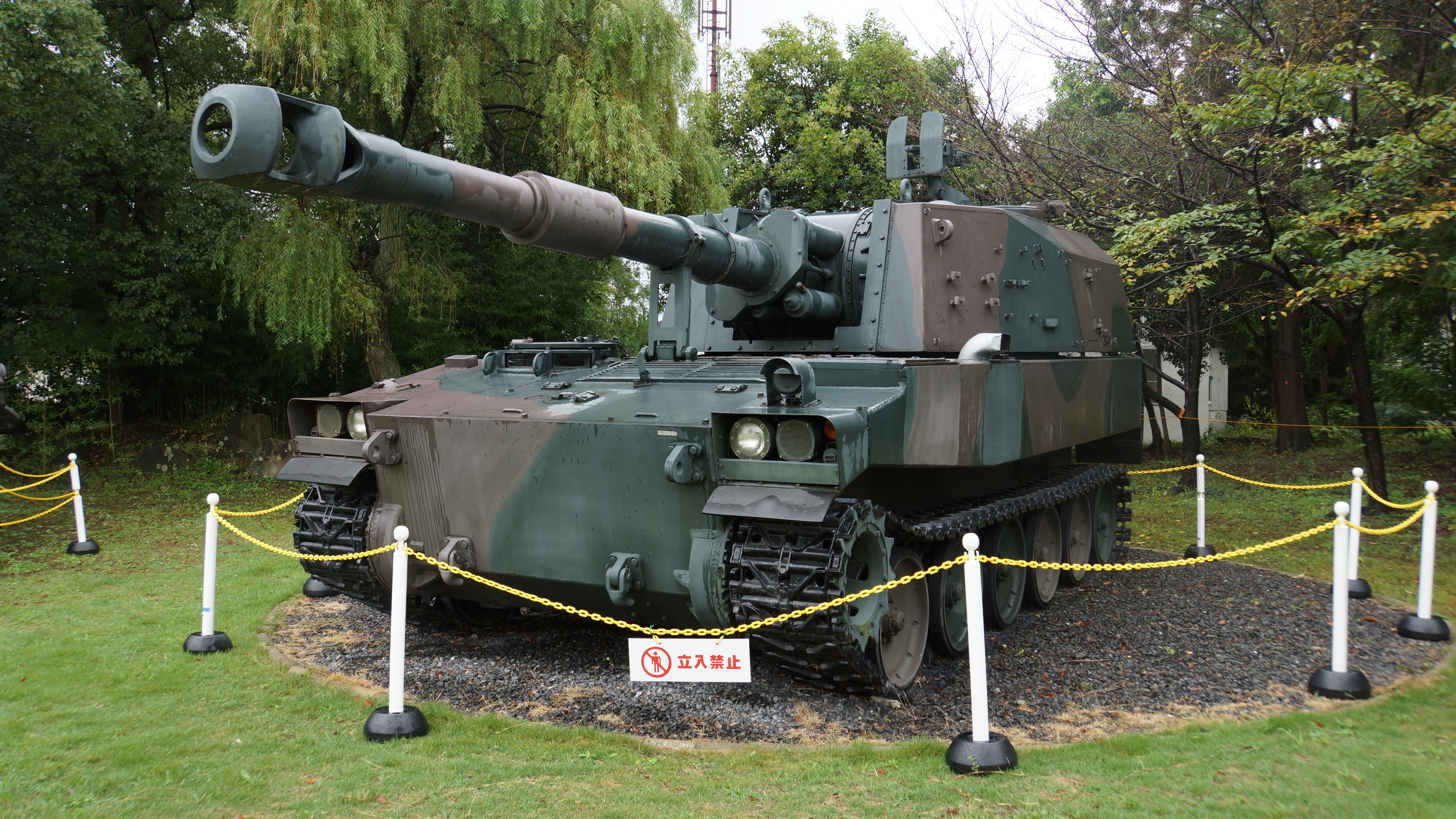
Left front view of the Type 75

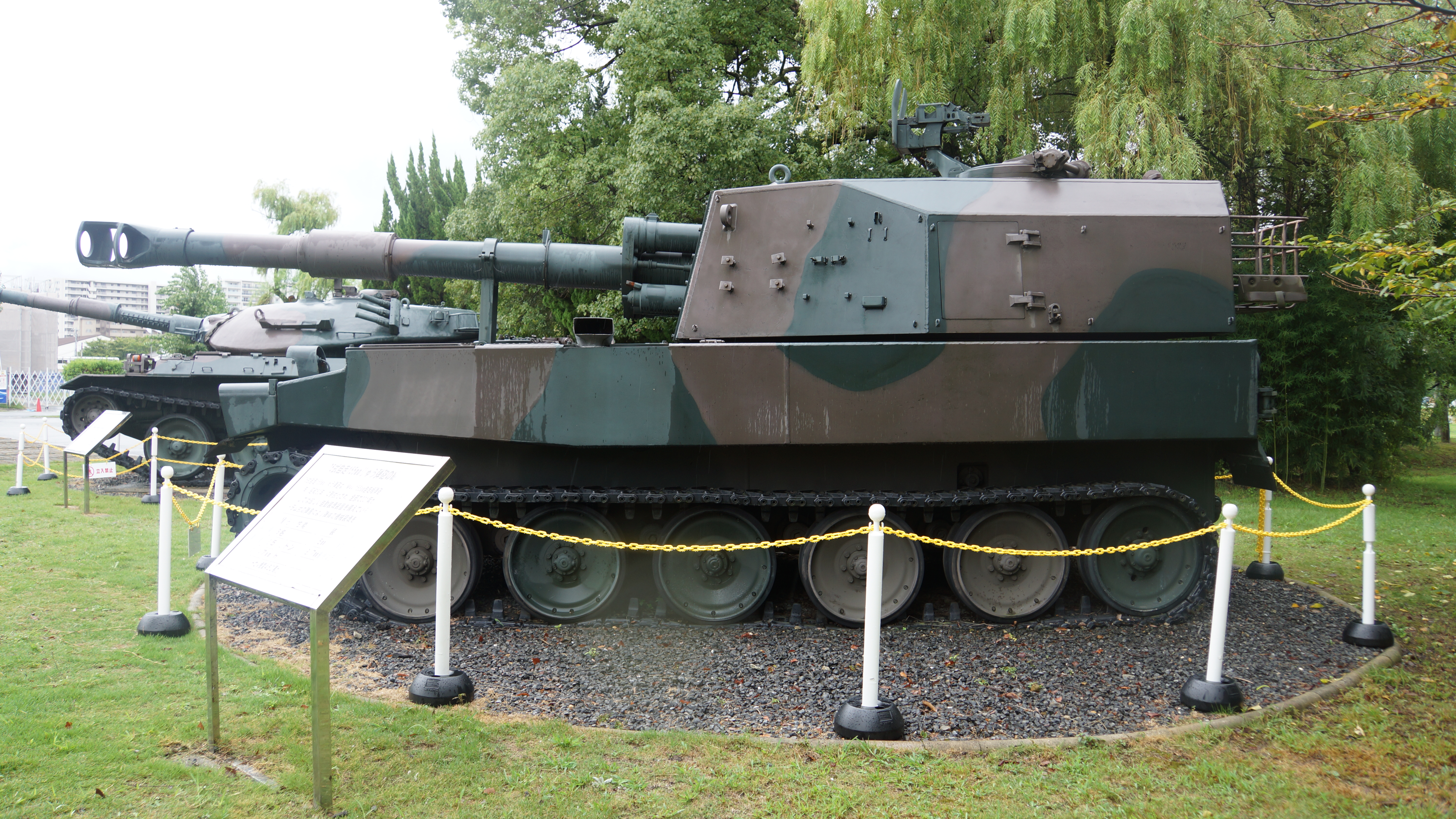
Left side view of the Type 75

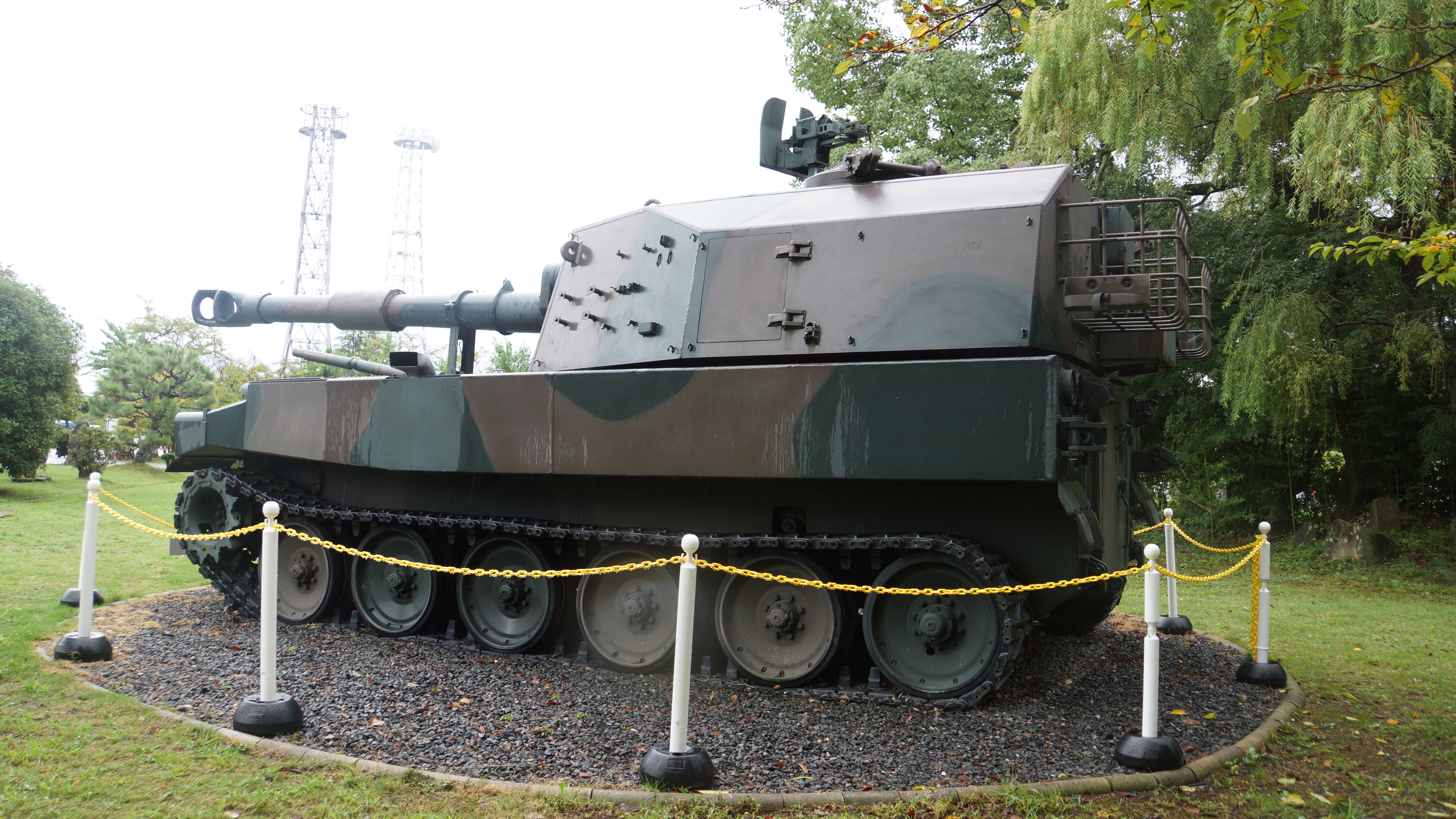
Left rear view of the Type 75

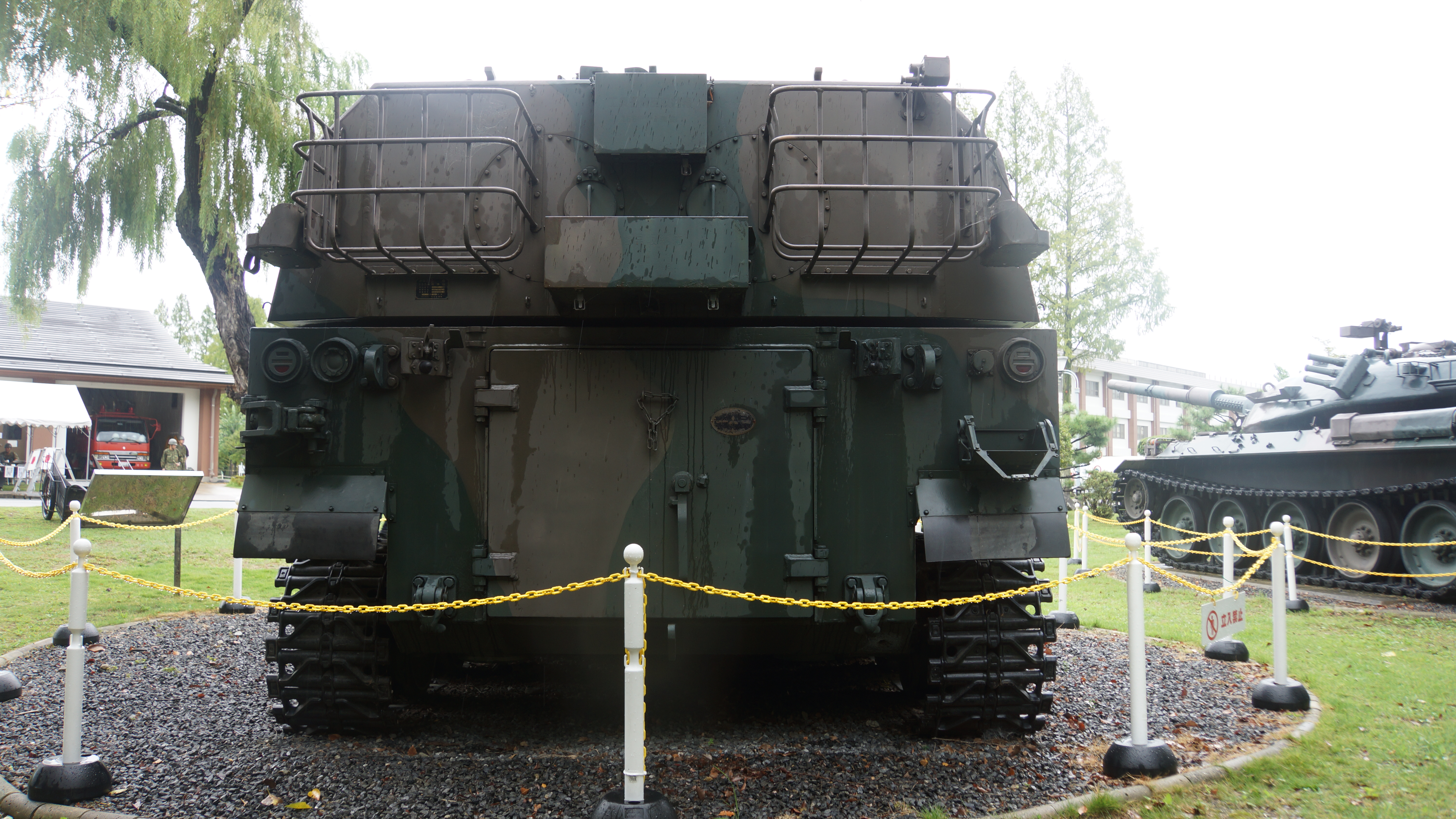
Rear view of the Type 75

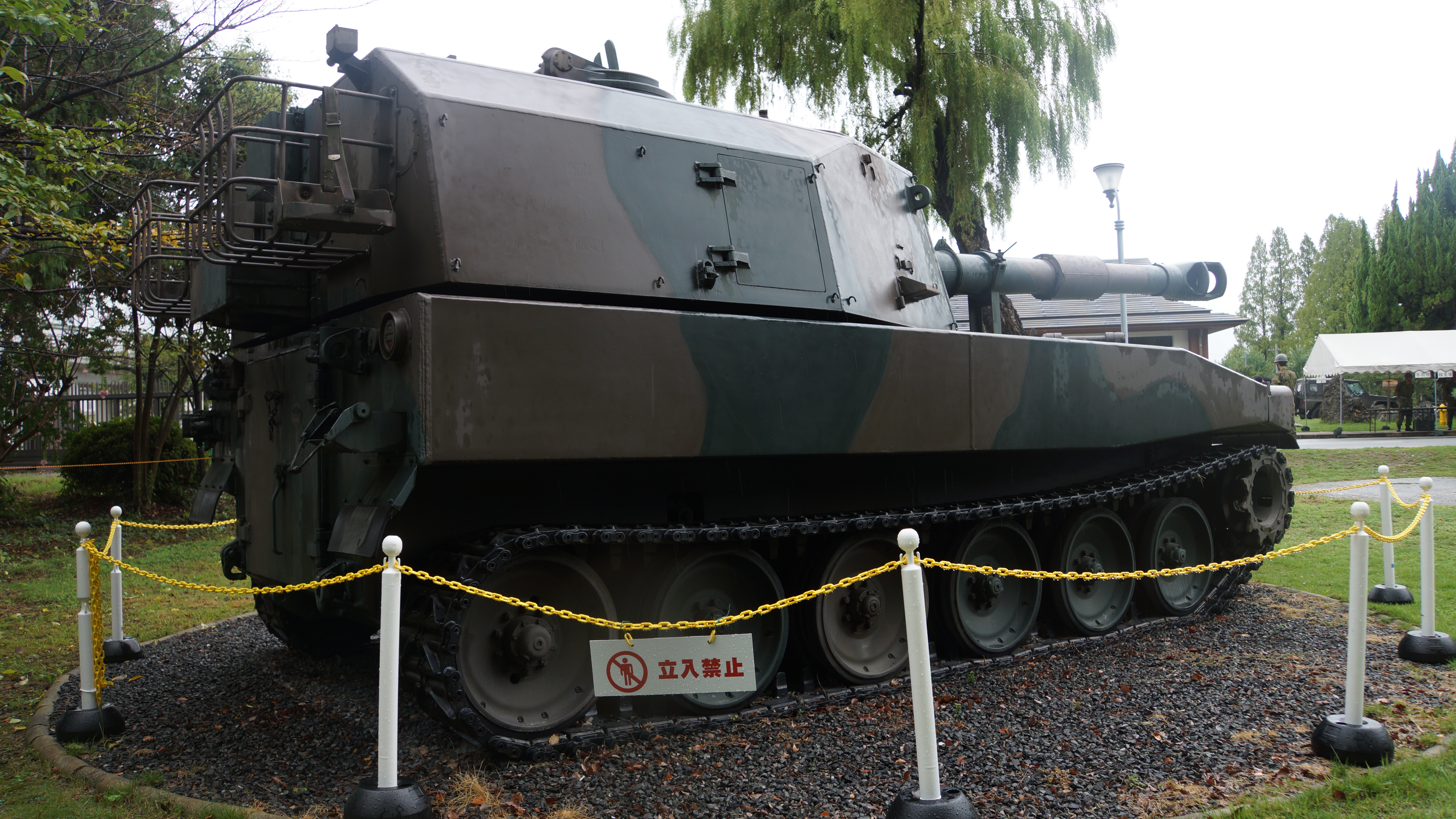
Right rear view of the Type 75

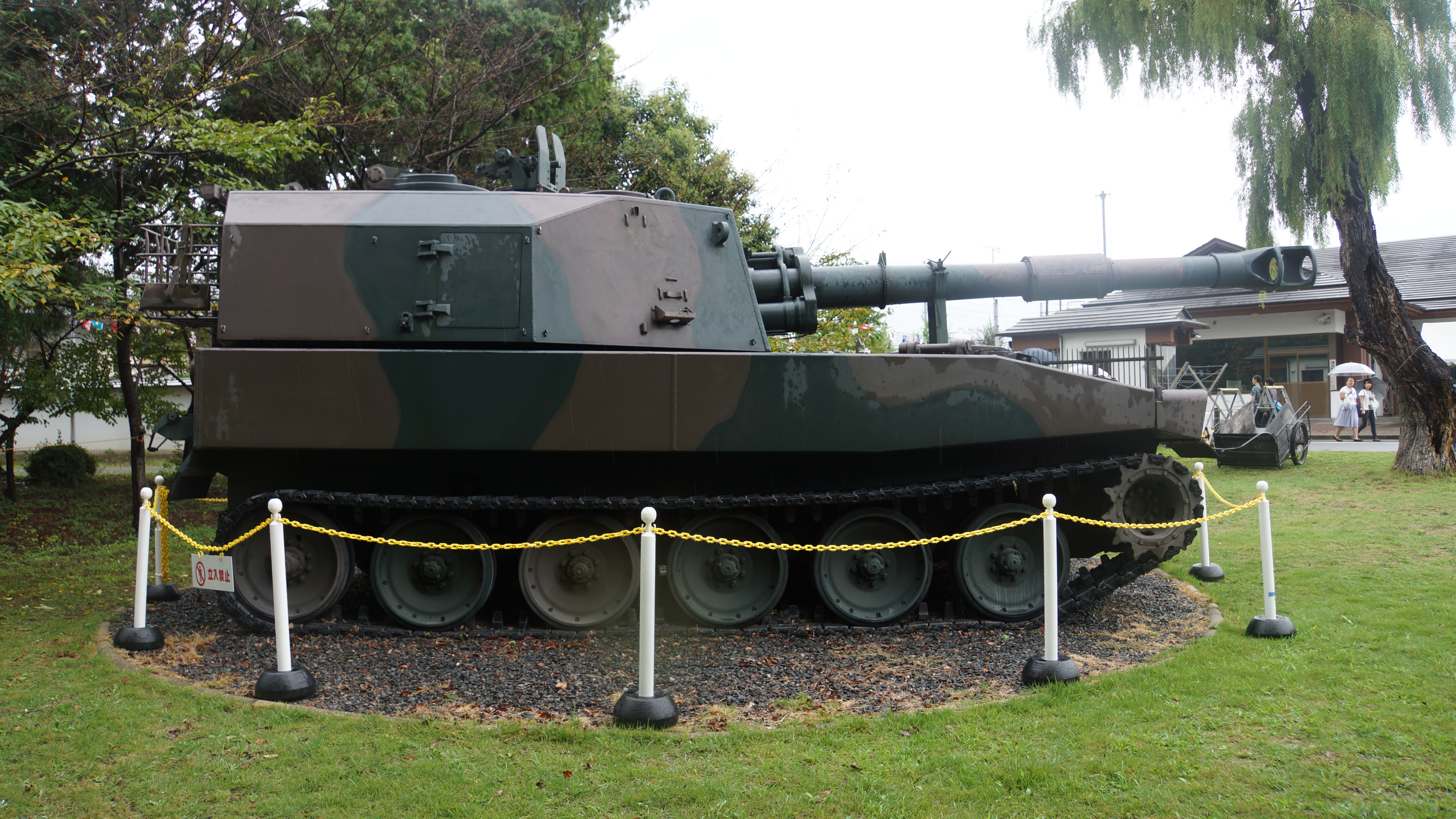
Right side view of the Type 75

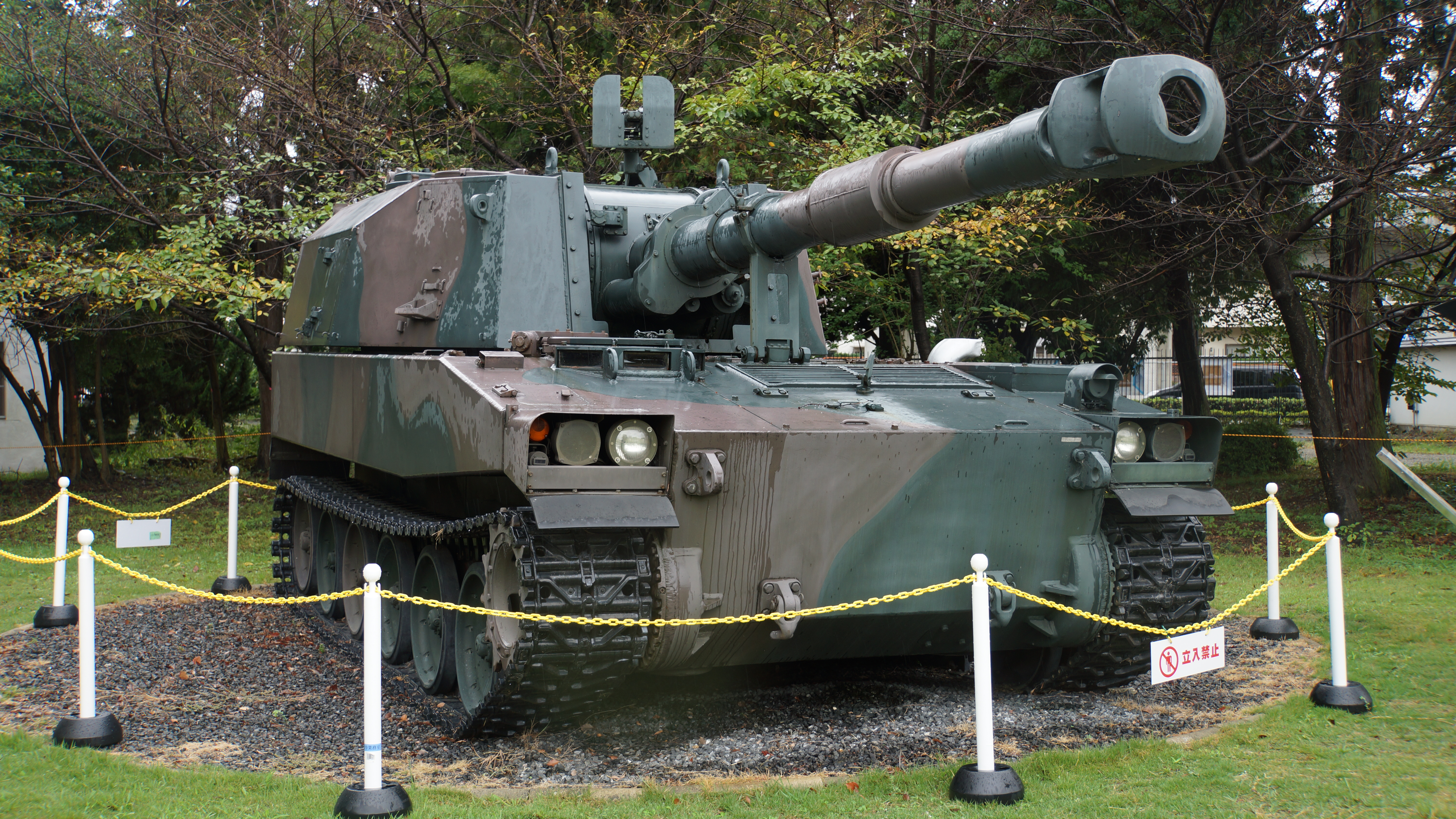
Front right view of the Type 75

== Similar vehicles ==
- 15,5 cm bandkanon 1 – (Sweden)
- 152 mm SpGH DANA – (Czechoslovakia)
- 2S3 Akatsiya – (Soviet Union)
- 2S5 Giatsint-S – (Soviet Union, Russia)
- AMX-30 AuF1 – (France)
- M109 howitzer – (United States)
- Palmaria – (Italy)
- Type 83 – (China)

== See also ==
- List of self-propelled howitzers
