= Type 74 105 mm self-propelled howitzer =

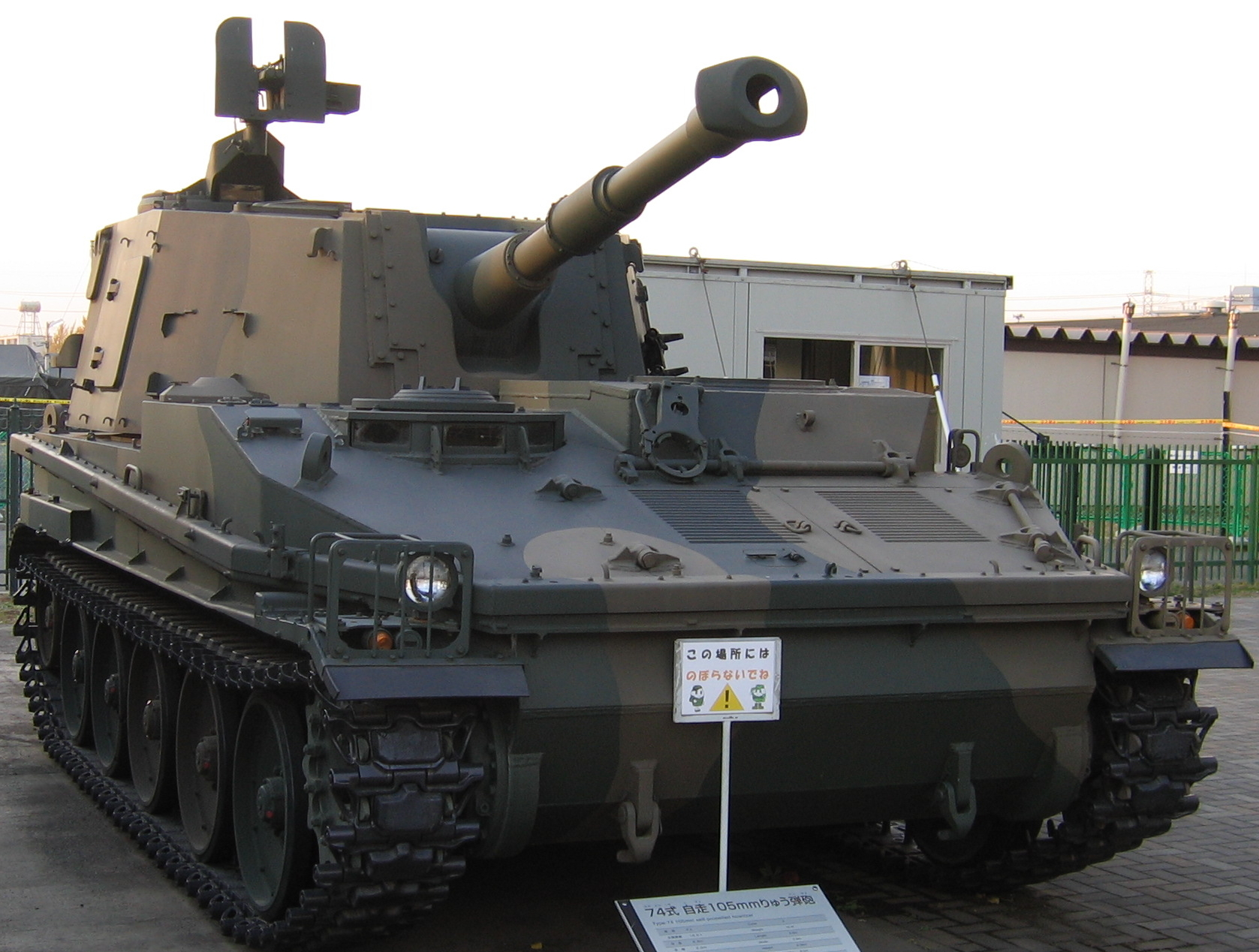
- Type 74 displayed at the JGSDF Public Information Museum
- Type: Self-propelled howitzer
- Place of origin: Japan

Service history
- In service: 1975–1999
- Used by: Japan

Production history
- Designed: 1969–1974
- Produced: 1975–1978
- No. built: 20

Specifications
- Mass: 16,500 kg (16.2 long tons; 18.2 short tons)
- Length: 5.78 m (20 ft)
- Width: 2.87 m (9 ft 5 in)
- Height: 2.39 m (7 ft 10 in)
- Crew: 4
- Shell: separate-loading
- Caliber: 105 mm (4.1 in)
- Traverse: 360°
- Rate of fire: 10 rpm
- Muzzle velocity: 645 m/s (2,120 ft/s)
- Maximum firing range: 14.5 km (9 mi)
- Sights: direct- and indirect-fire
- Armor: aluminium
- Main armament: 105 mm howitzer
- Secondary armament: 12.7 mm M2HB machine gun
- Engine: Mitsubishi 4ZF V-type 4-cylinder diesel 300 bhp (220 kW)
- Power/weight: 18.4 hp/t (13.7 kW/t)
- Transmission: manual
- Suspension: torsion bar
- Ground clearance: 0.4 m (16 in)
- Fuel capacity: 410 L (110 US gal)
- Operational range: 300 km (190 mi)
- Maximum speed: 50 km/h (31 mph) on road 6 km/h (3.7 mph) in water

The Type 74 105 mm self-propelled howitzer was developed in Japan and only served there. It shared a number of automotive components with the Type 73 armored personnel carrier, which was developed at the same time. Komatsu developed the chassis, while the howitzer gun and turret were designed by the Japan Steel Works. The first prototypes were completed in 1969–1970, and the howitzer was accepted into service in 1974.

== Design ==
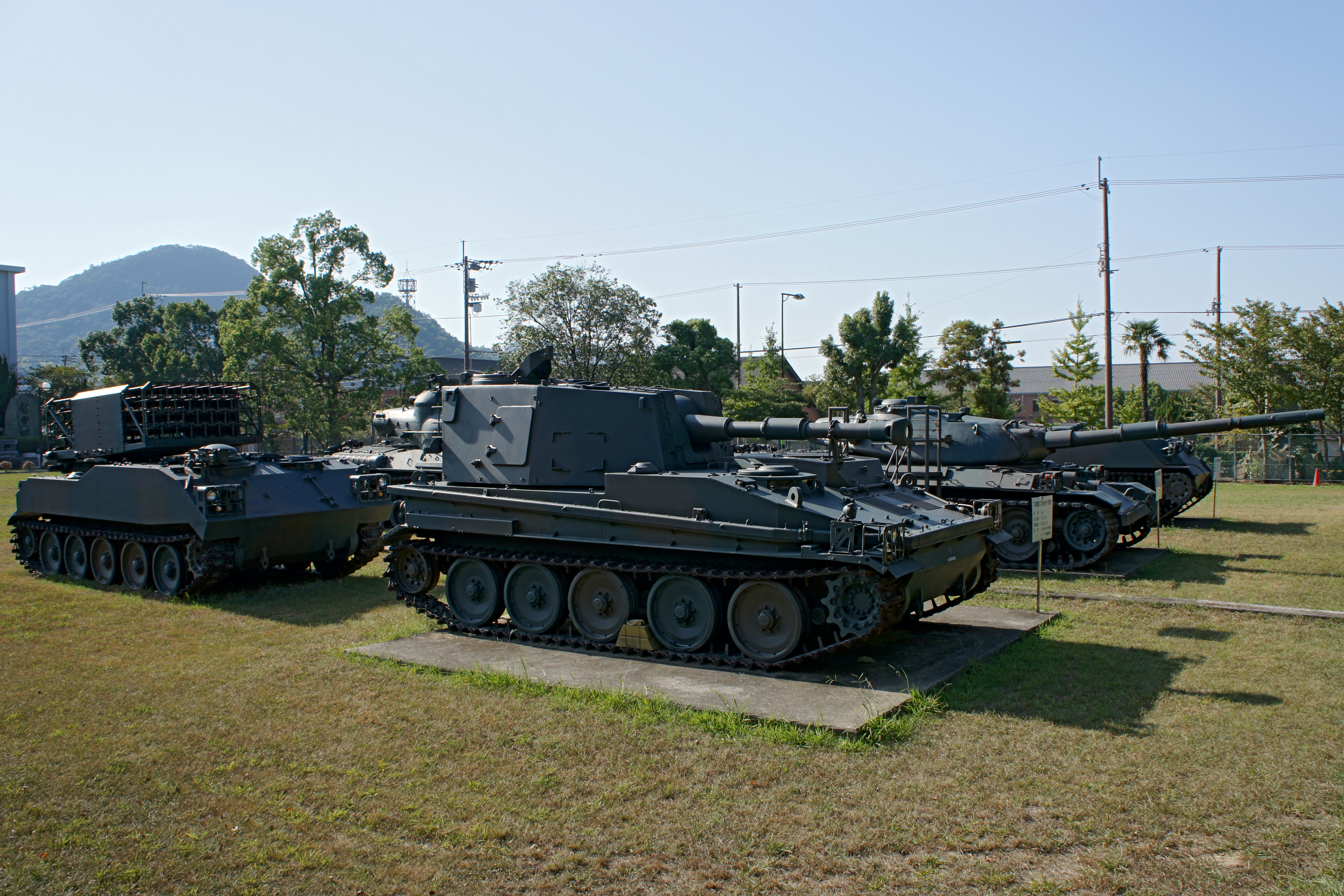
The Type 75 130 mm multiple rocket launcher (left) and the Type 74 105 mm self-propelled howitzer (right) use components from the Type 73 armored personnel carrier.

The Type 74 had a conventional self-propelled howitzer layout with a rear-mounted turret that could traverse 360°. The engine was located in the front left section of the vehicle next to the driver on the right. The rest of the crew stations were in the rear of the chassis and in the turret. While the standard crew size was four, there was an additional seat for a fifth crew member.

The Type 74 shared automotive components with the contemporary Type 73 armoured personnel carrier, notably its engine and transmission. Since Komatsu designed and produced the chassis, it shared more similarities with the Type 73 SUB 2 prototype than the SUB 1 developed by Mitsubishi Heavy Industries. Unlike many other examples of self-propelled artillery, the Type 74 was amphibious when using the erectable flotation screen stowed around the periphery of the upper hull.

The turret of the Type 74 housed the 105 mm L/30 howitzer developed by Japan Steel Works. On top of the turret was a 12.7 mm M2HB machine gun equipped with a gun shield. Four crew members could stow their 7.62 mm Type 64 personal weapons in the vehicle. The controls of the NBC filtration system were also placed in the turret.

The Type 74 carried 43 rounds of different types of 105 mm ammunition on board. Among the available semi-fixed ammunition types were high explosive (M1), high-explosive anti-tank (M67), illumination (M314), smoke (M60 WP and M84 HC), and training shells (M1 and Type 69). A long-range Type 74 shell was developed specifically for the vehicle.

== Operational history ==
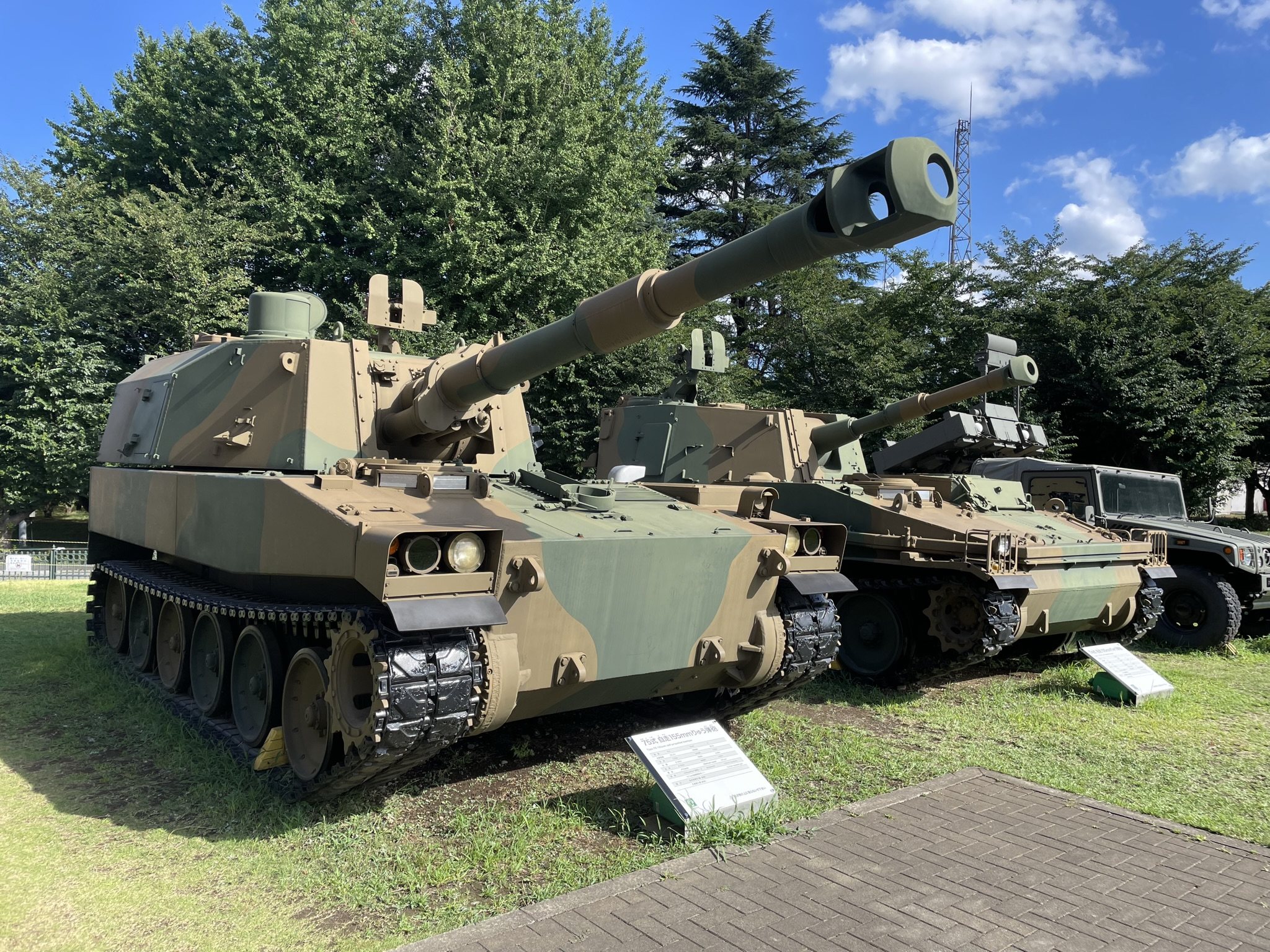
The Type 75 155 mm self-propelled howitzer (left) superseded the Type 74 105 mm self-propelled howitzer (right) in service.

The Type 74 was standardised in 1974 and the howitzer began entering service in 1975. Series production began in 1975 with five vehicles produced per year and concluded in 1978 with 20 self-propelled howitzers produced. Adoption of the Type 74 remained limited, arguably due to the increasing availability of the more effective Type 75 155 mm self-propelled howitzer, the inefficiency of the 105 mm howitzer platform, and the effort to standardise on the 155 mm shell to simplify ammunition logistics.

All 20 produced Type 74 howitzers were attached to the 117th Artillery Battalion in Hokkaido. The self-propelled howitzers replaced towed 155 mm M1 howitzers in service. In 1999, all Type 74s were retired without replacement and the battalion was disbanded.

== Gallery ==
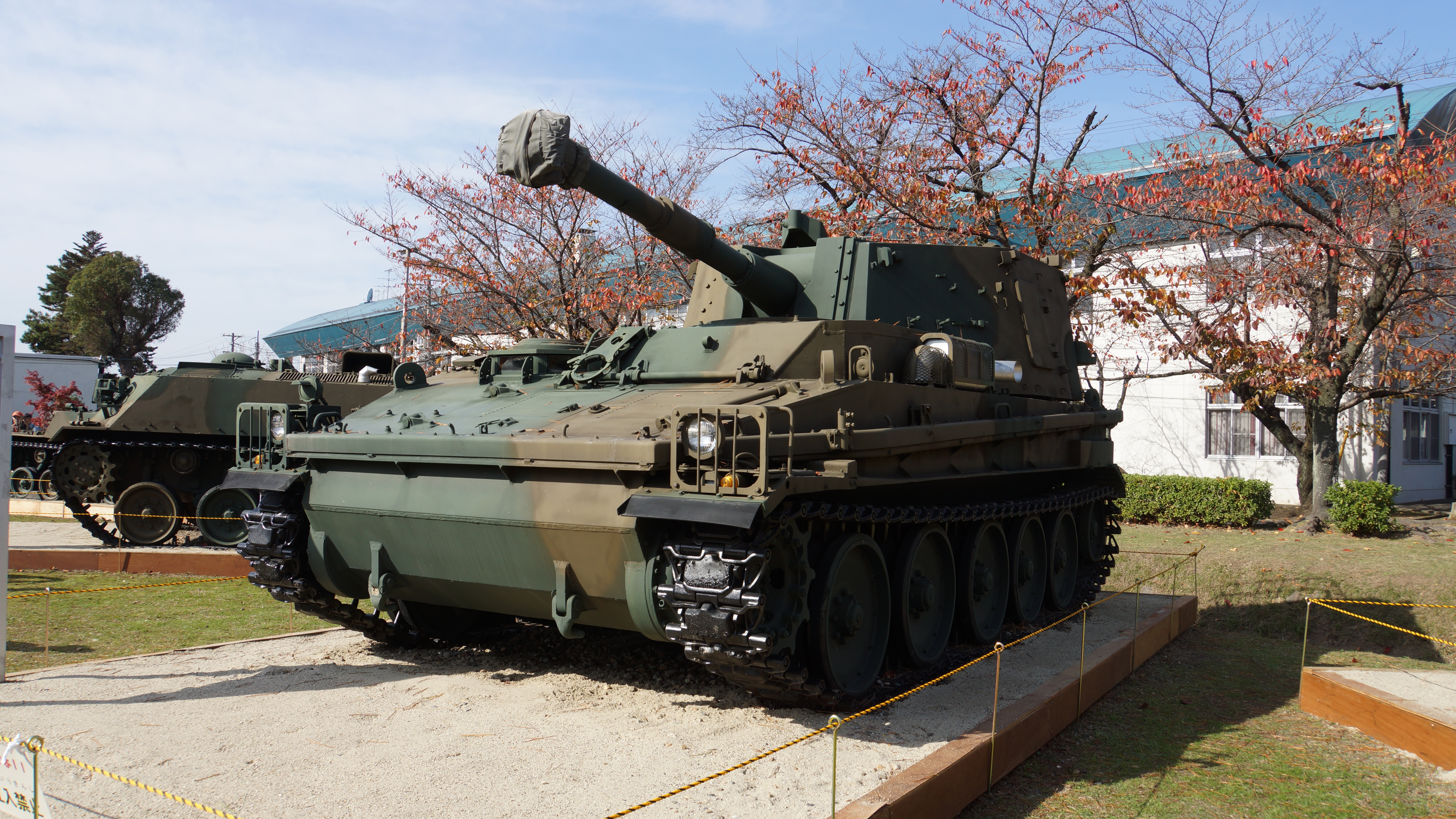
Left front view of the Type 74.

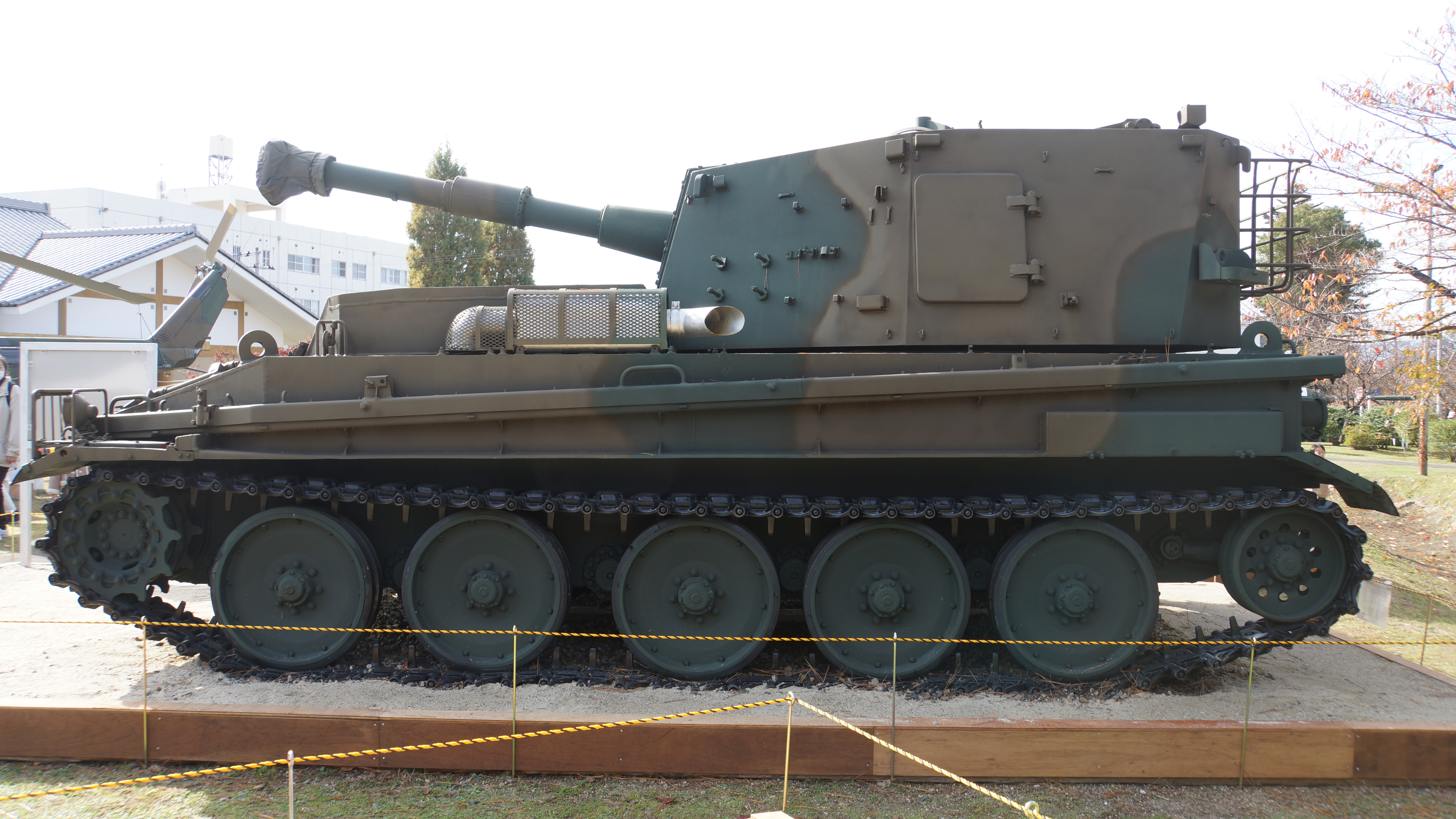
Left view of the Type 74.

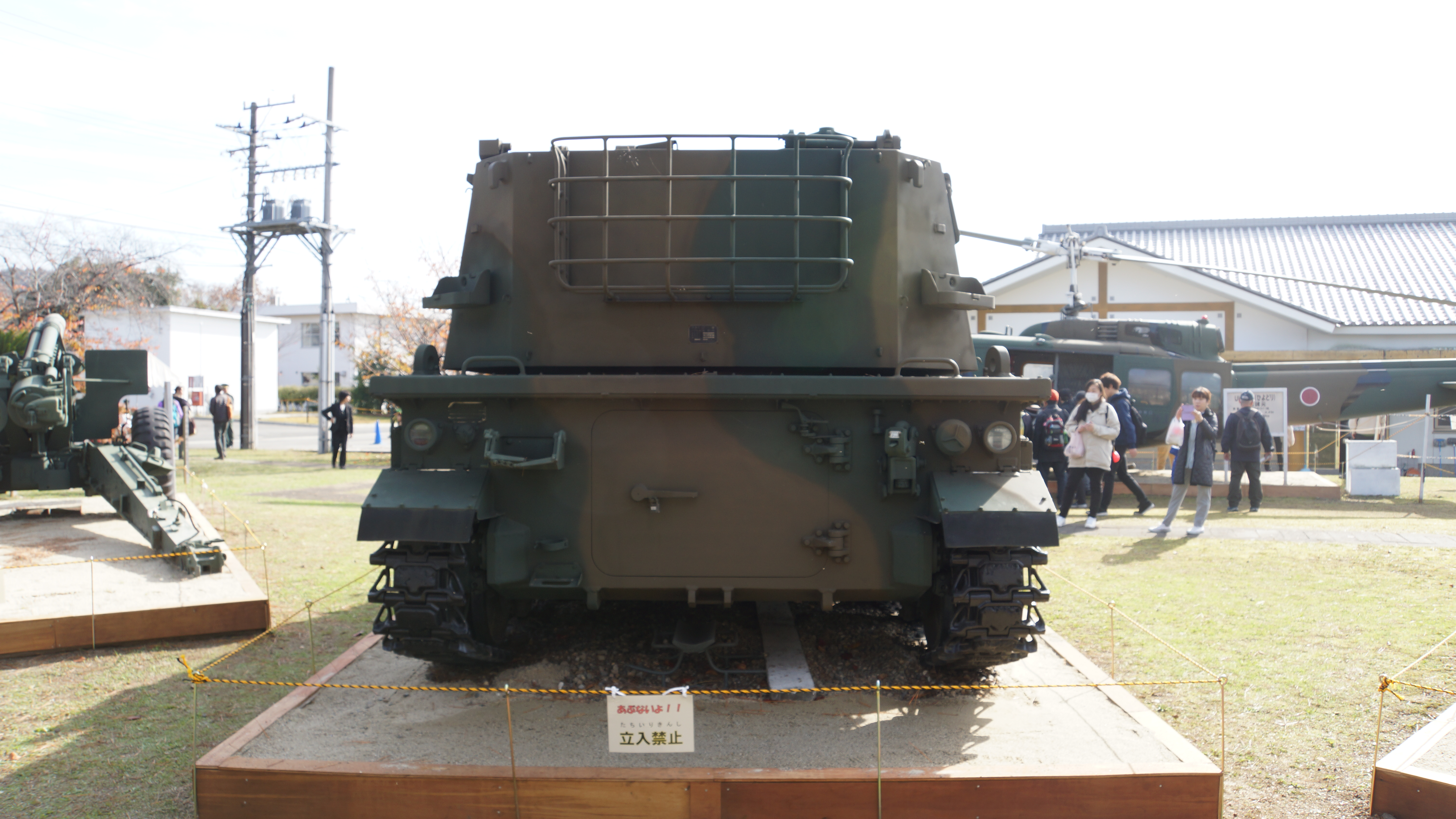
Rear view of the Type 74.

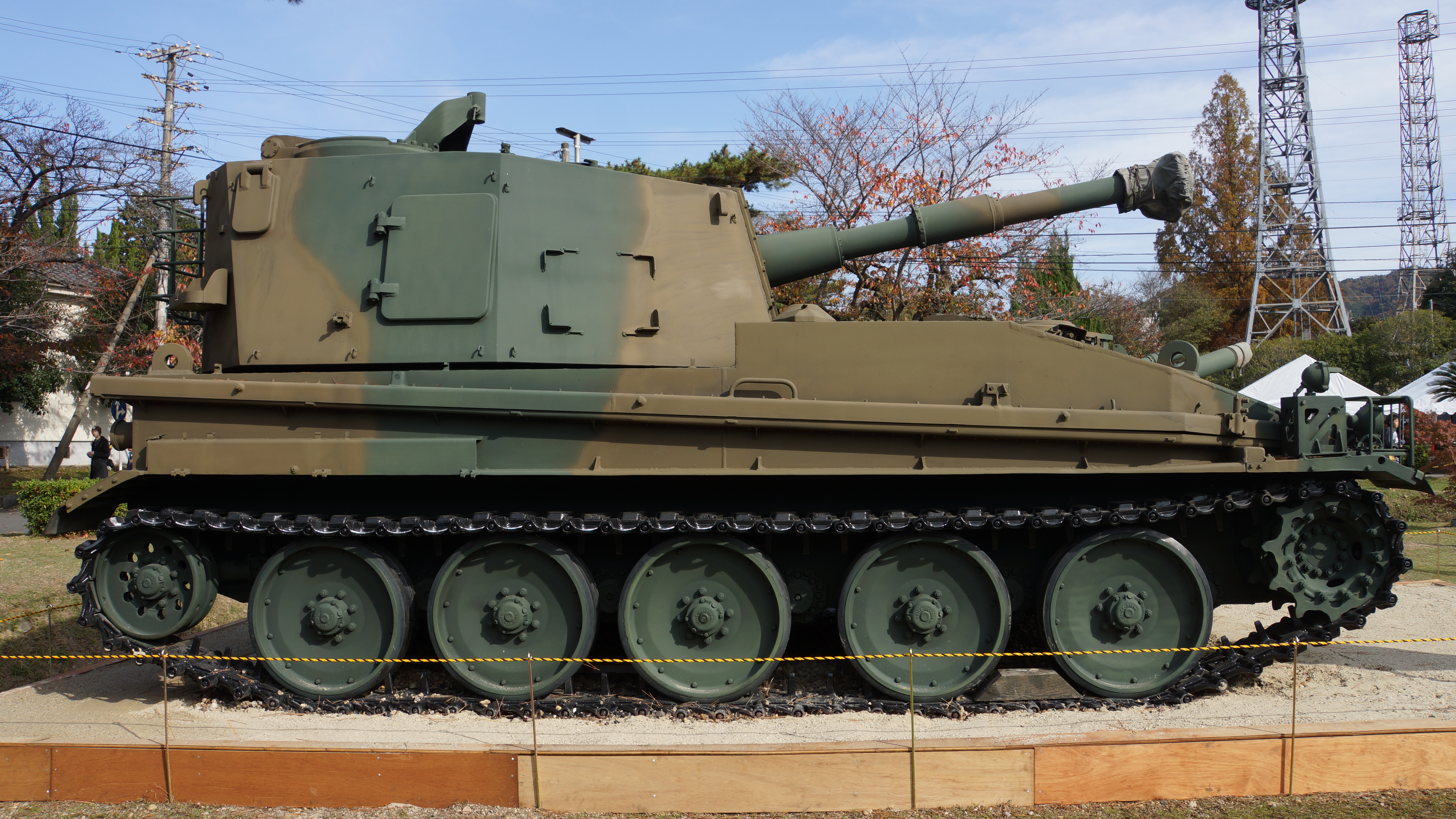
Right side view of the Type 74.

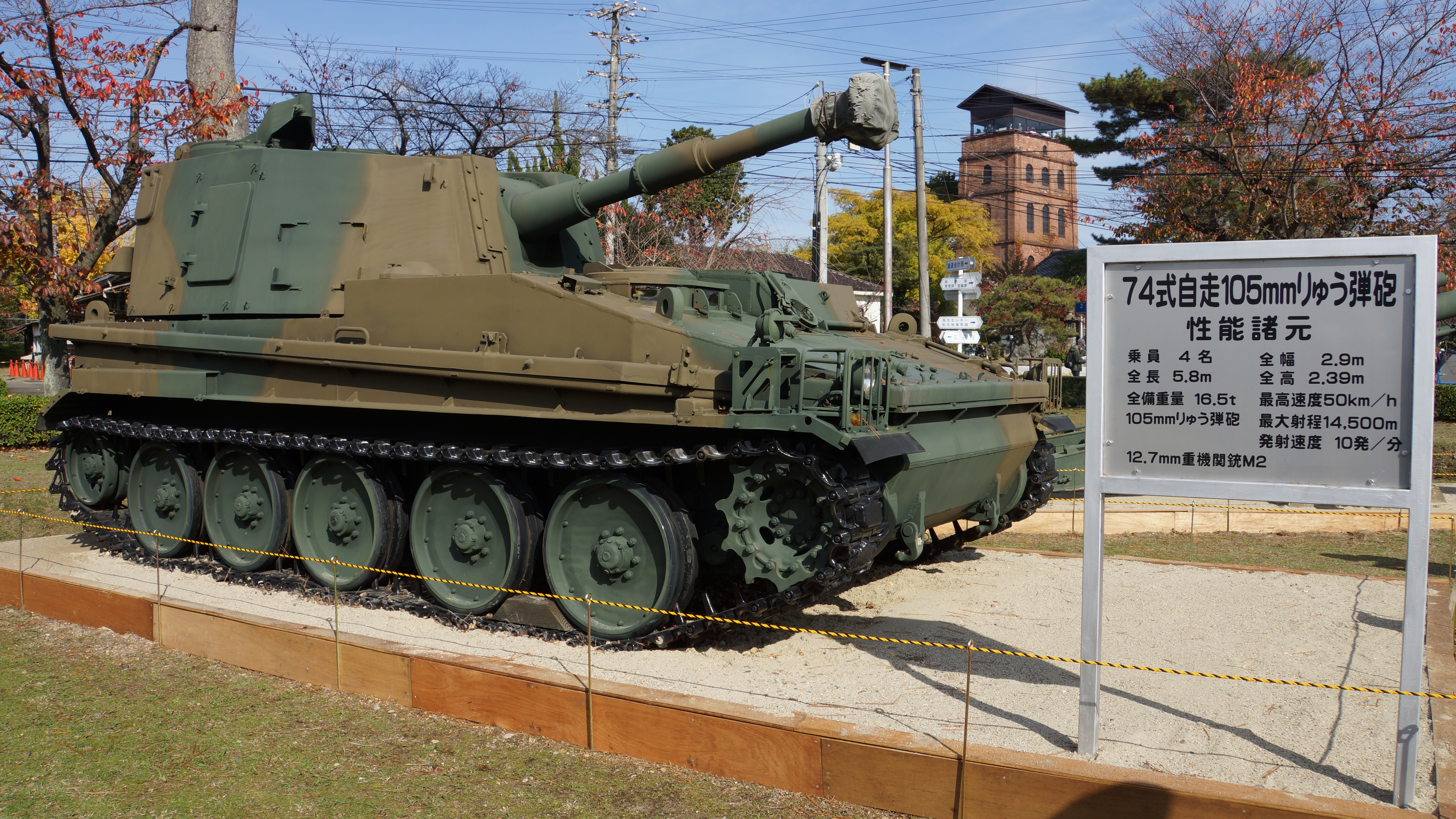
Right front view of the Type 74.

== Contemporary equivalents ==
- FV433 Abbot – (United Kingdom)
- M108 howitzer – (United States)
- Mk 61 105 mm self-propelled howitzer – (France)

== See also ==
- List of self-propelled howitzers
