= 75th Expeditionary Air Support Operations Squadron =

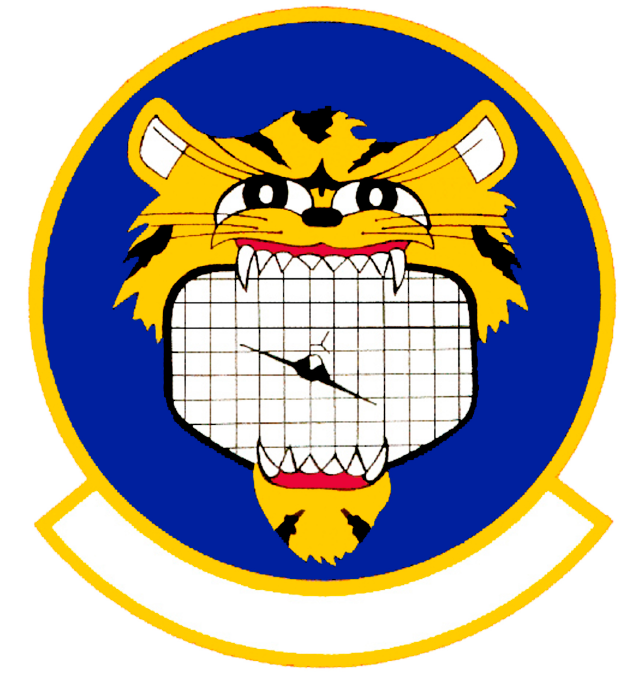
- 75th Expeditionary Air Support Operations Squadron emblem
- Active: 1972–1983; 2009–present
- Country: United States
- Branch: United States Air Force
- Type: Combat Support
- Role: Air Support Operations
- Decorations: AFOUA

The United States Air Force's 75th Expeditionary Air Support Operations Squadron (75 EASOS) is a combat support unit providing Tactical Command and Control of air power assets to the Joint Forces Air Component Commander and Joint Forces Land Component Commander for combat operations.

== Previous designations ==
- 75th Expeditionary Air Support Operations Squadron (12 Feb 2009 – present)
- 75th Tactical Control Flight (1 Feb 1972 – 1 Jul 1983)

== Assignments ==
=== Major Command ===
- Air Combat Command (12 Feb 2009 – present)
- Tactical Air Command (1 Feb 1972 – 1 Jul 1983)

=== Wings/Groups ===
- 507th Tactical Control Wing (1 Feb 1972 – 1 Jul 1983)

== Bases stationed ==
- Eglin AFB Aux Fld # 3, Florida (1 Feb 1972 – 1 Jul 1983)

== Decorations ==
- Air Force Outstanding Unit Award
  - 1 May 1981 – 30 Apr 1983
  - 16 Jun 1975 – 31 May 1977
  - 16 Jun 1974 – 15 Jun 1975
