= 75th Division (People's Republic of China) =

75th Division (1949–52)
- Active: 1949.2 - 1952.7
- Country: People's Republic of China
- Branch: People's Liberation Army
- Type: Division
- Role: Infantry
- Part of: 25th Corps
- Engagements: Chinese Civil War

The 75th Division (Chinese: 第75师 was created in February 1949 under the Regulation of the Redesignations of All Organizations and Units of the Army, issued by Central Military Commission on November 1, 1948, basing on the 21st Division, 7th Column of the PLA Huadong Field Army. Its history can be traced to the later's formation in March 1947.

The division is part of 25th Corps. Under the flag of 75th division it took part in the Chinese Civil War. In July 1952 the division was disbanded along with the corps HQ. The division HQ was transferred to the Air Force, while its regiments were transferred as follows:

- 223rd Regiment was transferred to 74th Division and renamed as 221st Regiment.
- 224th Regiment and 225th Regiment became independent cadre regiments of Jiangsu Military District. In July 1954 224th Regiment was transferred to Fujian Military District, and 225th Regiment became Artillery Regiment, 35th Division.
