= 75 Squadron =

75 Squadron or 75th Squadron may refer to:

- No. 75 Squadron RAAF
- No. 75 Squadron RNZAF
- No. 75 Squadron RAF

United States:

- 75th Aero Squadron
- 75th Bombardment Squadron
- 75th Expeditionary Airlift Squadron
- 75th Expeditionary Air Support Operations Squadron
- 75th Fighter Squadron
- 75th Troop Carrier Squadron
