= 75th Street =

75th Street may refer to:

== In New York City ==
- 75th Street (Manhattan)
- 75th Street – Elderts Lane (BMT Jamaica Line)

== Elsewhere ==
- 75th Street (Grand Crossing) station, Chicago
- 75 Street, Edmonton, Alberta, Canada
