= 75th Infantry Division (South Korea) =

- Active: 1 July 1983 - present
- Country: South Korea
- Branch: Republic of Korea Reserve Forces
- Type: Infantry
- Role: Reserve forces
- Size: Division
- Part of: Mobilization Force Command
- Garrison/HQ: Namyangju, Gyeonggi
- Nickname(s): "Iron Horse"

Commanders
- Current commander: Brig. Gen. Kim Seop

The 75th Reserve Infantry Division (Korean: 제75동원보병사단) is a military formation of the Republic of Korea Reserve Forces (ROKA). The division is subordinated to the Mobilization Force Command and is headquartered in Namyangju City, Gyeonggi Province. During the peacetime, they are in charge of recruit training and active as a second line military unit.

The division was created on 1 July 1983.

== Organization ==
- Headquarters:
  - Headquarters Battalion
  - Reconnaissance Battalion
  - Engineer Battalion
  - Armor Battalion (M48A5K)
  - Chemical Company
  - Signal Battalion
  - Support Battalion
  - Medical Battalion
- 207th Infantry Brigade
- 208th Infantry Brigade
- 209th Infantry Brigade
- Artillery Brigade
  - 3 Artillery Battalions (equipped with M101 howitzer)
  - Artillery Battalion (equipped with M114 howitzer)

== See also ==
- Korean Demilitarized Zone
