= 75th Regiment of Foot (1745) =

75th Regiment of Foot Viscount Falmouth's Cornish Regiment of Foot
- Active: 1745–1746
- Country: Kingdom of Great Britain
- Branch: British Army
- Type: Infantry
- Garrison/HQ: Truro
- Engagements: Jacobite rising of 1745

Commanders
- Colonel of the Regiment: Hugh Boscawen, 2nd Viscount Falmouth

The 75th Regiment of Foot, or Falmouth's Cornish Regiment of Foot, was a regiment in the British Army from 1745 to 1746.

== History ==
In response to the Jacobite rising of 1745, the regiment was raised at Truro by Hugh Boscawen, 2nd Viscount Falmouth. The new regiment, also known as "Viscount Falmouth's Cornish Regiment of Foot", received the rank 75th.

The 75th Foot was declared "half-complete" on November 2 and soon considered "ready to march". However, it never left Cornwall. As of 30 January 1746, it mustered 779 NCOs and privates for an authorized strength of 780.

The regiment was ordered to be disbanded on 10 June 1745 and the process was probably completed by the end of the month.

== Uniform ==
Most of the regiment raised by noblemen in 1745 had blue coats and red facings, but the following uniform has been conjectured for Falmouth's Regiment: red coats with white facings and the front of the grenadier cap "may have bore the family device of a falcon".
