= AD 75 =

AD 75 in various calendars
- Gregorian calendar: AD 75; LXXV
- Ab urbe condita: 828
- Assyrian calendar: 4825
- Balinese saka calendar: N/A
- Bengali calendar: −519 – −518
- Berber calendar: 1025
- Buddhist calendar: 619
- Burmese calendar: −563
- Byzantine calendar: 5583–5584
- Chinese calendar: 甲戌年 (Wood Dog); 2772 or 2565 — to — 乙亥年 (Wood Pig); 2773 or 2566
- Coptic calendar: −209 – −208
- Discordian calendar: 1241
- Ethiopian calendar: 67–68
- Hebrew calendar: 3835–3836
- Hindu calendars
- Vikram Samvat: 131–132
- Shaka Samvat: N/A
- Kali Yuga: 3175–3176
- Holocene calendar: 10075
- Iranian calendar: 547 BP – 546 BP
- Islamic calendar: 564 BH – 563 BH
- Javanese calendar: N/A
- Julian calendar: AD 75; LXXV
- Korean calendar: 2408
- Minguo calendar: 1837 before ROC 民前1837年
- Nanakshahi calendar: −1393
- Seleucid era: 386/387 AG
- Thai solar calendar: 617–618
- Tibetan calendar: ཤིང་ཕོ་ཁྱི་ལོ་ (male Wood-Dog); 201 or −180 or −952 — to — ཤིང་མོ་ཕག་ལོ་ (female Wood-Boar); 202 or −179 or −951

AD 75 (LXXV) was a common year starting on Sunday of the Julian calendar. At the time, it was known as the Year of the Consulship of Augustus and Vespasianus (or, less frequently, year 828 Ab urbe condita). The denomination AD 75 for this year has been used since the early medieval period, when the Anno Domini calendar era became the prevalent method in Europe for naming years.

== Events ==
=== By place ===
==== Roman Empire ====
- Emperor Vespasian and his son Titus Caesar Vespasianus become Roman Consuls.
- The Temple of Peace, also known as the Forum of Vespasian, is built in Rome. The temple celebrates the conquest of Jerusalem (in AD 70) and houses the Menorah from Herod's Temple.
- Vespasian fortifies Armazi (Georgia) for the Iberian king Mithridates I. The Alans raid the Roman frontier in Armenia.
- Sextus Julius Frontinus becomes governor of Britannia and makes his headquarters in Isca Augusta (Wales).
- Frontinus begins his conquest of Wales; Legio II Augusta is moved to the border of the River Usk.

==== Asia ====
- Accession of Han Zhangdi of the Han dynasty (until AD 88).
- Revolt against the Chinese in Tarim: Cachera and Turpan are besieged. Luoyang orders the evacuation of Tarim. Ban Chao makes the rebels retreat towards Khotan. At the same time, the Chinese army of Ganzhou reconquers Turpan in Northern Xiongnu. Ban Chao convinces the emperor of the need to control Central Asia in the fight against Xiongnu.

== Births ==
- Suetonius, Roman historian (approximate date) (d. c. 122)
- Gaius Julius Alexander Berenicianus, Cilician prince (d. 150)

== Deaths ==
- Chen Mu, Chinese governor and general
- Guo Xun, Chinese general
- Han Mingdi, Chinese emperor of the Han dynasty (b. AD 28)
