= M75 =

M75 or M-75 may refer to:

== Military ==
- M75 (APC), a United States armored personnel carrier
- M75 grenade launcher, a United States automatic grenade launcher
- M75 hand grenade, a Yugoslavian hand grenade
- M74/M75 mortar, a mortar developed in the former Yugoslavia
- M-75 rocket, locally made rockets used in Palestinian rocket attacks on Israel

== Places ==
- Messier 75, a globular cluster in the constellation Sagittarius
- M-75 (Michigan highway), a Michigan state highway

== Other uses ==
- Miles M.75 Aries, a Miles Gemini aircraft variant
- Siemens M75, a shock-proof, weatherproof phone
- SIG P220, a pistol also known as M75
- M 75, an age group for Masters athletics (athletes aged 35+)
- Sako 75, a Finnish bolt-action rifle also known as M75

== See also ==
- Model 1875 (disambiguation) -- M-1875
- M1975 (disambiguation)
- 75 (disambiguation)
