= Class 75 =

Class 75 may refer to:

- DRG Class 75, a class of German 2-6-2T passenger tank locomotive operated by the Deutsche Reichsbahn comprising:
  - Class 75.0: Württemberg T 5
  - Class 75.1-3: Baden VI b
  - Class 75.4,10-11: Baden VI c
  - Class 75.5: Saxon XIV HT
  - Class 75.6: BLE Nos. 45 to 49, ELE Nos. 11 to 13, 14, MFWE Nos. 29 to 32 and other locomotives taken over by the Reichsbahn
  - Class 75.6: PH H, PH H'
  - Class 75.7: BBÖ 229, JDŽ 116
  - Class 75.8: BBÖ 29, JDŽ 116, PKP Class Okl11, PKP Class Okl12
  - Class 75.9: ČSD Class 355.0
  - Class 75.12-13: PKP Class Okl27
  - Class 75.14: JDŽ 17
  - Class 75.62: various locomotives taken over by the East German Deutsche Reichsbahn in 1949
  - Class 75.64: ditto
  - Class 75.66: ditto
  - Class 75.67: HBE Nos. 6 and 7, taken over by the East German Deutsche Reichsbahn in 1949
  - Class 75.561
