= C75 =

C75 may refer to:

- Boeing C-75, a 1942 military aircraft
- Ruy Lopez chess openings ECO code
- Malignant neoplasm of other endocrine glands and related structures ICD-10 code
- Continental C75, an engine
- Caldwell 75 (NGC 6124), an open cluster in the constellation Scorpius
