= S75 =

S75 may refer to:

- S75 (Berlin), a S-Bahn line
- Daihatsu Hijet (S75), a Japanese van
- INS Leviathan (S75), a submarine of the Israeli Navy
- S-75 Dvina, a Soviet surface-to-air missile
- Savoia-Marchetti SM.75 Marsupiale, an Italian transport aircraft
- Sikorsky S-75, an American prototype helicopter
- S75, a postcode district for Barnsley, England
