= 75th Regiment =

75th Regiment or 75th Infantry Regiment may refer to:

- 75th Regiment of Foot (disambiguation), several units of the British Army
- 75th (Middlesex) Searchlight Regiment, Royal Artillery
- 75th Cavalry Regiment, United States
- 75th Field Artillery Regiment, United States
- 75th Infantry Regiment (United States)
- 75th Infantry Regiment (Ranger), United States (1969–1986)
- 75th Ranger Regiment (United States)
- 75th Carnatic Infantry, British Indian Army

Union Army (American Civil War):

- 75th Illinois Volunteer Infantry Regiment
- 75th Indiana Infantry Regiment
- 75th Ohio Infantry
- 75th Pennsylvania Infantry

== See also ==
- 75th Brigade (disambiguation)
- 75th Division (disambiguation)
