= 75th Brigade =

75th Brigade may refer to:

== British India ==
- 75th Indian Infantry Brigade

== United Kingdom ==
- 75th Brigade (United Kingdom)
- 75th Brigade, Royal Field Artillery, British Army unit during World War I
- 75th (Highland) Brigade, Royal Field Artillery, British Army unit after World War I

== United States ==
- 75th Field Artillery Brigade (United States)

== See also ==
- 75th Division (disambiguation)
- 75th Regiment (disambiguation)
