= 75 =

75 may refer to:

- 75 (number), the natural number following 74 and preceding 76
- one of the years 75 BC, AD 75, 1975, 2075
- 75 (album), an album by Joe Zawinul
- 75 Eurydike, a main-belt asteroid

== Vehicles ==
- Alfa Romeo 75, a compact executive sedan
- Tatra 75, a mid-size car
- Various Rover models:
  - Rover 75, an executive car
  - Rover 75, a saloon
  - Rover 75, a large family car

== See also ==
- 75th (disambiguation)
- Canon de 75 modèle 1897 (the 75, or, French 75)
- M75 (disambiguation)
- List of highways numbered 75
