= Nightfall (missile) =

British short-range ballistic missile

The Nightfall is a short-range ballistic missile under development by the United Kingdom.

== Development ==
In August 2025 the UK Ministry of Defence published a request for information (RFI) for the missile. While initial requirements specified a 300 kg (660 lb) (high explosive) payload and 600 km (370 mi) range, with some basic maneuverability, they were later reduced to 200 kg (440 lb) and 500 km (310 mi). A ground vehicle must have the ability to deliver multiple missiles.

Industry partners that had signed confidentiality agreements were given the requirements on the 19th December 2025. The deadline for proposals is the 9th February 2026 and it is intended to award development contracts in March 2026. The intention is for three partners to each be awarded a £9 million development contract and to produce their first three missiles before April 2027 for test launches.

== Role ==
The Nightfall missile is intended to complement the Ukrainians' existing American ATACMS and Ukrainian 1KR1 Sapsan missiles.

== See also ==
- Precision Strike Missile
