= GMARS =

- Type: Multiple rocket launcher
- Place of origin: Germany / United States

Production history
- Manufacturer: Rheinmetall / Lockheed Martin

Specifications
- Mass: 31.14 t (68,700 lb) (GVW) < 40.0 t (88,200 lb) (combat weight)
- Length: 9.8 m (32 ft)
- Width: 2.5 m (8.2 ft)
- Height: 3.8 m (12 ft) (stowed)
- Crew: 2 (maximum cabin capacity of 3)
- Operational range: 700 km (430 mi)
- Maximum speed: 100 km/h (62 mph)

The Global Mobile Artillery Rocket System (GMARS, /ˈɡmɑːrz/) is a wheeled multiple rocket launcher built and designed by Rheinmetall and Lockheed Martin, with them first partnering up in 2023. It is claimed to be capable of providing fire support at a range of up to 400 km (250 mi). It is similar to the M270 multiple launch rocket system and has a two-pod launcher that can fire the MLRS family of munitions, including the MGM-140 ATACMS and Precision Strike Missile.

== History ==
=== Background ===
It was first shown at Eurosatory 2024 using the chassis of the RMMV HX2 8×8 tactical truck as a base.

=== Prototype and trial phase ===
First live fire test occurred in August 2025.

== Weapons ==
=== Current weapons ===
It is said by Rheinmetall and Lockheed Martin that the GMARS launcher will be able to fire 12 GMLRS or ER GMRLS, 2 ATACMS, and 4 Precision Strike Missile missiles.

Munition	Manufacturers	Origin	Diameter	Range	Warhead (warhead mass)	Quantity of missiles	Notes
GMLRS
M30 A1	Lockheed Martin Northrop Grumman (Orbital ATK)	United States	227 mm (8.9 in)	10 to 70 km (6.2 to 43.5 mi) (official) 15 to 92 km (9.3 to 57.2 mi) (known range)	Alternative Warhead 91 kg (201 lb)	12 pcs / GMARS 6 pcs / pod	
M30 A2	Lockheed Martin Northrop Grumman (Orbital ATK)	United States	227 mm (8.9 in)	10 to 70 km (6.2 to 43.5 mi) (official) 15 to 92 km (9.3 to 57.2 mi) (known range)	Alternative Warhead 91 kg (201 lb)	12 pcs / GMARS 6 pcs / pod	
M31	Lockheed Martin General Dynamics	United States	227 mm (8.9 in)	10 to 70 km (6.2 to 43.5 mi) (official) 15 to 92 km (9.3 to 57.2 mi) (known range)	HE Unitary Warhead 89 kg (196 lb)	12 pcs / GMARS 6 pcs / pod	
M31 A1	Lockheed Martin General Dynamics	United States	227 mm (8.9 in)	10 to 70 km (6.2 to 43.5 mi) (official) 15 to 92 km (9.3 to 57.2 mi) (known range)	HE Unitary Warhead 89 kg (196 lb)	12 pcs / GMARS 6 pcs / pod	
M31 A2	Lockheed Martin General Dynamics	United States	227 mm (8.9 in)	10 to 70 km (6.2 to 43.5 mi) (official) 15 to 92 km (9.3 to 57.2 mi) (known range)	HE Unitary Warhead 89 kg (196 lb)	12 pcs / GMARS 6 pcs / pod	
ER GMLRS	Lockheed Martin Northrop Grumman (Orbital ATK)	United States	254 mm (10.0 in)	150 km (93 mi)	Alternative Warhead 91 kg (201 lb)	12 pcs / GMARS 6 pcs / pod	
ER GMLRS	Lockheed Martin General Dynamics	United States	254 mm (10.0 in)	150 km (93 mi)	HE Unitary Warhead 89 kg (196 lb)	12 pcs / GMARS 6 pcs / pod	
Ground Launched Small Diameter Bomb
GLSDB	Boeing Saab AB	United States Sweden	240 mm (9.4 in)	150 km (93 mi)	GBU-39/B - SDM I (Small diameter bomb) Guided bomb: 93 kg (205 lb)	12 pcs / GMARS 6 pcs / pod	
ATACMS
M48	Lockheed Martin	United States	610 mm (24 in)	70 to 270 km (43 to 168 mi)	WDU-18/B 227 kg (500 lb)	2 pcs / GMARS 1 pce / pod	
M57	Lockheed Martin	United States	610 mm (24 in)	70 to 300 km (43 to 186 mi)	WAU-23/B 227 kg (500 lb)	2 pcs / GMARS 1 pce / pod	
M57Ei	Lockheed Martin	United States	610 mm (24 in)	70 to 300 km (43 to 186 mi)	Airburst WAU-23/B 227 kg (500 lb)	2 pcs / GMARS 1 pce / pod	
PrSM
PrSM (increment 1)	Lockheed Martin	United States	430 mm (17 in)	60 to 499 km (37 to 310 mi) (official) 60 to 650 km (37 to 404 mi) (known range)	Optimised unitary warhead 91 kg (201 lb)	4 pcs / GMARS 2 pcs / pod	

=== Future weapons ===
There are currently plans to integrate surface launched cruise missiles and 122 mm rocket pods in the future.

== Operators ==
=== Potential operators ===
Germany
The GMARS is currently competing against the Euro-PULS to fully replace the German Army's MARS II systems.

== See also ==
- M142 HIMARS – (United States), same ammo pod as GMARS
- K239 Chunmoo – (South Korea), local weapon pods, and compatible with HIMARS pods
- Astros II – (Brazil)
- BM-21 – (Soviet Union)
- BM-30 Smerch – (Soviet Union)
- TOS-2 – (Russia)
- PHL-03 – (China)
- LAR-160 – (Israel)
- PULS (multiple rocket launcher) – (Israel)
- Pinaka multi-barrel rocket launcher – (India)
- Fajr-5 – (Iran)
- Fath-360 – (Iran)
- Fatah-I - (Pakistan)
- T-122 Sakarya – (Turkey)
