= Precision Strike Missile =

U.S. rocket artillery fired tactical ballistic missile

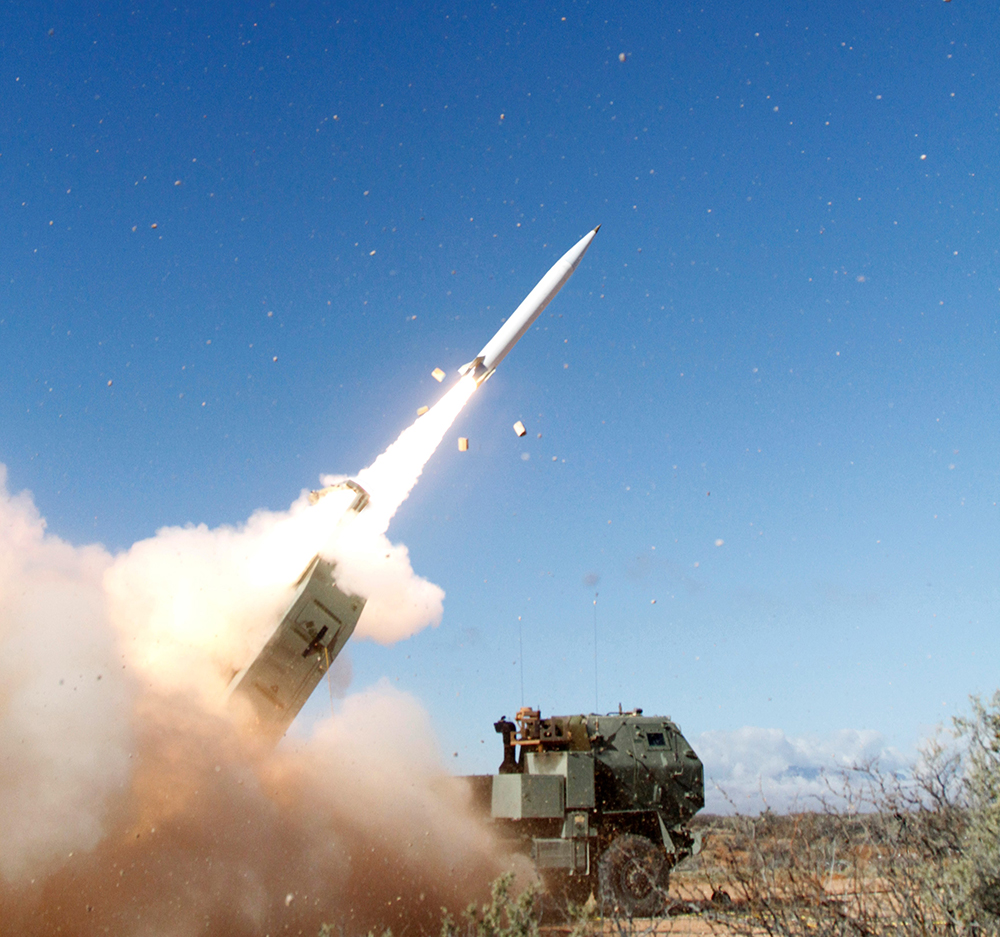
- Prototype test flight of the PrSM on 10 December 2019, at the White Sands Missile Range
- Type: Rocket artillery Short-range ballistic missile Medium-range ballistic missile Anti-ship ballistic missile
- Place of origin: United States

Service history
- In service: 2023–present
- Used by: United States; Australia
- Wars: 2026 Iran war

Production history
- Designer: Lockheed Martin Missiles and Fire Control
- Unit cost: < $3.5 million (Increment One)

Specifications
- Mass: unknown
- Length: 13 ft (4.0 m)
- Diameter: 17 in (430 mm)
- Maximum firing range: ≥ 310 mi (500 km)
- Warhead: HE fragmentation blast; Unknown number of submunitions; Future iterations will possibly include Coyote drones and Hatchet miniature glide bombs from Northrop Grumman.
- Warhead weight: 200 lb (91 kg)
- Propellant: solid-propellant rocket
- Guidance system: Base: INS + GPS; Land-based anti-ship missile: Base + anti-radiation seeker + Imaging Infrared (IIR)
- Launch platform: M270 MLRS, M142 HIMARS, GMARS

The Precision Strike Missile (PrSM; PRI-zim) is a series of ballistic missiles, both short- and later medium-range, developed by Lockheed Martin to replace the MGM-140 ATACMS. The early variant of this missile, Increment One, is currently in service with both the United States Army and Australian Army. Increment Two will have an anti-ship targeting capability and later Increment variants will have modular payloads capabilities and an increased range out to 1,000 km (620 mi). Australia is a partner in the program to develop Increments Two, Three and Four.

The Precision Strike Missile is currently only capable of being fired from the M142 HIMARS launcher; plans are being explored to make the missile capable of being fired from surface ships through the Mark 41 vertical launching system. Australia and the United States are currently the only nations that possess the missile: Norway's request for export was denied and the United Kingdom is considering purchasing it.

The PrSM, along with other American and Australian missiles, is planned to be manufactured at a complex in Australia, augmenting domestic production in the United States. The missile was first used in combat by the United States during the 2026 Iran war, though its use was limited because of low inventory.

== Development ==
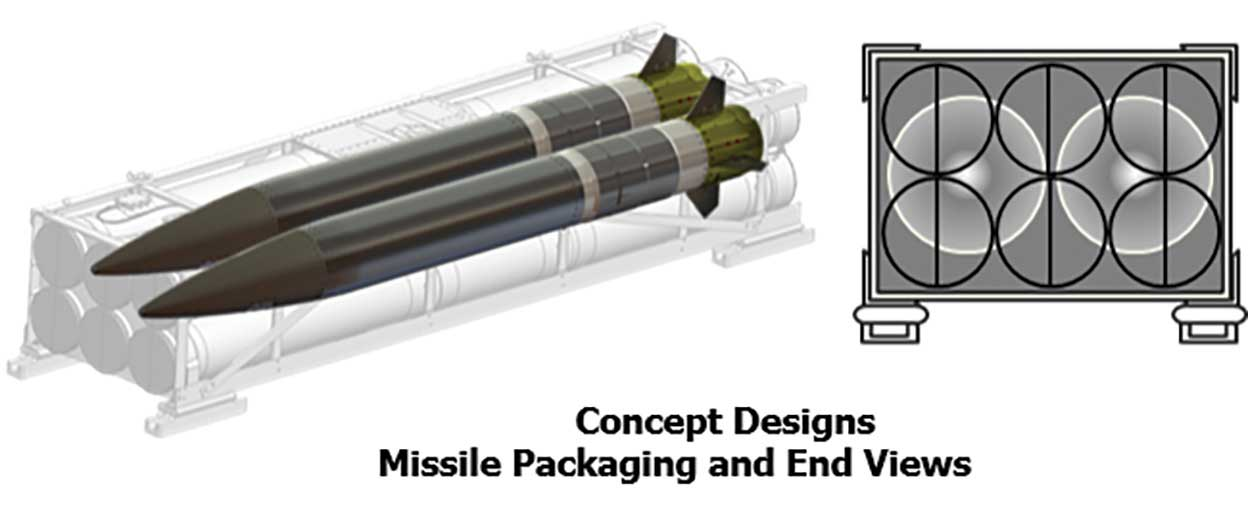
A concept design for the Precision Strike Missile

In March 2016, Lockheed Martin, Boeing, and Raytheon announced they would bid on a missile to meet the US Army's Long Range Precision Fires (LRPF) requirement to replace the ATACMS. The PrSM will use advanced propulsion technology to fly faster and farther (originally out to 310 mi or 500 km). It is also designed to be thinner and sleeker, increasing the number of missiles per pod to two, and doubling the capacity of the M270 MLRS and M142 HIMARS launchers. Boeing and Raytheon were involved in the competitive effort, but both left the competition in early 2020, leaving Lockheed Martin to develop the missile. The weapon was planned to achieve initial operational capability in 2023; the initial PrSM will only be able to hit stationary targets on land, but later versions will track moving targets on land and sea. With the United States withdrawal from the Intermediate-Range Nuclear Forces Treaty, the range of the PrSM is to be increased beyond the 310 mi (500 km) limitation imposed by the treaty.

In June 2020, the Army had begun testing a new multi-mode seeker, an upgrade for the Precision Strike Missile. The upgraded seeker is expected to be part of a major program improvement planned for 2025. Technological advancements including the potential application of ramjet technology could extend the weapon's range up to 620 mi (1,000 km).

In July 2021, the US announced that Australia had become a partner in the PrSM Program with the Australian Army signing a memorandum of understanding for Increment 2 of the program with the US Army's Defense Exports and Cooperation and had contributed US$54 million. In January 2024, Australia committed to continue the partnership with the US and will subsequently also purchase PrSM Increments 3 and 4. In June 2025, Australia signed a Memorandum of Understanding with the US for production, sustainment and follow-on development which includes for the production of the PrSM in Australia. Australia contributed A$310 million over ten years to the cooperative program.

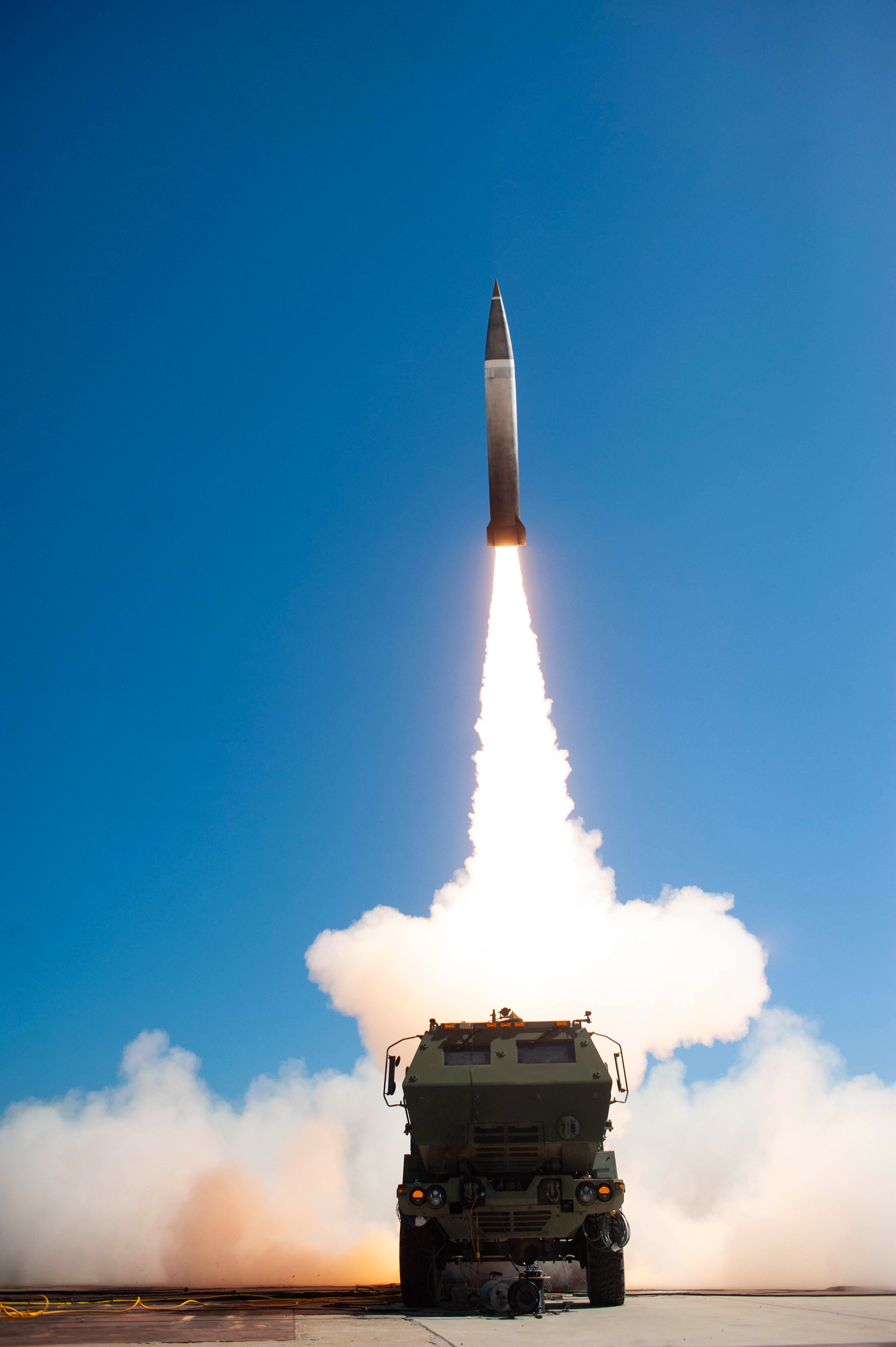
Precision Strike Missile launching from an M142 HIMARS

The United Kingdom, as part of an upgrade to the British Army's M270 MLRS to the M270A2 standard, has hinted that it may possibly acquire PrSM.

On 8 December 2023, the US Army announced that the first PrSM batch had been delivered. On 17 June 2024, the decommissioned Austin-class amphibious transport dock USS Cleveland was sunk as a target ship in the North Pacific Ocean's Mariana Island Range Complex, apparently in the first test of the PrSM on a moving target.

On 26 August 2024, it was announced that the US has turned down a request from Norway to acquire the Precision Strike Missile (PrSM).

On 23 January 2025, the Baltic Defence Cooperation Ministerial Committee expressed the common interest of the Baltic States in the acquisition of the HIMARS Precision Strike Missile (PrSM) by signing the Joint Statement.

== Usage ==
In March 2026, the U.S. Central Command released images of an M142 HIMARS employing the Precision Strike Missile (PrSM) in strikes on Iranian military targets during Operation Epic Fury, marking PrSM's first confirmed combat use. The missiles have struck many targets. The Center for Strategic and International Studies estimated that much of the PrSM inventory was used during the campaign as the United States began the war with a low inventory.

Iran's state news agency, Islamic Republic News Agency (IRNA), reported 21 people killed, in a missile strike on a sports hall and an adjacent elementary school in the Iranian city of Lamerd on 28 February 2026. The New York Times and BBC both reported that PrSMs were the weapon used.

In April 2026, the US Central Command requested that the Dark Eagle hypersonic missile be sent to the Middle East for potential deployment against Iran in the war, marking the first time Washington would deploy the technology, according to Bloomberg. According to a person with direct knowledge of the issue, US CENTCOM made the request after Iran moved its missile launchers out of range of the US Army's PrSMs, the current technology it has deployed.

== Variants ==
The PrSM has four "increments" either in development or to be developed.

=== Increment One ===
Increment One is the current missile in use by the United States Army. It has a treaty-bound range of 310 mi (500 km), and does not contain a multi-mode seeker. It is gradually replacing the MGM-140 ATACMS tactical ballistic missiles. Australia operates this variant as of July 2025.

=== Increment Two ===
Increment Two features a multi-mode seeker consisting of radio frequency and imaging infra-red to engage desired target sets in an anti-access/area denial environment. Increment Two will be a Land Based Anti-Ship Missile system with its multi-mode seeker able to engage maritime moving targets. It will also be able to engage relocatable land targets.

A first live test was conducted in 2026. Initial operational capability is scheduled for FY28.

Increment Two was in a contest with an Australian made system, StrikeMaster, firing the Naval Strike Missile for an Australian coastal defence system contract. In April 2026, Increment Two was selected for the Australian Army.

=== Increment Three ===
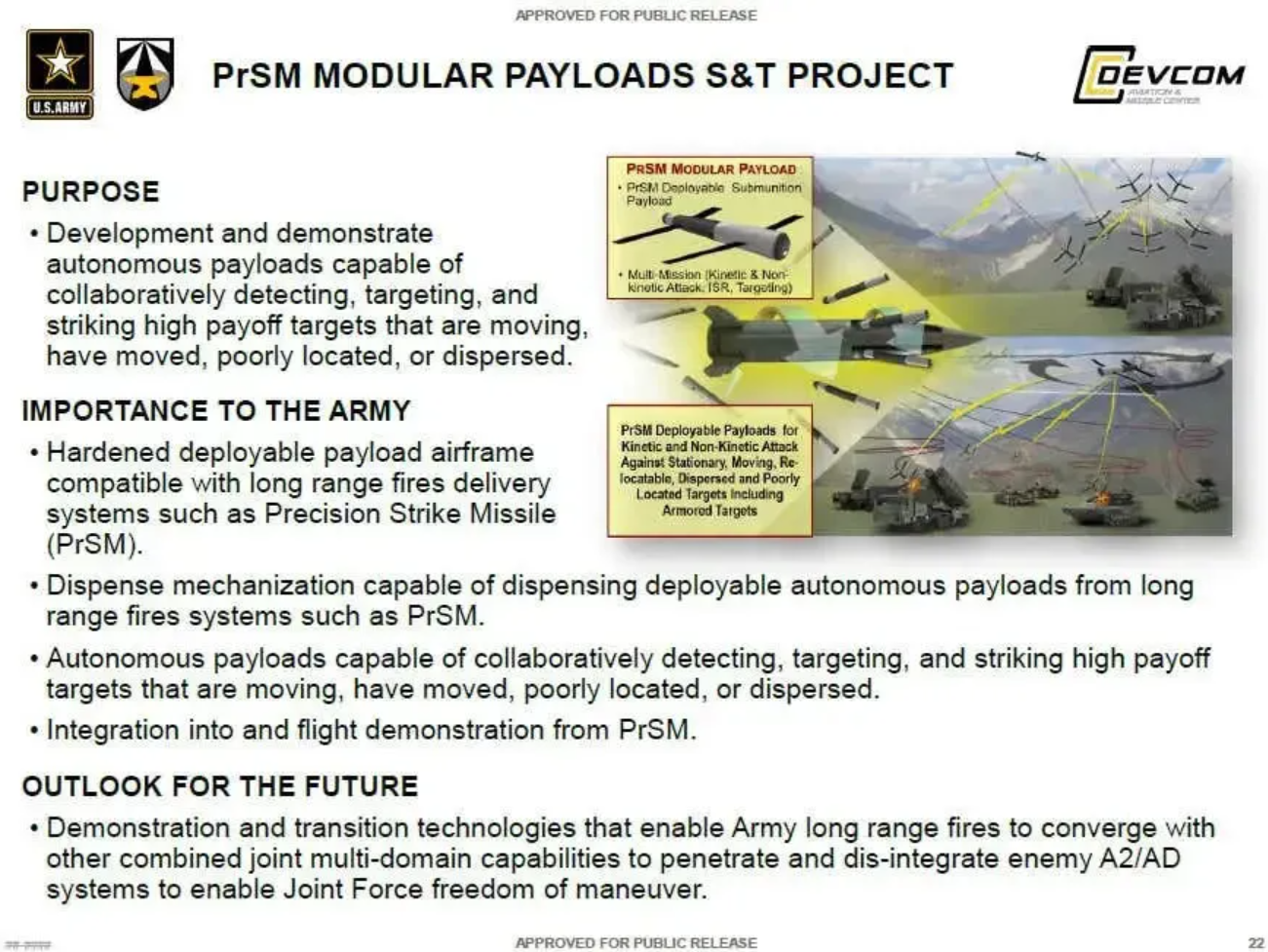
The US Army's proposed modular payload project for the Precision Strike Missile Increment 3

Increment Three of the missile will include most of the same technology of Increments One and Two. Its main addition is to be the extension of the variety of armaments for the missile can carry, with it likely carrying more explosive munitions. Increment Three is to be designed for use as an anti-fortification weapon, likely being able to destroy more structures. There is no information available as to when Increment Three is to be procured by the United States Armed Forces or the Australian Army. However it is believed they will be made available following Increments one, two and four. According to Lockheed Martin, a new warhead will be included in Increment Three, and the Army is looking at including submunition capabilities, including the Raytheon Coyote drone family and the Orbital ATK Hatchet miniature glide bomb.

=== Increment Four ===
Increment Four has a focus on the extension of the range of the missile, whilst containing most of the technology of Increments One, Two, and likely Three. Four will aim to extend the range beyond the 500 km (310 mi) range of Increment One to 1,000 km (620 mi) or more. It will advance the technology of propulsion, and aerodynamics to achieve this range. Increment Four is currently being competed for contracts by; Lockheed Martin, as well as a combined Raytheon-Northrop Grumman team. In June 2026, L3Harris Technologies successfully tested a potential propulsion solution for Lockheed Martin. Lockheed Martin is planning to conduct flight testing in late 2026.

=== Increment Five ===
In December 2024, the director of the Long-Range Precision Fires Cross Functional Team, Brig. Gen. Rory Crooks, separately explained that initial work on a fifth increment is underway, and a science and technology development initiative will kick-off in fiscal year 2026. The idea, he explained, is to design a missile that can be fired from an autonomous vehicle. "If you’re familiar with an [M270 Multiple Launch Rocket System] MLRS pod, it's about 13-feet long [4 meters]", the one-star general told the audience. "If you have something without a cab, that's autonomous, you might be able to employ something longer than that."

== Operators ==
=== Current operators ===
Australia

- Australian Army – In July 2025, Australia test fired one of their first PrSM Increment 1s during Exercise Talisman Sabre. Australia will utilize the variants of the missile for both long-range land strike and maritime defence.

United States

- United States Army

=== Future operators ===
United Kingdom

- British Army – In its latest Defence Investment Plan, released 30 June 2026, the United Kingdom declared it would join the Precision Strike Missile Programme. It will place an order of £190m. The missiles will be used by its M270A2 Multiple Launch Rocket System (MLRS) fleet.

Sweden

- Swedish Army – In September 2026, Sweden signed a deal for HIMARS systems that also includes PrSM munitions.

=== Failed bids ===
Norway – A Norwegian request to buy PrSM was turned down by U.S. authorities in August 2024, due to export restrictions at the time. A simultaneous request for M57 ATACMS and M142 HIMARS launchers was however approved, but both were ultimately turned down in favor of the South Korean K239 Chunmoo with associated missiles.

== See also ==
- OpFires – DARPA's experimental hypersonic glide vehicle medium-range ballistic missile program
- Nightfall (missile)
