= Lockheed Martin Missiles and Fire Control =

Business unit

Lockheed Martin Missiles and Fire Control (MFC) is one of the four core business areas for American company Lockheed Martin.

MFC provides air and missile defense systems; tactical missiles and air-to-ground precision strike weapon systems; logistics; fire control systems; mission operations support, readiness, engineering support and integration services, and manned and unmanned ground vehicles. MFC also has contracts with the U.S. Government for various classified programs.

MFC has approximately 15,500 employees. It is based in the Dallas suburb of Grand Prairie, Texas. Major LM MFC facilities are located in Orlando, Florida; Grand Prairie, Texas; Archbald, Pennsylvania; Chelmsford, Massachusetts; East Camden, Arkansas; Horizon City, Texas; Lufkin, Texas; Ocala, Florida; Santa Barbara, California; Troy, Alabama, and Ampthill, Bedfordshire (a part of Lockheed Martin UK).

== Financials ==
MFC made $1.4 billion in operating profit on sales of $10.1 billion in 2019. This was out of total Lockheed Martin profits of $6.6 billion on sales of $59.8 billion. Lockheed Martin projects MFC's 2020 profits will be $1.5 billion on sales of $11.0-11.3 billion. For context, based on 2019 sales, this would put MFC at No. 314 on the 2019 Fortune 500 were it a stand-alone corporation.

== History ==
MFC became a Lockheed Martin business area on December 31, 2012, when the Lockheed Martin Electronic Systems business area was split into two new business areas: MFC and Mission Systems and Training (MST was later renamed Rotary and Mission Systems with the acquisition of Sikorsky). Prior to that, MFC was a business unit operating within the Electronic Systems business area. In 2012, the MFC business unit was a recipient of the Malcolm Baldrige National Quality Award.

The Grand Prairie facility dates back to being a major component of the now defunct LTV Corporation, as LTV Aerospace and Defense with "Vought" Division names, and later became part of Loral as Loral Vought Systems, before Loral's merger with Lockheed Martin.

On May 22, 2024, the unit was sanctioned by the Chinese government due to arms sales to Taiwan.

== Programs ==
Major programs include: the Patriot Advanced Capability-3 (PAC-3) and Terminal High Altitude Area Defense (THAAD) air and missile defense programs; the Multiple Launch Rocket System (MLRS), Hellfire, Joint Air-to-Surface Standoff Missile (JASSM) and Javelin tactical missile programs; the Apache, SNIPER and Low Altitude Navigation and Targeting Infrared for Night (LANTIRN) fire control systems programs; and the Special Operations Forces Global Logistics Support Services (SOF GLSS) program.

Primary MFC customers include the U.S. Army, Navy, Air Force, Marine Corps, NASA and U.S. allies. MFC also has customers in the global civil nuclear power industry.

One of Missiles and Fire Control's most lucrative program is the TADS/PNVS (Target Acquisition Designation Sight, Pilot Night Vision System) program for the AH-64 Apache helicopter. The second generation M-TADS (also known as Arrowhead) is now being fielded to United States Army and foreign customers. The company also is a major supplier of Electro-Optic systems to the Joint Strike Fighter (JSF), officially known as the F-35 Lightning II. The company has a long history from the Vought years (later half of the 20th century) of being the number-one supplier of missiles and advanced weapon systems to the US Army, which continues to this day.

== Major products ==
- Air and Missile Defense
  - PAC-3 Missile
  - THAAD System
- Strike Weapons
  - AIM-260 JATM
  - JASSM
- Tactical Missiles
  - AGM-179 JAGM Missile
  - Hellfire Missile
  - Javelin Missile
  - Joint Common Missile
  - Longbow Missile
  - HIMARS
  - ATACMS
  - MLRS
  - Long Range Land Attack Projectile
- Sensors and Fire Control
  - Sniper targeting pod for U.S. Air Force aircraft
