= USS Cleveland (LPD-7) =

Former US Navy amphibious transport dock

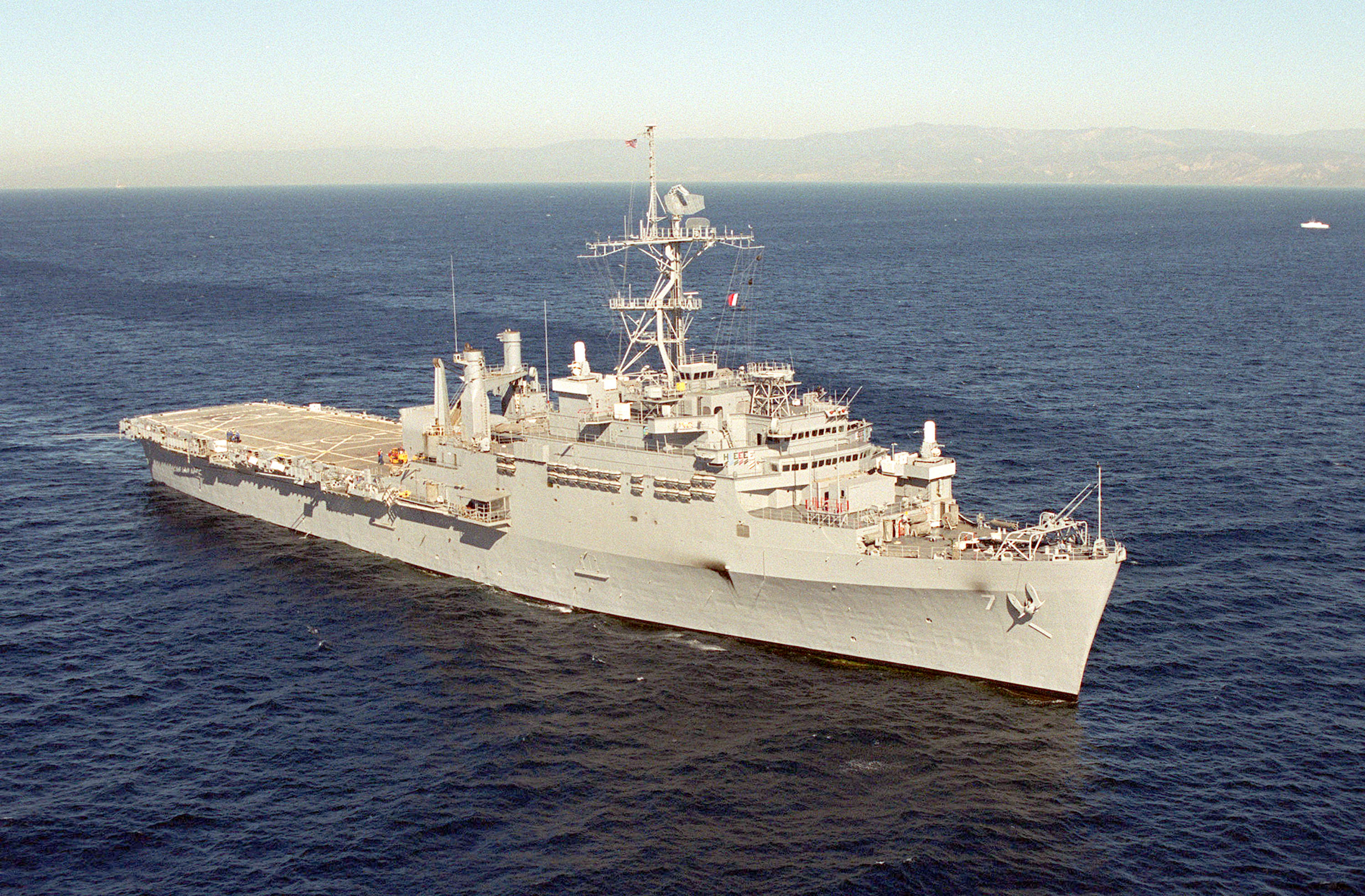
- USS Cleveland in February 2000

History

United States
- Name: Cleveland
- Namesake: Cleveland, Ohio
- Operator: United States Navy
- Ordered: 25 January 1963
- Builder: Ingalls Shipbuilding
- Laid down: 30 November 1964
- Launched: 7 May 1966
- Commissioned: 21 April 1967
- Decommissioned: 30 September 2011
- Stricken: 13 November 2017
- Identification: Hull number: LPD-7
- Fate: Sunk as target, 17 June 2024

General characteristics
- Class & type: Austin-class amphibious transport dock
- Tonnage: 7,592 DWT
- Displacement: 9,734 long tons (9,890 t) light; 17,326 long tons (17,604 t) full
- Length: 569 ft 11 in (173.7 m) overall; 547 ft 11 in (167 m) waterline
- Beam: 99 ft 9 in (30.4 m) extreme; 84 ft 0 in (25.6 m) waterline
- Draft: 22 ft 0 in (6.7 m) maximum
- Speed: 21 knots (39 km/h; 24 mph)
- Complement: 164 officers, 396 enlisted, 840 troops, 90 flag staff
- Armament: Initially: 4 × 3 in (76 mm)/50 caliber AA guns, 2 × 25 mm Mk 38 chain guns, 2 × Phalanx CIWS, 8 × .50-caliber machine guns
- Aircraft carried: two CH-46 Sea Knights or two CH-53 Sea Stallions or four UH-1 Iroquois ("Hueys") or AH-1 Cobras or two AV-8 Harriers

USS Cleveland (LPD-7), an Austin-class amphibious transport dock, was the third ship of the United States Navy to be named for the city in Ohio. Her keel was laid down at Ingalls Shipbuilding of Pascagoula, Mississippi. She was launched on 7 May 1966, and was commissioned on 21 April 1967 at Norfolk, Virginia. At the time of decommissioning, she was the third-oldest commissioned ship in the US Navy, behind USS Constitution ("Old Ironsides") and USS Enterprise.

After commissioning, Cleveland changed homeport to San Diego, California, to become a member of the Pacific Fleet's Amphibious Force. Cleveland divided her time between operations in the Eastern Pacific and extended deployments to the Western Pacific. Cleveland was normally assigned as part of an Amphibious Readiness Group (ARG) and, with her embarked Marines and other forces, performed a wide variety of missions.

In 2024, She was used as a SINKEX target and hit by Land Based Anti-Ship Missile.

== 1960s to 1980s ==
Cleveland first saw action during the Tet Offensive in 1968. In 1972 Cleveland served close in shore in the DMZ region as a platform for seven Marine AH-1 Cobra helicopters performing operations on NVA troop and supply lines. In January 1973 Cleveland was in a task force on its way to make a landing with Marines in North Vietnam when the Paris peace treaty was signed. After the Vietnam War cease-fire in January 1973, Cleveland joined Task Force 78 in the mine-clearing effort of Haiphong Harbor and Operation End Sweep. Cleveland then began a series of seven Western Pacific deployments between 1974 and 1985.

The ship was assigned duties as the United States Third Fleet flagship from January through November 1988. Cleveland then briefly shifted focus to environmental protection when she deployed to Prince William Sound, Alaska, in support of oil spill cleanup efforts associated with the Exxon Valdez disaster.

== 1990s ==
The ship's next two deployments, in 1990 and 1991, were in support of Operation Desert Shield and Operation Desert Storm. In October 1992 and in March 1993, Cleveland deployed on short notice to Central America in support of law enforcement operations, or LEO OPS where she was the first LPD to embark an SH-60 Seahawk helicopter. During the March 1993 deployment, Cleveland and the embarked Coast Guard Law Enforcement Detachment (LEDET) played a key role in what was the largest maritime cocaine seizure to date involving the motor vessel Sea Chariot. This was the result of an unprecedented Joint Counter Drug Mission between the United States Navy and the Colombian Navy called Operation Emerald. These two deployments included four transits of the Panama Canal and steaming over 20,000 miles (32,000 km).

While deployed to the Western Pacific in 1994, Cleveland participated in United Nations relief efforts in Rwanda and the relocation of the United States Liaison office from Mogadishu, Somalia, to Nairobi, Kenya. Following the relocation efforts, Cleveland was ordered to steam into the North Persian Gulf to assist in deterring Iraq's massing of troops on the Kuwaiti border as part of Operation Vigilant Warrior.

Her next inter-deployment cycle was highlighted by Exercise RIMPAC '96 off the coast of Hawaii, which included the first ever multilateral exercise involving US and Russian forces in US waters. The trip to Hawaii for the exercise culminated in a parade of ships for the 50th anniversary celebration to commemorate the end of the Pacific War. Cleveland returned to the North Persian Gulf during her deployment in 1996 and 1997, participating in coalition and bilateral exercises and achieving yet another milestone as the first Amphibious Warship to actively participate in Maritime Interdiction Operations (MIO) in support of United Nations sanctions against Iraq.

In the summer of 1998, Cleveland once again participated in the bi-annual RIMPAC exercise. Cleveland then began her sixteenth major deployment in December 1998, embarking Navy SEALs, elements of the 13th MEU(SOC) – Marine Expeditionary Unit (Special Operation Capable) – and a detachment of unmanned aerial vehicles (UAVs). During this deployment Cleveland stood off the Horn of Africa, inserting a military liaison team into Eritrea and remaining ready to conduct a non-combatant evacuation operation. Cleveland then returned to the Persian Gulf to conduct MIO where she served as flagship for the commander of all MIO forces in the Persian Gulf. During this period, an embarked UAV discovered an Iraqi surface-to-surface missile site that was threatening coalition forces. Aircraft from USS Enterprise destroyed this missile site while the UAV transmitted live imagery back to Cleveland.

== 2000s ==
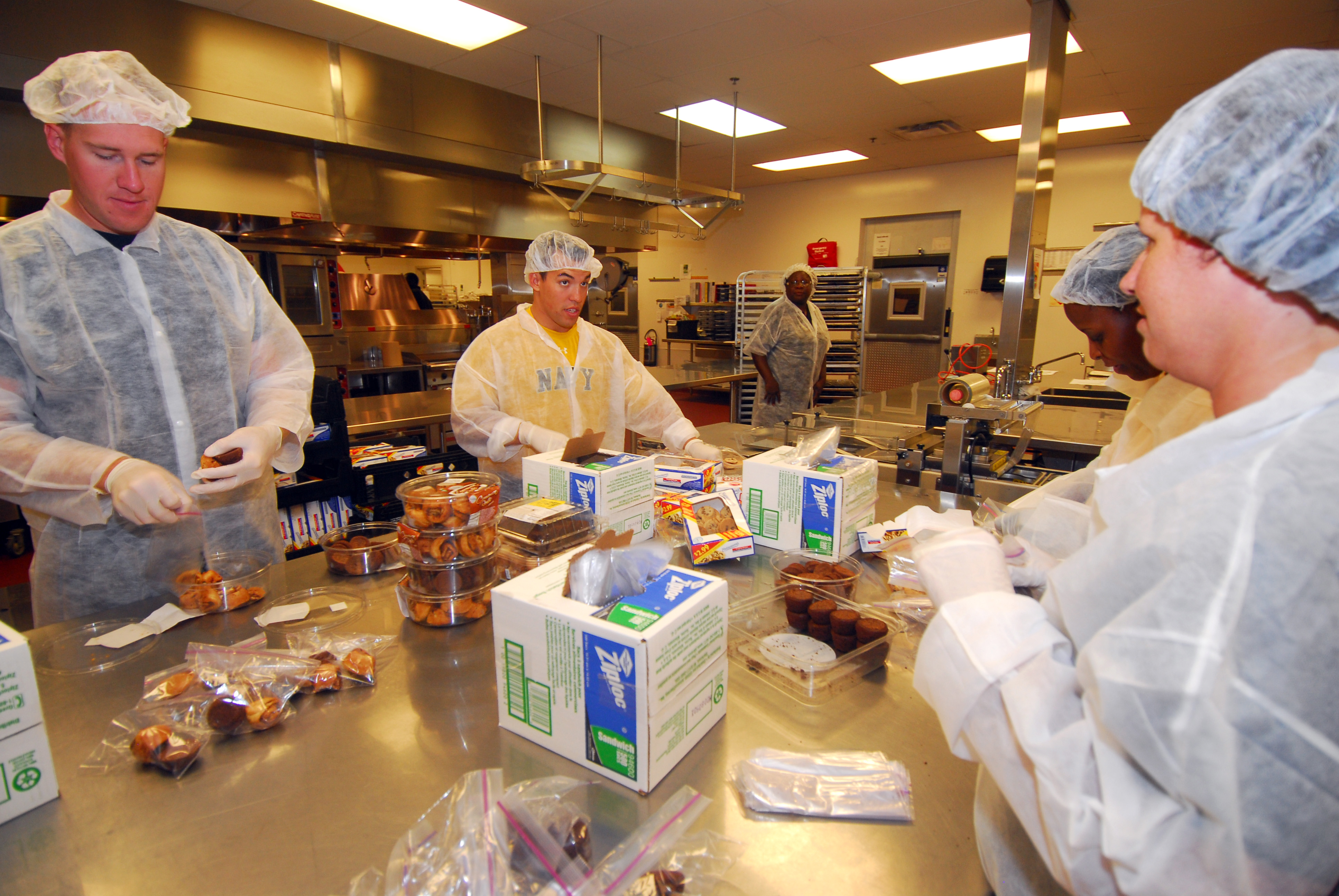
Packing food for distribution to various locations throughout the Cleveland metropolitan area during a Cleveland Navy Week community service event

Cleveland was once again called upon to perform outside her normal realm of operations while participating in recovery and salvage efforts of Alaska Airlines flight 261 in February 2000, receiving the Coast Guard Unit Commendation with Operational Distinguishing Device. Following a Fleet Week visit to San Francisco, California, Cleveland completed her training cycle and deployed for the seventeenth time in March 2001.

Deployed in January 2003 in support of operations relevant to the beginning of the ground war which was dubbed Operation Iraqi Freedom by the United States and commenced on 20 March 2003 (prior to 19 March, the mission in Iraq was called Operation Enduring Freedom, a carryover from the War in Afghanistan). The invasion consisted of 21 days of major combat operations, in which a combined force of troops from the United States, the United Kingdom, Australia and Poland invaded Iraq and deposed the Ba'athist government of Saddam Hussein. Cleveland sailed as part of the USN Magnificent Seven. Embarked were USMC Amphibious Task Force West and Landing Force West w/ HMM 163 and supporting USMC elements.

Cleveland arrived in San Diego on 4 August 2011, returning from Pacific Partnership 2011, concluding the ship's final mission prior to its decommissioning. During the course of the ship's final mission, the medical contingent treated 38,696 patients at medical and dental civic action projects, or MEDCAPs and DENCAPs.

Both governments of the U.S. and Mexico could not come to an agreement regarding the sale of the vessel; therefore the ship continued on active duty until its decommissioning on 30 September 2011.

The ship was stricken from the naval registry on 13 November 2017. As of November 2017, the ship was moored in the Naval Inactive Ship Maintenance Facility at Pearl Harbor, Hawaii. She was sunk as a target during naval live-fire exercise 'Valiant Shield 2024' by the 7th Fleet flagship USS Blue Ridge in the north Pacific Ocean in coordination with the Multi-Domain Task Force and 181 Field Artillery Regiment of the Tennessee National Guard. The ship was hit as target by a PrSM Increment 2 anti-ship ballistic missile.

== Awards ==
In her 44 years of service, Cleveland received two Combat Action Ribbons, the Joint Meritorious Unit Award, the Navy Unit Commendation, three Meritorious Unit Commendations, eight Navy Excellence Ribbons, three Armed Forces Expeditionary Medals, 23 Vietnam Service Medals, the Southwest Asia Service Medal, the Humanitarian Service Medal, the Coast Guard Unit Commendation with Operational Distinguishing Device, and three Vietnam Gallantry Cross Unit Citation.
