= 10th Army Corps (Republic of China) =

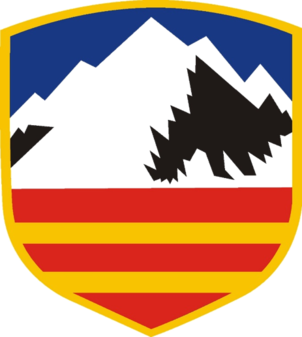
- Patch of the 10th Army Corps
- Active: 1950–present
- Country: Republic of China
- Branch: Republic of China Army
- Type: Corps

The 10th Army Corps, Republic of China Army is an army corps. It is tasked with defending central Taiwan.

== History ==
The Central Taiwan Defense Command was formed in 1950 in Kaohsiung, southern Taiwan, and became the 2nd Army Corps in 1954. In 1972 the corps was moved to Taichung in central Taiwan. In January 1976 it was renamed the 5th Army Corps and in August of the same year it became the 10th Army Corps.

In 2021 it was announced that the corps will become part of the 5th Combat Theater Command.

== Organization ==
The 10th Army Corps Headquarters was renamed the 10th Army Corps Command in 2006.

The structure of the corps is as follows:

- 234th Mechanized Infantry Brigade
- 586th Armored Brigade
- 58th Artillery Command
- 52nd Engineer Group
- 36th Chemical Warfare Group
- 74th Signals Group
