= ATACMS =

American tactical ballistic missile

MGM-140 Army Tactical Missile System (ATACMS)
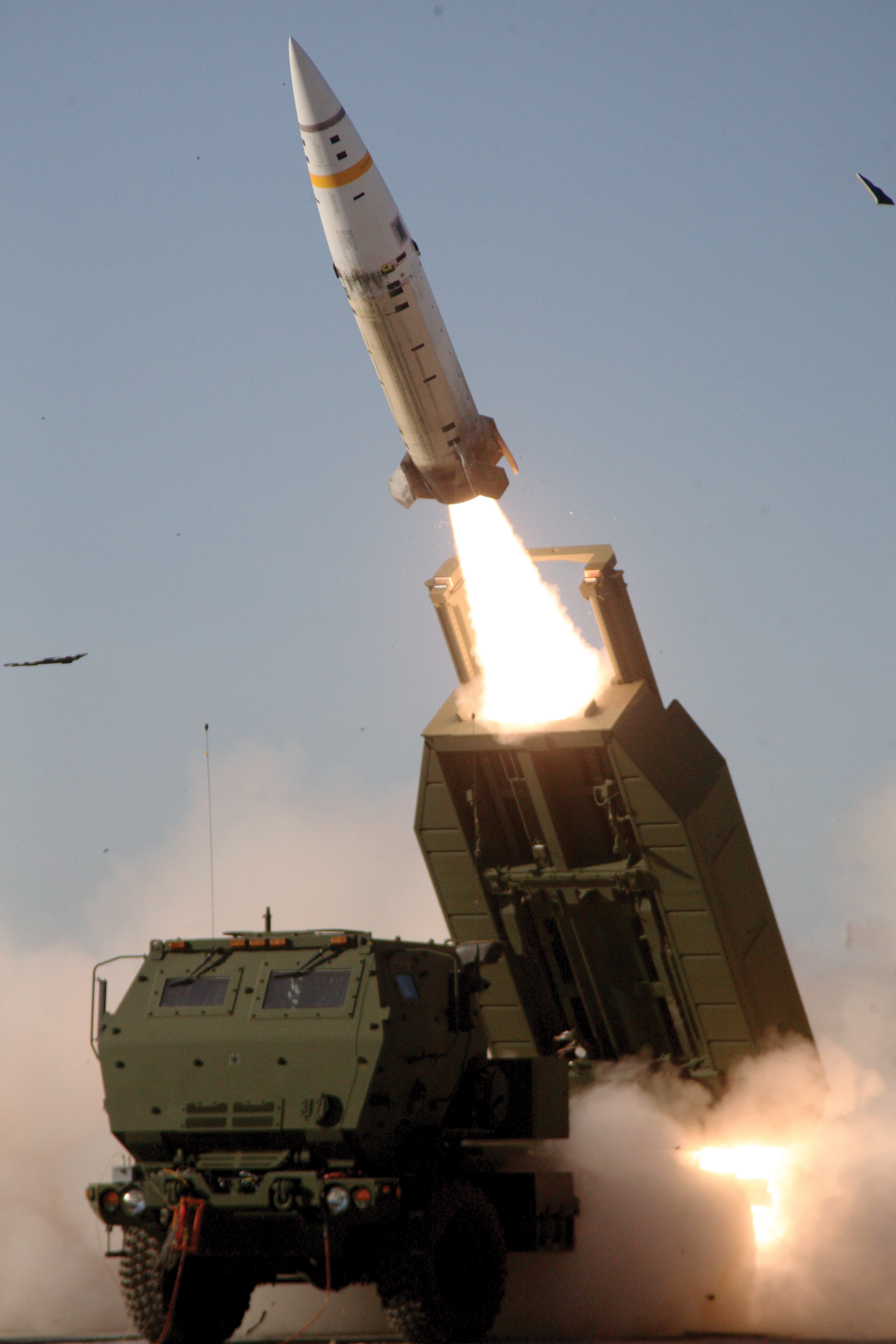
- ATACMS launch by HIMARS
- Type: Rocket artillery Tactical ballistic missile
- Place of origin: United States

Service history
- In service: 1991–present
- Used by: Australia; United States; South Korea; Morocco; Romania; Greece; Turkey; Poland; Ukraine; United Arab Emirates
- Wars: Gulf War; Iraq War; Russo-Ukrainian War; 2026 Iran war

Production history
- Designer: Ling-Temco-Vought
- Designed: 1986
- Manufacturer: Lockheed Martin
- Unit cost: M39: $820,000 (FY1998) (or ~$1,476,000 FY2022); M57: ~$1,700,000 (FY2021)
- No. built: 3,700

Specifications
- Mass: 3,690 pounds (1,670 kg)
- Length: 13 feet (4.0 m)
- Diameter: 24 inches (610 mm)
- Wingspan: 55 inches (1.4 m)
- Maximum firing range: 190 mi (300 km)
- Warhead: Block 1: 950 M74 bomblets Block 1A: 300 M74 bomblets or 470 lb (213 kg) WDU-18/B HE blast/fragmentation unitary warhead or 545 lb (247 kg) WDU-40/B HE blast penetration Block 2: 13 BAT submunitions
- Flight ceiling: 160,000 ft (50 km)
- Maximum speed: Supersonic, in excess of Mach 3 (0.6 mi/s; 1.0 km/s)
- Guidance system: GPS-aided inertial navigation guidance
- Launch platform: M270, HIMARS, GMARS

The MGM-140 Army Tactical Missile System (ATACMS /əˈtækəmz/) is an American short-range tactical ballistic missile. It is launched from the M270 Multiple Launch Rocket System (MLRS), the M142 High Mobility Artillery Rocket System (HIMARS), and the GMARS. Depending on the variant, it has a maximum range of up to 190 miles (300 km).

ATACMS originated in the Joint Tactical Missile System (JTACMS) program, which began in 1980 to replace the MGM-52 Lance. After the United States Air Force withdrew from the program in 1984, the missile was redesignated the Army Tactical Missile System and its development continued under the U.S. Army. Ling-Temco-Vought (LTV) later won the missile design contract, and ATACMS entered service in 1991, before evolving through several variants with different guidance systems, warheads, and ranges.

ATACMS has been used in combat in the Gulf War, the Iraq War, the Russo-Ukrainian War, and the 2026 Iran war. It has undergone modernization through the ATACMS Service Life Extension Program (SLEP) and is being replaced in U.S. service by the Precision Strike Missile (PrSM).

== History ==
=== Pre-development ===
The concept of a conventional tactical ballistic missile was made possible by the doctrinal shift of the late Cold War, which rejected the indispensability of an early nuclear strike on the Warsaw Pact forces in the event the Cold War went hot. The AirLand Battle and Follow-on Forces Attack doctrines, which emerged in the late 1970s and early 1980s, necessitated a conventional-armed (hence much more accurate) missile to strike enemy reserves, so the United States Army Aviation and Missile Command sponsored the Simplified Inertial Guidance Demonstrator (SIG-D) program.

Within this program, Ling-Temco-Vought developed a solid-fuel analog of the MGM-52 Lance missile, designated T-22, with a new RLG-based inertial guidance package, which demonstrated unprecedented accuracy. In 1978, DARPA started the Assault Breaker technology demonstration program to attack armor formations with many mobile hard targets at standoff ranges. It used the T-22 missile and the Patriot-based Martin Marietta T-16 missile with cluster warheads.

In March 1980 the US Army decided to replace the Lance with a similar nuclear-tipped solid-fuel missile with simplified usability dubbed the Corps Support Weapon System (CSWS). In a year, concerned about the fact Army started to develop the weapon with a similar objectives to interdict the second-echelon massed targets to already developing by USAF's Conventional Standoff Weapon (CSW) program with only difference of surface/air-launched and both positioned as the part of same Short Range Nuclear Forces of Non-Strategic Nuclear Force Program, the Department of Defense subdued CSWS Project Office (Provisional) to MICOM renaming it to the System Development Office. That new office acquired the Assault Breaker effort thus started to manage the Assault Breaker and CSWS efforts together, that way slowly summing up and moving forward the weapon development progress for the JTACMS program to be created.

=== Development ===
Development of the missile now known as ATACMS started in 1980, when the US Army decided to replace the Lance with a similar nuclear, but also chemical or biological, tipped solid-fuel missile dubbed the Corps Support Weapon System (CSWS). Concerned that two branches were developing too many similar missiles with different warheads, the Department of Defense merged the program with DARPA's Assault Breaker in 1981, and with United States Air Force (USAF)'s Conventional Standoff Weapon (CSW) in 1982–1983.

The new missile system, designated Joint Tactical Missile System (JTACMS), soon encountered USAF resistance to the idea of an air-launched ballistic missile. As a result, in 1984 the USAF ended its participation in the non-cruise missile portion of the program, leading to the missile being redesignated as the Army Tactical Missile System (ATACMS).

==== Details ====
In fiscal year 1982, the United States House Committee on Appropriations approved the Corps Support Weapon System (CSWS) program, which was the successor to the US Army Assault Breaker program in cooperation with DARPA, was merged with the Conventional Standoff Weapon (CSW) US Air Force and renamed the Joint Tactical Missile System (JTACMS), the goal of which was to create a weapon that meets the combined requirements of both programs, namely, that it can attack and destroy the second-echelon of enemy forces, in particular armored vehicles, and scatter submunitions against such vehicles. In this project, it was planned to use the technologies of Assault Breaker to develop a surface-to-surface weapon system, which should be used for the so-called "deep interdiction" (some sort of preventive measure, the prototype of which is air interdiction used by air force) – by which is meant the destruction or causing significant damage by the joint activity of air and ground forces to the specific distant from the front line targets, such as buildings, bridges, oil refineries and other industry, that way slowing down logistics or providing or supporting and, therefore, advancing enemy troops with the aim of tactical, even albeit short-term, superiority of allied troops, which can significantly affect the military theater in a positive way, – using conventional or nuclear weapons on the battlefield. Although both services were to participate in the development of the weapon, it was the US Army who led the JTACMS program.

The program was initially led by Colonel James B. Lincoln, who was a full-time and continuous student at numerous military schools (from 1960, when he graduated from the United States Military Academy, until 1980, when he graduated from the Industrial College of the Armed Forces), in 1977 on the basis of Defense Systems Management College graduated with a thesis of "Managing Total Acquisition Time: A New Priority for Major Weapon Systems", where, in particular, he focused on the significant decrease in the pace of procurement of the main missile complexes compared to 1971 and in 1980, heading the TRADOC program at Fort Sill in the direction of MLRS, spoke rather defiantly about field army systems, where, in particular, he compared the struggle of the US Army for limited resources during the development of new systems with bow wave, which prevents the ship from accelerating, and military projects are either canceled or refinanced by the state, with waves diverging from it, and was noticed by DARCOM. In April 1984, he was transferred to be the head of the TOW project, and in the current project he was replaced by Colonel William J. Fiorentino, who by that time had already been the head of the Pershing Project Manager's Office for more than 5 years, which during his leadership developed two-stage solid fuel mobile-launched ballistic missiles with a nuclear warhead both short (Pershing) and medium (Pershing II) ranged. Dr. Billy Tidwell who was program manager during JTACMS while and Acting Program Manager for a short period.

In FY 1984 Congress prohibited the development of a nuclear warhead for JTACMS, despite the Army claiming it could place US forces at a disadvantage if it became necessary to make the system nuclear-capable. In FY 1985 the Army denied having R&D funds programmed for the development of a JTACMS nuclear warhead.

On May, 22nd, 1984 the US Army and USAF signed an agreeing on a list of 31 initiatives. Item 18 on that list states about services will develop a different types of same rocket for each of it – preferences for Army was a development of shorter-ranged ground-launched system, for air-force – air-launched system.

JTACMS was intended to be a jointly funded program with NATO allies; the United Kingdom, Federal Republic of Germany, Belgium, the Netherlands and Italy were initially contacted about joining the program, with the British and Germans expressing interest, while the others declined due to lacking adequate funds.

Starting from at least the end of year 1986, the ATACMS program was led by Colonel Thomas J. Kunhart.

=== Production ===
M57 missile containers, the ATACMS pod mimics a standard 6-pack MLRS pod

In March 1986, Ling-Temco-Vought won the contract for the missile design. The system was assigned the MGM-140 designation. The first test launch came two years later, thanks to earlier experience of the company with previous programs.

In 2007, the US Army terminated the ATACMS program due to cost, ending the ability to replenish stocks. To sustain the remaining inventory, the ATACMS Service Life Extension Program (SLEP) was launched, which refurbishes or replaces propulsion and navigation systems, replaces cluster munition warheads with the unitary blast fragmentation warhead, and adds a proximity fuze option to obtain area effects. Deliveries were projected to start in 2018. The ATACMS SLEP is a bridging initiative to provide time to complete analysis and development of a successor capability to the aging ATACMS stockpile, which could be ready around 2022.

The National Defense Authorization Act for Fiscal Year 2023 authorized the production and procurement of up to 1,700 additional ATACMS, but this was not funded by the 2023 Defense Appropriations Act.

Whilst domestic orders remain zero, in recent times Lockheed Martin has enjoyed great success on the export market securing a 440 million dollars worth of orders for various international customers, including Taiwan, Poland and Germany. These missiles are being produced at a new industrial site in Camden, Ark, as well as a new facility run by Rheinmetall in Unterluess, Germany, which will produce the ATACAMS under licence. Deliveries from the Camden site began in 2024 with the Rheinmetall site to begin production at a later date.

=== Stockpile upgrades ===
In January 2015, Lockheed Martin received a contract to develop and test new hardware for Block I ATACMS missiles to eliminate the risk of unexploded ordnance by 2016. The first modernized Tactical Missile System (TACMS) was delivered in September 2016 with updated guidance electronics and added capability to defeat area targets using a unitary warhead, without leaving behind unexploded ordnance. Lockheed was awarded a production contract for launch assemblies as part of the SLEP in August 2017. In 2021, Lockheed Martin was contracted to upgrade existing M39 munitions to the M57 variant with a WDU-18/B warhead from the Harpoon missile by 2024.

A plan announced in October 2016 to add an existing seeker to enable the ATACMS to strike moving targets on land and at sea was terminated in December 2020 to pursue other missile efforts.

=== Replacement ===
Starting in 2016, the Long-Range Precision Fires (LRPF) program began to be developed, which was later renamed Precision Strike Missile (PrSM), with the idea of replacing ATACMS missiles with the "Increment 1" phase (version) of PrSM. PrSM Increment 1 missiles began delivery in late 2023.

== Versions ==
Specifications
	M39 Block I	M39A1 Block I	M48 QRU	M57 Block IA Unitary
Mass	3,675 lb (1,667 kg)	2,906 lb (1,318 kg) (est)	Unknown	Unknown
Length	13 ft 0.5 in (3.975 m)			
Diameter	24 in (610 mm)			
Guidance type	INS	GPS aided INS		
Warhead	950 x M74 bomblets (Note: The M74 APAM (Anti‐Personnel Anti‐Matériel) bomblet weighs 21 oz (590 g) and is 2.32 in (58.9 mm) in diameter. It has a Composition B High‐Explosive shaped charge. It is initiated by an M219A1E1 fuze with a booster pellet which also creates an incendiary effect, and is surrounded by a tungsten fragmenting wall.)	300 x M74 bomblets	WAU-23/B unitary warhead	
Warhead weight	1,303 lb (591 kg)	384 lb (174 kg)	472 lb (214 kg)	
Fuze	M74 APAM bomblets each initiated by an M219A1E1 fuze		FMU 141/B point detonating fuze	Tri-mode (point detonating, proximity, and delay) fuze
Motor	Solid-propellant rocket motor			
Max speed	Mach 3 (1,000 m/s; 3,300 ft/s)	Unknown	Unknown	Unknown
Min range	16 mi (25 km)	43 mi (70 km)		
Max range	103 mi (165 km)	190 mi (300 km)	170 mi (270 km)	190 mi (300 km)

- M39 (Block I) – missile with inertial guidance. It carries 950 M74 anti-personnel and anti‑materiel (APAM) bomblets, each about the size of a baseball and weighing 1.3 lb (0.59 kg), which are dispersed across a circular area approximately 677 feet (206 m) in diameter, and effective against parked aircraft, ammunition dumps, air defense systems, and gatherings of personnel, but not against armored vehicles. The size of the affected area can be changed by modifying the height at which the payload is released. The range of Block I is 16 to 100 mi (25 to 165 km). The M74 has a reported failure rate of 2%.
- M39A1 (Block IA) – missile with GPS-aided guidance. It carries 300 M74 bomblets. There were 610 produced between 1997 and 2003. During Operation Iraqi Freedom, 74 were expended. As of 2021, the remaining ones were being updated to M57E1 standard. The range is 12–190 miles (20–300 km).
- M39A2 (Block II) missile used to dispense Brilliant Anti-armour Technology (BAT) submunitions. Has the same INS/GPS guidance system as the M39A1 and carries 13 BAT submunitions in the enlarged warhead section.
- M48 (Block I/Block 1 Unitary) is a variant of ATACMS Block IA, containing the Quick Reaction Unitary (QRU) warhead. It carries the 500-pound (230 kg) WDU-18/B penetrating high explosive blast fragmentation warhead of the Harpoon anti-ship missile, which was packaged into the newly designed WAU-23/B warhead section. There were 176 produced between 2001 and 2004, when production ceased in favor of the M57. Operational since 2002. During Operation Iraqi Freedom, 16 were launched, and a further 42 during Operation Enduring Freedom. The remaining ones are in the US Army and US Marine Corps' arsenal. Range: 43–190 mi (70–300 km).
- M57 (Block IA/Block 1A Quick Reaction Unitary, TACMS 2000 or T2K) – is, in fact, same missile as M48, with production costs reduced by up to $100,000 per missile via the "TACMS 2000" program. M39A1-based upgraded missile with GPS-aided guidance. It carries the same WAU-23/B warhead section as the M48. There were 513 produced between 2004 and 2013. Accuracy is 30 ft (9 m) CEP (Circular Error Probable). Range: 43 to 190 mi (70 to 300 km).
- M57E1 (ATACMS MOD or MOD [modification, modified]) – upgraded M39 and M39A1 with re-grained motor, updated navigation and guidance software and hardware, and a WAU-23/B warhead section instead of the M74 bomblets. This variant includes a proximity sensor for airburst detonation. Production commenced in 2017 with an initial order for 220.
- NATACMS – a ship-launched ATACMS variant for the US Navy, was under development in the 1990s and was tested twice in early 1995: first from the ground at the White Sands Missile Range, and then from the flight deck of USS Mount Vernon (LSD-39) using a modified Army M270 tracked vehicle at a target 75 nautical miles (86 mi) distant on San Clemente Island off Southern California. The last testing missile carried 730 Mk 74 (probably meaning M74 munition) submunitions. Despite all test objectives being met, or even exceeded, development was later cancelled for unknown reasons.
- SLATACMS – a projected Sea-Launched ATACMS variant of the Army Block IA missile for undersea operations with a maximum launch depth limit of 175 feet (53 m), identical warhead, same diameter and only dimensional changes of length from 156.5 to 199 inches (3.98 to 5.05 m), for fins to be folded within a smaller envelope and the addition of a fin module, which had to be jettisoned after broach and before motor ignition, behind the boattail for stability during underwater flight, – to fit primarily within the most advanced (688i, FLTIII/Flight III) design of Los Angeles-class submarine vertical launching system (VLS) capsules, having 12 of such ones on board. Its history began when USN Strategic System Program Office authorized a study in June 1995 to evaluate undersea cold launch capability of MGM-140A from submarines. However, on the Hearings on National Defense Authorization Act for Fiscal Year 1997 held on March, 1996, become known that USN plan to use not only APAM but also a BAT (Brilliant Anti-Tank) munitions payload, and when Lockheed Martin presented SLATACMS press-release at August, 1996, there was already described Block IA missile as a base modification specimen for the SLATACMS. Choosing a submarine VLS as the appropriate launcher, that was designed by default for Tomahawk missile, which have about 1.5 times the length of SLATACMS, exclusively, had led to the creation of a unique combined missile and launch capsule as an all-up-round (AUR) or SLATACMS AUR, which with SLATACMS inside fits the submarine's Tomahawk-designed VLS.

== Operation ==
The ATACMS was first used in combat in 1991: 32 were fired from the M270 MLRS during Operation Desert Storm. In 2003, more than 450 were fired in Operation Iraqi Freedom. By early 2015, more than 560 ATACMS missiles had been used in combat.

=== During the Russo-Ukrainian war (2022–present) ===
Starting from October 2023 Ukraine began using the earliest (short-ranged) versions of ATACMS during the Russo-Ukrainian war. These missiles were meant to threaten the Russian-occupied "land corridor" to Crimea in the southern part of Ukraine as well as the vast majority of the Russian-operated air bases in the north of Crimea, which would theoretically complicate Russia's use of attack helicopters from those bases against Ukrainian targets. The first recorded Ukrainian ATACMS strikes destroyed numerous Russian Military helicopters on the ground, confirmed by satellite imagery and video from the ground.

Starting from 19 February 2024 there were rumors about possible near-future use of later (longer-ranged) versions of ATACMS by Ukraine, which were shortly proven correct when an ATACMS missile attack on the Russian-occupied Dzhankoi air base resulted in six main explosions and several reported secondary explosions. The base was positioned much further than earlier versions of ATACMS' strike range from Ukraine-controlled territory. It was then officially confirmed when US officials revealed Ukraine had already received and deployed the missiles to a combat-ready status a month prior. These strikes with longer-range ATACMS deeper into Crimea destroyed components of Russian air defense systems, such as launchers part of the S-300 or S-400, along with destroying Russian Military aircraft on the ground, such as two MiG-31 interceptors, confirmed by satellite and ground imagery.

ATACMS has shown an ability to destroy air defense sites, and was used to destroy an active Russian S-300 or S-400 site. Drone footage showed the air defense system launching interceptors before the cluster submunitions of ATACMS impacted, causing numerous detonations of air defense system components such as launchers.

On 23 June an incident occurred during an attack on Sevastopol, where Russian air defense missiles were fired at multiple ATACMS missiles resulting in explosions that caused 4 deaths and more than 150 injuries on Uchkuyivka beach, where locals reported that no air raid warning had taken place and therefore people on the beach were not able to evacuate.

In September Russian President Vladimir Putin threatened retaliation for attacks on Russian territory. Experts said Putin's threats are aimed at dissuading the United States, the United Kingdom and France from allowing Ukraine to use Western-supplied long-range missiles such as the Storm Shadow and ATACMS in strikes against Russia.

On 17 November the United States changed policy, allowing Ukraine to use ATACMS for military targets inside mainland Russia. On 19 November, ATACMS were for the first time fired at a target within the internationally recognized borders of Russia. An ammunition storage facility was destroyed in the Bryansk region of Russia, with videos of explosions and fires on the ground at the site emerging. On 25 November, ATACMS were used to hit a Russian S-400 air defense system at an airbase in the Kursk region of Russia. Video emerged of ATACMS cluster munitions hitting the airbase, and imagery emerged of a destroyed 92N6E radar station of the S-400 system.

On 24 February 2026, ATACMS were fired by Ukraine on a Russian 5th Army “auxiliary command” near Novopetrykivka in Donetsk Oblast.

==== EW vs usability ====
The ATACMS uses multiple inertial navigation units knitted together with software, so it is reportedly able to maintain accuracy when GPS is lost due to electronic warfare better than other GPS-guided weapons.

==== Reverse engineering ====
On 1 July 2024, Russia claimed to have recovered an ATACMS missile guidance system intact, and stated that Russian officials are studying the guidance system to "identify any weak spots".

=== During the 2026 Iran war ===
The ATACMS was used in combat in the 2026 Iran war. The US Army reportedly expended almost all of its ATACMS inventory during the first five months of the conflict. It fired more than 1,300 of the Army's tactical ballistic missiles in the initial weeks of fighting.

== Operators ==
Operators: Current Future

- Australia: In May 2022, the US DSCA approved a sale to Australia of 20 M142 HIMARS launchers for the Australian Army with 10 M57 ATACMS unitary rockets and other MLRS munitions in a US$385 million contract. In August 2023, the DSCA approved a sale of an additional 22 M142 HIMARS and related equipment for an estimated cost of US$975 million. On 19 August 2023, the Australian Government announced the purchase of more M142 HIMARS bringing the total number to 42 and also an order for associated munitions.
- Bahrain: The Royal Bahraini Army purchased 30 M39-series ATACMS in 2000 and 110 M57 ATACMS in 2018.
- Estonia: A request to buy up to 18 M57 ATACMS was approved in July 2022. All were delivered by 2025.
- Greece: The Hellenic Army operates the 103 mi (165 km) variant.
- South Korea: In 2002, the South Korean Army purchased 111 ATACMS Block I and 111 ATACMS Block IA missiles for the M270 MLRS.
- Romania: The Romanian Land Forces purchased 54 M57 ATACMS, which were all delivered by June 2022.
- Poland: The Polish Land Forces purchased 30 M57 ATACMS, which were all delivered by June 2022. Another 45 M57 ATACMS were ordered in February 2023.
- Turkey: The Turkish Army uses the ATACMS Block IA.
- Qatar: The Qatari Emiri Land Force acquired 60 M57 ATACMS in 2012.
- United Arab Emirates: The United Arab Emirates Army acquired 100 M57 ATACMS in 2014.
- United States: The United States Army and United States Marine Corps are both ATACMS operators.
- Ukraine: The Armed Forces of Ukraine operates ATACMS M39 Block I; these were used in combat for the first time on 17 October 2023. The longer range ATACMS with bomblets and unitary warheads were also reportedly supplied and used starting in March 2024. Ukraine fired several American-supplied longer-range missiles ATACMS into Russia, Ukrainian officials said on 18 November 2024, marking the first time Kyiv used the weapons that way in 1,000 days of war.
- Taiwan: In October 2020, the US State Department approved the sale of 64 M57 ATACMS to Taiwan. On the 10th of November 2024, Taiwan received its 1st batch of ATACMS missile systems from the US.

=== Future operators ===
- Canada: A request to buy 64 M57 ATACMS missile pods was approved in October 2025.
- Latvia: A request to buy 10 M57 ATACMS missile pods was approved in October 2023.
- Lithuania: A request to buy 18 M57 ATACMS missile pods was approved in November 2022.
- Morocco: Ordered 18 M142 HIMARS launchers with 40 M57 ATACMS missile pods along with other MLRS munitions (M30A2, M31A2) for an estimated cost of US$524 million in April 2023.

=== Failed bids ===
- Finland: A Finnish contract for 70 missiles was canceled due to high prices in March 2014.
- Netherlands: A request to buy 80 M57 ATACMS pods was approved in February 2023. In May 2023 the Royal Netherlands Army purchased 20 PULS rocket artillery systems made by Israel's Elbit Systems instead.
- Norway: A request to buy 16 M142 HIMARS launchers and 100 M57 ATACMS pods was approved in August 2024. In January 2026 the decision was made to order South Korean K239 Chunmoo launchers with associated missiles instead.

== See also ==
- United States Army Aviation and Missile Command

=== Comparable missiles ===
- Hatf-I – (Pakistan)
- OTR-21 Tochka – (Soviet Union)
- 9K720 Iskander – (Russia)
- Hwasong-11B – (North Korea)
- Hyunmoo-2 – (South Korea)
- P-12 – (China)
- Prahaar – (India)
- LORA – (Israel)
- Bora – (Turkey)
- Fateh-313 – (Iran)
- KTSSM – (South Korea)
- Hrim-2 – (Ukraine)
- Predator Hawk – (Israel)
