= K239 Chunmoo =

South Korean long-range multiple launch rocket system

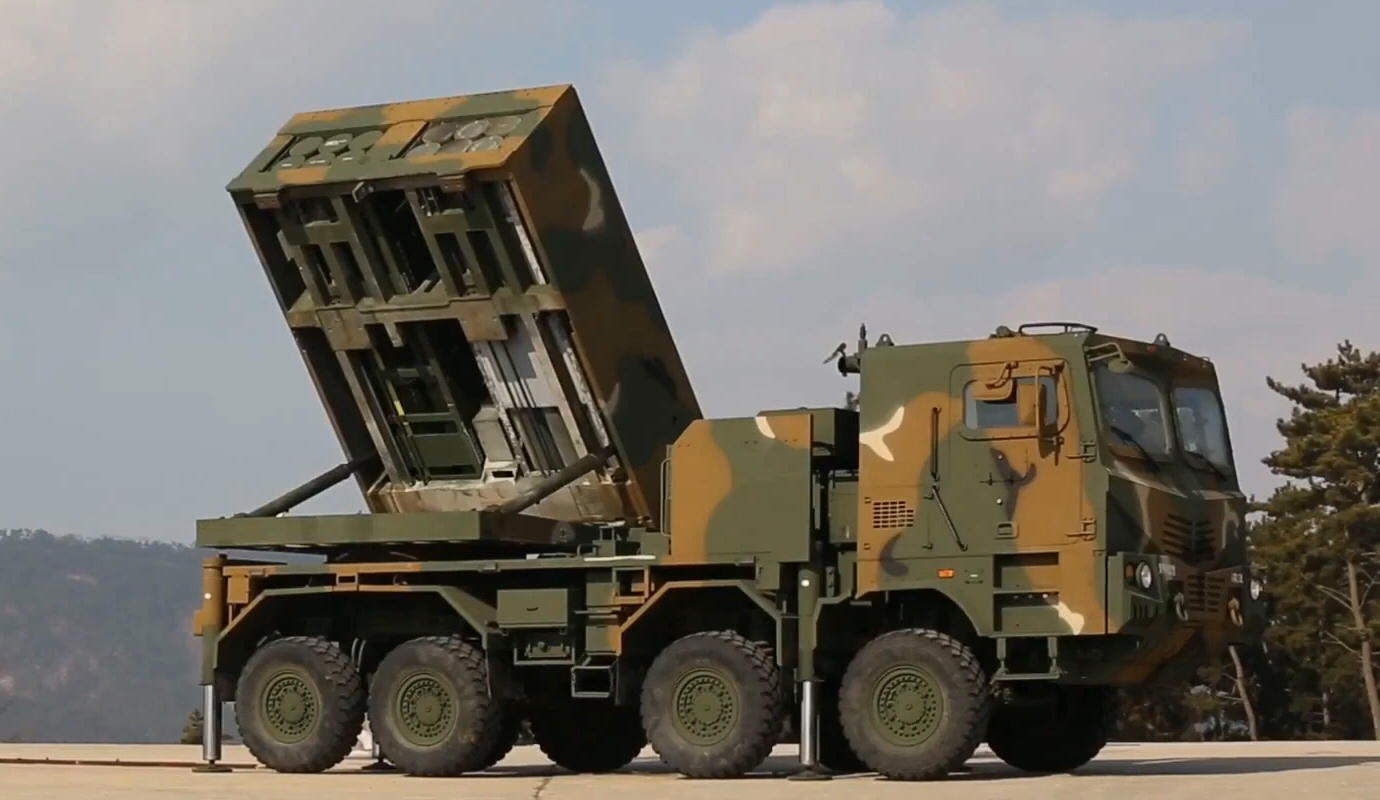
- K239L Chunmoo vehicle
- Type: Multiple rocket launcher Tactical ballistic missile
- Place of origin: South Korea

Service history
- In service: 2015–present
- Used by: See Operators

Production history
- Designer: Agency for Defense Development (launcher); Doosan DST (vehicle); Hanwha (rocket); Samyang Comtech (armor)
- Designed: 2009–2013
- Manufacturer: Hanwha Aerospace (2015–present); Korea Defense Industry (2020–present); Huta Stalowa Wola (2023–present)
- Unit cost: ₩3.6 billion (US$2.94 million) per one launcher+K239L vehicle (2020)
- Produced: 2014–present
- No. built: 356/705
- Variants: Homar-K

Specifications
- Mass: 31 metric tons (31 long tons; 34 short tons)
- Length: 9 meters (29 ft 6 in)
- Width: 2.9 meters (9 ft 6 in)
- Height: 3.3 meters (10 ft 10 in)
- Crew: 3 (K239L launcher vehicle); 2 (K239T ammunition support vehicle)
- Caliber: 131 mm (K33); 230 mm (KM26A2); 239 mm (CGR-080); 280 mm (CTM-MR/ASBM); 600 mm (CTM-290)
- Rate of fire: 6 rds/in 30 sec (CGR-080)
- Effective firing range: 36 km (K33); 45 km (KM26A2); 80 km (CGR-080); 160 km (CTM-MR/ASBM); 290 km (CTM-290)
- Armor: Samyang Comtech Steel / Ceramic + Polymer Matrix Composites (STANAG 4569 Level 2)
- Main armament: 20×2 K33; 6×2 KM26A2; 6×2 CGR-080; 4×2 CTM-MR/ASBM; 1×2 CTM-290
- Engine: HD Hyundai Infracore DV11K 6-cylinder water-cooled diesel engine 450 hp (340 kW)
- Power/weight: 14.5 hp/t (10.81 kW/t)
- Transmission: Allison Transmission 4500SP
- Fuel capacity: 250 liters (66 U.S. gal)
- Operational range: 450 km (280 mi)
- Maximum speed: 80 km/h (50 mph)
- Guidance system: GPS-aided INS
- Accuracy: 9 m CEP (CTM-290); 15 m CEP (CGR-080)

The K239 Chunmoo (Note: The name Chunmoo (天橆) means to cover the sky. The name was given because the smoke from the rocket covered the sky when 20 131 mm rockets were launched in a row.) (Korean: 천무; Hanja: 天橆; RR: Cheon-mu) is a rocket artillery system developed in 2013 to replace the aging K136 Kooryong of the South Korean military.

== History ==
A K239 MLRS battery is launching a K33 131 mm rocket into the sea.

South Korea struggled to come up with countermeasures in the 1970s when North Korea deployed BM-21 Grad, a new multiple rocket launcher (MRL) brought in from the Soviet Union. At that time, the possibility of fatal casualties increased if towed howitzers, self-propelled howitzers, and multiple rocket launchers deployed by the North Korean military fired at South Korea. The South Korean military developed the K136 Kooryong in 1978 to counter the threat of North Korean artillery. With the deployment of Kooryong to the Republic of Korea Army (ROK Army) since the 1980s, it was temporarily able to maintain a similar balance to North Korea's artillery power.

However, over time, problems such as the discontinuation of the main parts of the aging Kooryong system have been revealed, and as North Korea developed a large-caliber rocket with further increased range, the military pointed out that Kooryong could be outmatched.

Development of the K239 Chunmoo began in 2009 and was completed in late 2013. South Korea's Defense Acquisition Program Administration (DAPA) spent 131.4 billion won ($112.4 million) on the project to create a replacement for the K136 Kooryong MLRS. The goal was to develop a new multiple rocket launcher system with an automated fire control system compatible with the ammunition used in the M270 MLRS, which the South Korean military had previously operated. Initial production was carried out in August 2014. The K239 development program was the first defense development program led by South Korean private defense companies, unlike other defense development programs conducted under the leadership of the Agency for Defense Development (ADD).

In August 2015, the ROK Army began deploying Chunmoo batteries, and by the end of 2016, it was deployed to Yeonpyeong Island and Baengnyeong Island, where ROK Marine Corps are stationed.

In October 2025 at ADEX 2025 in Seoul, Hanwha Aerospace unveiled the High-Performance Multiple Rocket Launcher (HPMRL). Developed for Marine Corps usage as a more mobile launcher than the K239 Chunmoo, the HPMRL prototype weighs 19 tons and is 8.5 meters long, 2.6 meters wide, and 3.2 meters high. Its smaller size means that HPMRL only carry a single ammunition pod of the type used by Chunmoo. However, HPMRL is capable of being transported by C-130 aircraft without disassembly and can fire from the deck of a moving ship in Sea State 5. With initial development of HPMRL as an internal Hanwha program being complete, full-scale development in cooperation with DAPA is expected to start in 2030.

== Design ==
The K239 MLRS is launching a CGR-080 239 mm guided rocket.

The K239 Chunmoo is a self-propelled multiple launch rocket system (MLRS) capable of firing several different guided or unguided artillery rockets.

The K239 is capable of launching K33 131 mm rockets, but not 130 mm rockets (such as the K30, K37 and K38), which are used in the existing K136 Kooryong rocket artillery system. The K239 launcher carries two launch pods, each of which can hold three types of loadouts:

- 20 K33 131 mm unguided rockets, previously used on the K136 Kooryong, with a range of 36 kilometers (22 mi) (40 total).
- Six KM26A2 230 mm rockets which are based on the M26 227 mm unguided DPICM rocket used in M270 MLRS vehicles operated by the South Korean Army, with a range of 45 kilometers (28 mi) (12 total).
- Six 239 mm chunmoo guided rockets (CGR-080) with either high explosive penetration warheads, or cluster bombs with 300 bomblets, designed for the K239 Chunmoo with a range of 80 kilometers (50 mi) (12 total).

The CGR-080 239 mm rockets are 3.96 meters (13.0 ft) long and GPS-aided INS guided, and the rocket is designed to be equipped with two types of warheads, a high explosive warhead developed as a bunker buster, or a cluster bomb warhead, with hundreds of bomblets, for use against personnel in a wide area. The high explosive warhead bursts on impact for use against personnel and bursts after a delay to destroy bunkers; it was a requirement of the ROK Army for the guided rocket to have a penetrator warhead to be used as a bunker buster solution against the large number of bunkers along the DMZ. A guided rocket containing cluster bombs is capable of extensive artillery fire on a specific area of three times the area of a soccer field.

Two different types of rocket pods can be loaded at once. The rocket pod can launch six 239 mm rockets in 30 seconds and a total of 12 rockets in one minute, and it's possible to reload two rocket pods in seven minutes. The launch vehicle is based on a Doosan DST (now Hanwha Defense) K239L 8×8 truck chassis with an armored cab that protects its 3-man crew from small arms fire and artillery shell splinters as well as providing NBC protection. The vehicle can climb 60% slopes (20 degrees), and is equipped with an Anti-lock Braking System (ABS), Run-flat tires, and a Central Tire Inflation System (CTIS). Each Chunmoo launcher is paired with an K239T Ammunition Support Vehicle (ASV) which uses the same type of truck chassis and carries four reload pods. An ROK Army Chunmoo battery consists of 18 vehicles and uses a K200A1 as a command vehicle.

=== Modular tactical vehicles ===
U.S. Marines with 5th Air Naval Gunfire Liaison Company, III Marine Expeditionary Force Information Group, observe ROK Marines demonstrating the K239L launcher vehicle during exercise Freedom Shield 2026

Service members of the ROK Marine 6th Brigade are displaying the K239T's ammunition pod loading function

The K239 Chunmoo system was created from the ground up to have distinguishing characteristics from other multiple launch rocket systems.

- In order to reduce operational and maintenance costs, the Chunmoo launcher system is mounted on the modified chassis of a four-axle Korean truck which has less cross-country ability when compared to tracked vehicles.
- The artillery unit does not have permanently mounted launch rails. This allows the Chunmoo to transport and use launch containers containing different types of rockets from one platform.
- The cockpit of the vehicle is armoured to provides protection against small-calibre weapons and artillery shell fragments.
- It is equipped with a load-lifting device, similar to that of the MLRS. The estimated maximum recharging time is 10 minutes.
- The Chunmoo system includes an ammunition transport and charging vehicle on a common 8x8 chassis, and carries two sets of transport and discharge containers.
- The Korean army requested that the Chunmoo be designed to fire different types of ammunition. This includes 227 mm standard MLRS, but also 131 mm and 239 mm South Korean rockets. The maximum range of the 131 mm ammunition is up to 36 kilometers (22 mi) and approximately 80 kilometers (50 mi) for the 239 mm ammunition.
- Rockets can be fired from the cockpit of the combat vehicle, or by using a remote fire control device.
- The Chunmoo system is capable of being transported by the C-130 but requires the removal of its tires and wheels to fit inside the aircraft's hold.

==== Vehicle specifications ====
		K239L Launcher Vehicle	K239T Ammunition Support Vehicle
Weight	Curb weight	15 metric tons (15 long tons; 17 short tons)	
Weight	Combat weight	31 metric tons (31 long tons; 34 short tons)	
Length		9,056 mm (29.711 ft)	
Width		2,900 mm (9.5 ft)	
Height		3,318 mm (10.886 ft)	3,500 mm (11.5 ft)
Crew		3 (Launcher chief, Assistant chief, Gunner)	2 (Driver, Loader)
Payload		5 metric tons (2 pods)	10 metric tons (4 pods)
Engine power		450 hp (340 kW)	
Maximum speed		80 km/h (50 mph)	
Cruising range		450 km (280 mi)	

=== Rocket and missile specifications ===
Model	Type	Diameter	Guidance type	Warhead	Propulsion	Range	Accuracy (CEP)	Ammunition	Notes
K33	Surface-to-surface rocket	131 mm (5.2 in)	Unguided	High explosive	Solid fuel propellant	36 km (22 mi)	Unknown	20 × K33 per pod	Previously used as the extended range rocket of the K136.
KM26A2	Surface-to-surface rocket	230 mm (9.1 in)	Unguided	M77 DPICM (cluster munition)	Solid fuel propellant	45 km (28 mi)	Unknown	20 × KM26A2 per pod	Korean-made under licence M26A2 rocket (from the USA)
CGR-080	Surface-to-surface rocket	239 mm (9.4 in)	GPS / INS	High explosive / penetration fragmentation	Solid fuel propellant (composite propellant)	30 to 80 km (19 to 50 mi)	15 m (16 yd)	6 × CGR-080 per pod	Part of the Chunmoo 1.0 armament program. Intention: a guided rocket with a HE warhead or cluster bombs.
CTM-290	Tactical ballistic missile	600 mm (24 in)	GPS / INS	High explosive / blast fragmentation	Solid fuel propellant (composite propellant)	80 to 290 km (50 to 180 mi)	9 m (9.8 yd)	1 × CTM-290 per pod	Part of the Chunmoo 1.0 armament program. variant of the Ure tactical ballistic missile (block 2).
CTM-MR	Surface-to-surface missile	280 mm (11 in)	GPS / INS	High explosive / blast fragmentation	Solid fuel propellant (composite propellant)	50 to 160 km (31 to 99 mi)	9 m (9.8 yd)	4 × CTM-MR per pod	Part of the Chunmoo 1.0 armament program.
CTM-ASBM	Anti-ship ballistic missile	280 mm (11 in)	Dual-guidance mode: GPS / INS / IIR	High explosive / blast fragmentation	Solid fuel propellant (composite propellant)	50 to 160 km (31 to 99 mi)	80 % (hit probability)	4 × CTM-ASBM per pod	Part of the Chunmoo 2.0 armament program. Missile based on the CTM-MR, modified to by an anti-ship ballistic missile for coastline defense operations.
CTM-500 (CTM-X)	Tactical ballistic missile	600 mm (24 in)	GPS / INS	High explosive / blast fragmentation	Solid fuel propellant (composite propellant)	250 to 500 km (160 to 310 mi)	Unknown	1 × CTM-500 per pod	Part of the Chunmoo 3.0 armament program. Weapon based on the CTM-290, with a longer length / range.
L-PGW 100	Loitering munition	–	EO / IR (Deep learning algorithm for target recognition)	Unknown	Unknown	80 to 100 km (50 to 62 mi)	Unknown	6 × L-PGW 100 per pod	Part of the Chunmoo 3.0 armament program. The loitering munition can be mounted on the CGR-080 rocket.
L-PGW 300	Loitering munition	–	EO / IR (Deep learning algorithm for target recognition)	Unknown	Unknown	300 km (190 mi)	Unknown	3 × L-PGW 300 per pod (Note: Two suicide drones and one communication relay drone are paired and mounted per missile.)	Part of the Chunmoo 3.0 armament program. The loitering munition can be mounted on the CTM-290 rocket.
Training rocket	Target practice rocket	239 mm (9.4 in)	Unguided	Inert warhead	K223 rocket motor	5 to 8 km (3.1 to 5.0 mi)	Unknown	6 × training rocket per pod	Surrogate for the CGR-080.

== Improvements ==
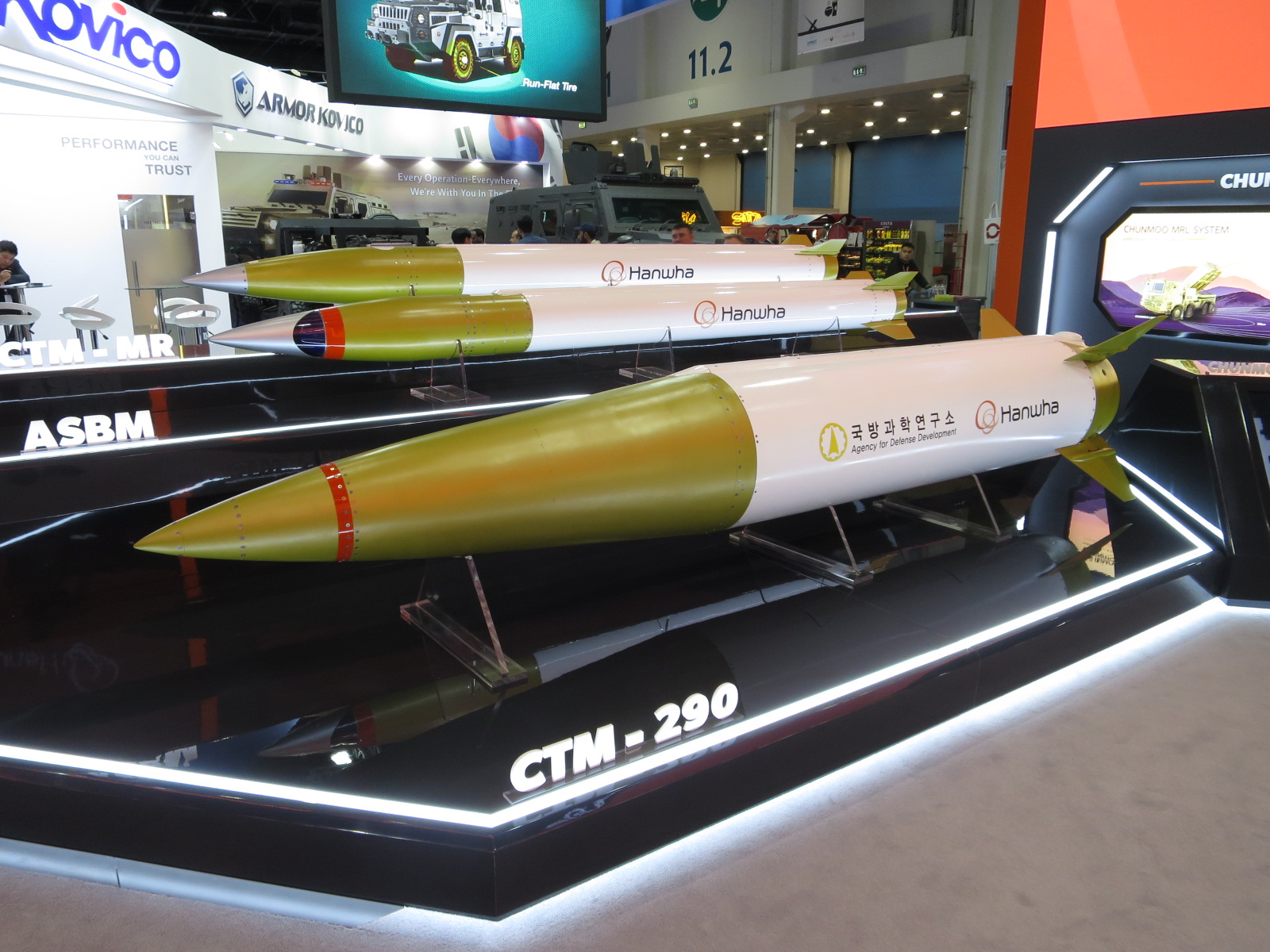
A full-scale models of CTM-MR, CTM-ASBM and CTM-290 on display

=== Ure-2 (CTM-290) ===
On 27 April 2022, South Korean Defense Acquisition Program Administration announced a plan to develop a vehicle-mounted tactical surface-to-surface guided weapon (Ure-2). The purpose of this development project is to improve the existing Ure-1 to increase the range from 180 kilometers (110 mi) to 290 kilometers (180 mi) and integrate tactical ballistic missile systems into various types of Transporter Erector Launcher (TEL) such as the K239 Chunmoo. The development project is scheduled to begin in 2023 and plans to complete the development with a total budget of 1.56 trillion won (US$1.232 billion) by 2034.

On 21 December 2022, the Agency for Defense Development conducted a public test of Ure-2 under further development at Anheung Proving Ground. The missile was mounted on the K239 Chunmoo vehicle and hit a target 200 kilometers away after it was launched.

On 13 March 2023, the 150th Defense Acquisition Program Promotion Committee deliberated and approved the basic strategy and system development plan for developing a vehicle-mounted tactical surface-to-surface missile, and the revised plan included the agenda of completing the development of Ure-2 by 2032, two years earlier than the previous plan.

On 24 April 2024, ADD conducted a test launch of CTM-290 integrated into the Homar-K system in the presence of Poland's Deputy Defense Minister Paweł Bejda and government officials from each country. The missile that was launched successfully hit the target after flying for more than 200 seconds.

On 19 October 2026, the first CTM-290 missiles developed for the Chunmoo launcher platform were delivered to the Polish Land Forces.

=== Extended-range rockets ===
In June 2022, South Korean Agency for Defense Development (ADD) revealed efforts to increase the range of the Chunmoo's 239 mm rockets to 200 kilometers (120 mi). This would give them range similar to the North Korean 300 mm KN-09. Research and development efforts are evaluating ducted rocket propulsion technology, which adds an air inlet that absorbs external air and combines it with a gas generator for combustion to produce greater thrust, as well as a valve that controls the flow of gas for maneuvering. There is also research into a larger 400 mm rocket based on a miniaturized version of the Ure surface to surface missile, which the Chunmoo could carry four of.

== Variants ==
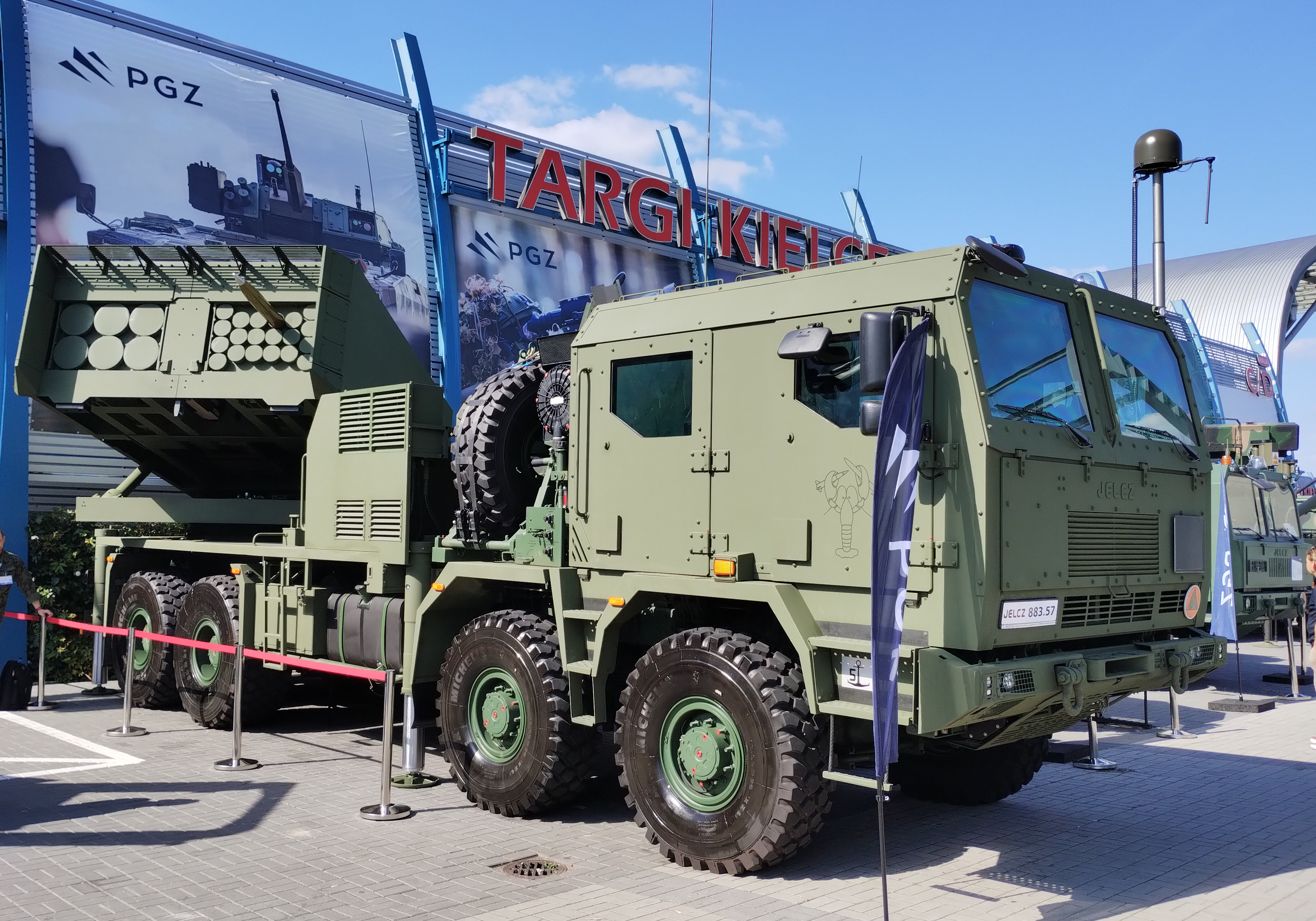
Homar-K prototype on Jelcz P882.57 chassis

=== Homar-K ===
Homar-K (English: Lobster; K for koreański, meaning Korean) is a Polish multiple launch rocket system combining the improved K239 launcher and Jelcz P882.57 8x8 chassis (ultimately to be replaced with the third-generation Jelcz P883.57 chassis) produced by Huta Stalowa Wola. Built to meet Polish military requirements, the system is equipped with Topaz Integrated Combat Management System and is armed with a South Korean 239 mm CGR-080 guided rocket produced in Poland under license as well as a 600 mm CTM-290 tactical ballistic missile (Chunmoo Tactical Missile) with a range of 290 kilometers (180 mi). Further development is underway for integration with Polish 122 mm M-21 Feniks unguided rocket.

The Homar-K program also envisages the production of a Polonized missile launcher module by Huta Stalowa Wola. Poland ordered a total of 290 launchers, the first of which entered service with the Polish Land Forces in 2023. As of 25 June 2025, over 100 launchers were in active service.

== Export ==
=== United Arab Emirates ===
In 2017, Hanwha Defense announced at ADEX (Aerospace & Defense Exhibition) in Seoul that it had signed a nondisclosure contract worth 700 billion won to export K239 Chunmoo to a certain country in the Middle East, and it was later revealed that the United Arab Emirates signed a supply contract with Hanwha Defense, including 12 K239 Chunmoos, 12 K239T Ammunition Support Vehicles, GPS-guided rockets, and munitions. Later, In February 2021, 12 K239 Chunmoo systems and 12 K239T Ammunition Support Vehicles were delivered to the United Arab Emirates.

=== Saudi Arabia ===
At the World Defense Show in Riyadh, Saudi Arabia, on March 9, 2022, Hanwha signed a defense export contract worth 1 trillion won ($800 million) with the Saudi Arabian Ministry of Defense, but details of the contract were not known. It was later confirmed on 31 March 2023 that an unknown number of Chunmoo was being serviced by the Royal Saudi Land Forces. As in the past cases with the UAE, it is presumed that it has signed a non-disclosure contract.

=== Poland ===
On 27 August 2022, Poland's defense minister, Mariusz Błaszczak, said there are ongoing negotiations to acquire South Korea's rocket artillery system. On 13 October 2022, Polish Armament Agency announced that the negotiations with South Korea to acquire nearly 300 K239 Chunmoo systems had been completed and the framework agreement will be signed on October 17. Poland had originally intended to procure 500 American M142 HIMARS launchers, but such an order could not be fulfilled in a satisfactory timeline, so decision was made to split the HIMARS order into two stages, buying less of them and adding Chunmoo procurement; the first South Korean launchers are to be delivered in 2023. A supply contract for 288 Chunmoo MLRS mounted on Jelcz 8x8 chassis and equipped with Polish TOPAZ Integrated Combat Management System along with 23 thousand missiles with the range of 80 and 290 kilometers was signed in Poland on October 19, 2022. On 20 August 2023, first Homar-K, which completed system integration and testing in South Korea, was deployed to the 18th Mechanised Division of the Polish Land Forces after being delivered to Poland.

=== Estonia ===
On 23 October 2025, the Estonian and South Korean defence ministers signed a defense cooperation agreement, under which the Estonian Defence Forces intends to acquire K239 Chunmoo systems. Later, On 21 December 2025, the Estonian Centre for Defence Investments (ECDI) and the Korea Trade-Investment Promotion Agency (KOTRA) signed an intergovernmental (G2G) export contract worth 300 million euros (₩520 billion) to introduce the K239 Chunmoo system. Under the contract, Hanwha Aerospace will supply Estonia with six Chunmoo launcher vehicles and three types of missiles over the next three years. On 11 May, 2026, Estonian Center for Defense Investments announced a purchase of 3 more systems, bringing the total number to nine units. First systems are expected to arrive in Estonian in the second half of 2027.

=== Norway ===
On 27 September 2022, Hanwha Defense signed a memorandum of understanding (MOU) with Norway's Kongsberg Gruppen to introduce the K239 Chunmoo multiple rocket artillery system. On 27 January 2026, the Norwegian Parliament approved the government's proposal to purchase the K239 Chunmoo system with a budget of 19 billion krone. Hanwha Aerospace will sign a supply contract with the Norwegian government in January and will be supplied to the Norwegian Army from 2029. On 30 January 2026, the Norwegian government, through The Norwegian Defence Materiel Agency (NDMA) signed a contract for procuring 16 K239 Chunmoo systems and a significant amount of precision-guided missiles, plus training and logistical support from Hanwha Areospace. There will be three types of missiles with a range of up to 500 kilometers. Hanwha will set up a production line for the missiles in Poland, which will supply all the European operators. The K239 mobile launchers are expected to be delivered in 2028 and 2029, with the missiles expected to be delivered in 2030 and 2031.

=== Croatia ===
On 4 September 2026, the Croatian government decided to purchase 18 K239 Chunmoo systems with a budget of 544 million euros to replace the Croatian Army’s outdated M-92 Vulkan and APR-40 (Romanian version of the BM-21 Grad) systems and to acquire a new long-range multiple rocket artillery system. According to the contract terms, the rocket artillery system scheduled to be delivered to Croatia from 2026 to 2029 will include sub-systems supplied by Hanwha Aerospace and WB Electronics.

On 10 September 2026, Hanwha signed a 410 million euros contract with the Croatian Ministry of Defense to supply 18 Chunmoo systems. While initial statements mentioned missiles of more than a 300 km range (CTM-290), on 9 October Andrej Plenković confirmed the purchase of CTM-X with a range of 500 km.

== Operators ==
A map of operators of the K239 Chunmoo or its variants

=== Current operators ===
Poland
Polish Land Forces – A total of 290 Homar-K systems will be delivered to Polish Land Forces from 2023.

- Armed Forces General Command
  - 18th Mechanised Division
  - 16th Mechanised Division

Saudi Arabia

- Royal Saudi Land Forces – 36 in service with Royal Saudi Land Forces.

South Korea
A total of 218 systems in service with the Republic of Korea Armed Forces.

- Republic of Korea Army
  - Ground Operations Command
    - Fires Brigade
    - Capital Corps
      - Capital Artillery Brigade
    - I Corps
      - 1st Artillery Brigade
      - 1st Infantry Division
      - 9th Infantry Division
      - 25th Infantry Division
    - II Corps
      - 2nd Artillery Brigade
    - III Corps
      - 3rd Artillery Brigade
    - V Corps
      - 3rd Infantry Division
      - 5th Artillery Brigade
      - 6th Infantry Division
    - VII Maneuver Corps
      - 7th Artillery Brigade
      - 8th Maneuver Division
      - 11th Maneuver Division
- Republic of Korea Navy
  - Republic of Korea Marine Corps
    - 6th Marine Brigade
    - Marine Yeonpyeong Unit

United Arab Emirates

- United Arab Emirates Army – A total of 12 systems are in service in the United Arab Emirates Army.

=== Future operators ===
Croatia

- Croatian Army – A total of 18 K239 Chunmoo self-propelled rocket launchers with accompanying assets and systems. The procurement package includes CTM-290 and CTM-X tactical ballistic missiles with a precision strike range exceeding 300 and 500 km, respectively.

Estonia

- Estonian Land Forces – A total of 9 systems and ammunition, including the CTM-290 tactical ballistic missiles, will be delivered to Estonia under the contract signed in December 2025 and an update signed in May 2026.

Norway

- Norwegian Army – A total of 16 K239 launchers and a significant number of precision-guided missiles, with a range of up to 500 kilometers plus training and logistical support. The Contract was signed with Hanwha Aerospace on 30 January 2026.

=== Potential operators ===
- Egypt: On July 21, 2025, Hanwha Aerospace was reported to be in advanced talks with Egypt for a K239 Chunmoo multiple rocket launcher export. This significant deal includes local production and technology transfer, aiming to modernize Egypt's defense and diversify its arms suppliers.
- Philippines: Officials from the Armed Forces of the Philippines attended the test-firing of KTSSM-II missiles from a K239 Chunmoo-I Multiple Launch Rocket System unit on December 21, 2022. The platform is being considered alongside the M142 HIMARS and the Elbit PULS.
- Romania: On 3 February 2023, Hanwha Aerospace signed an MOU with ROMARM SA, Romania's state-owned defense company, for the production of military equipment and ammunition.

=== Summary ===
Operators	Orders	Acquisition	Losses	In service	Note
Operators	Orders	K239	Losses	In service	Note
(Croatia) Croatian Army	K239 Chunmoo; 18	(+18)	—	0	Batch I: 18 K239s.
(Estonia) Estonian Land Forces	K239 Chunmoo; 9	(+9)	—	0	Batch I: 6 K239s.
(Norway) Norwegian Army	GUNGNIR; 16	(+16)	—	0	Batch I: 16 K239s.
(Poland) Polish Land Forces	HOMAR-K; 290	90 (+200)	—	90	Batch I: 218 K239 launcher modules. Batch II: 72 modules.
(South Korea) Republic of Korea Army and Marine Corps	K239 Chunmoo; 367	218 (+149)	—	218	Batch I: 218 K239s. Batch II: 149 K239s.
(Saudi Arabia) Royal Saudi Land Forces	K239 Chunmoo; 36	36	—	36	
United Arab Emirates Army	K239 Chunmoo; 12	12	—	12	
In service	Total orders 745	356	—	356	
In service	Total orders 745	Total acquired: 523 To be manufactured: 389	—	356	

Legend of the colored numbers in the table:

Systems assembled and produced in South Korea
Systems assembled or produced outside of South Korea
2nd hand sold/transferred [ - ] and bought/received [ + ]
System upgraded, one variant to the other [ - ] / [ + ]

== See also ==
- K136 Kooryong - South Korea's 36 extended multiple rocket artillery system
- M270 – (United States)

=== Weapons of comparable role, performance and era ===
- Astros II – (Brazil)
- Fath 360 – (Iran)
- GMARS – (Germany, United States)
- M142 HIMARS – (United States)
- LAR-160 – (Israel)
- PHL-03 – (China)
- PHL-16 – (China)
- Pinaka multi-barrel rocket launcher – (India)
- PULS – (Israel)
- Thunderbolt-2000 – (Taiwan)
- TOS-2 – (Russia)
- TRG-300 Tiger – (Turkey)
