= Type 75 130 mm multiple rocket launcher =

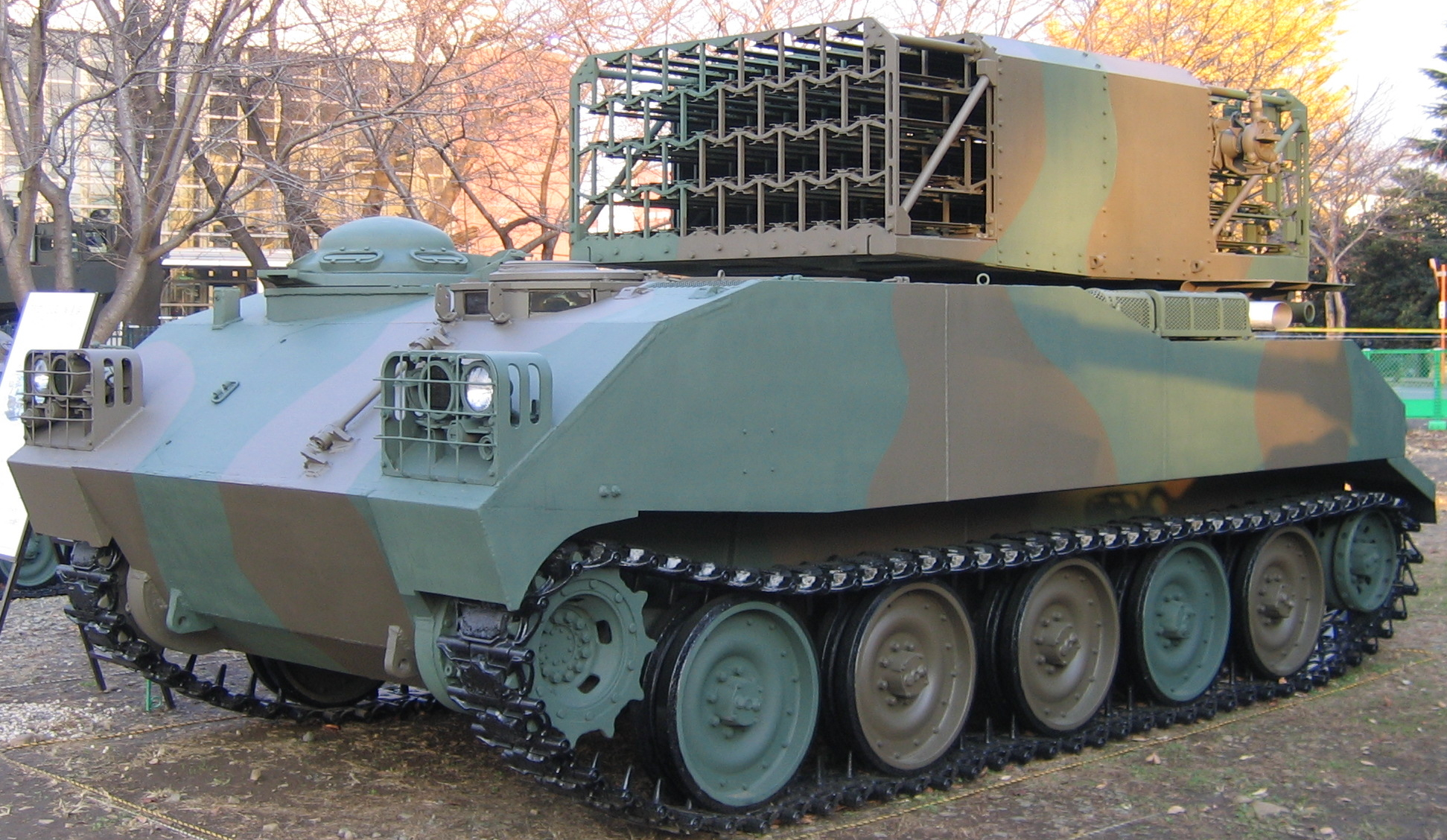
- A Type 75 130 mm multiple rocket launcher at the Sinbudai Old Weapon Museum, Camp Asaka
- Type: Multiple rocket launcher
- Place of origin: Japan

Service history
- In service: 1978–2005
- Used by: Japan Ground Self-Defense Force

Production history
- Designer: Technical Research and Development Institute
- Designed: 1965-1975
- Manufacturer: Komatsu (chassis), Nissan (rockets, rocket launcher)
- Produced: 1976–1985
- No. built: 66
- Variants: see Variants

Specifications
- Mass: 16.5 t (16.2 long tons)
- Length: 5.78 m (19 ft 0 in)
- Width: 2.80 m (9 ft 2 in)
- Height: 2.67 m (8 ft 9 in)
- Crew: 3
- Shell weight: 43 kg (95 lb)
- Caliber: 131.5 mm (5.18 in)
- Barrels: 30
- Elevation: 0° to +50°
- Traverse: 100°
- Muzzle velocity: 700 m/s (2,300 ft/s)
- Maximum firing range: 15,000 m (16,000 yd)
- Filling weight: 15 kg (33 lb)
- Armor: Aluminium
- Main armament: 130 mm rocket launcher (30 rounds)
- Secondary armament: 12.7 mm M2 Browning heavy machine gun (600 rounds)
- Engine: Mitsubishi 4ZF21WT V4 air-cooled diesel 300 hp (220 kW) (2.200 rpm)
- Power/weight: 18.18 hp/t (13.56 kW/t)
- Suspension: Torsion bar
- Ground clearance: 0.4 metres (1 ft 4 in)
- Fuel capacity: 410 L (110 US gal)
- Operational range: 300 km (190 mi)
- Maximum speed: 50 km/h (31 mph)

The Type 75 130 mm multiple rocket launcher (75式130mm自走多連装ロケット弾発射機, Nana-go-shiki hyakusanjū-miri jisou-tarensou-rokettodan-hasshaki) was a self-propelled multiple rocket launcher exclusively used by the Japan Ground Self-Defense Force. With the chassis built by Komatsu and the rocket launcher with rockets produced by Nissan, the vehicle used the suspension, tracks, and diesel engine of the Type 73 armoured personnel carrier. All Type 75s were retired in the 2000s and replaced by the M270 Multiple Launch Rocket System.

== Development ==
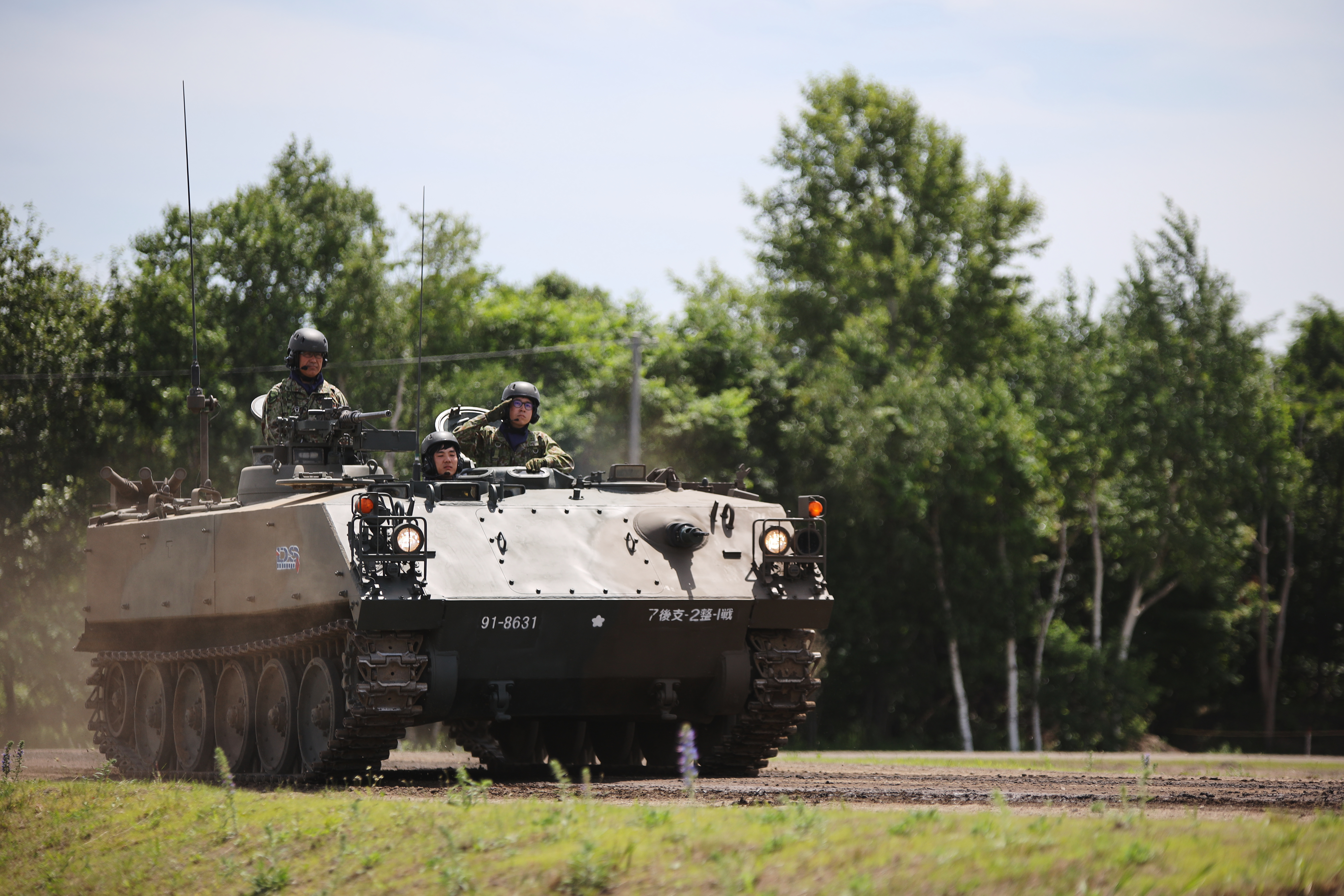
The Type 75 utilised components from the Type 73 armoured personnel carrier, including its engine.

Research into developing rocket launchers for the Japan Ground Self-Defence started in 1955. Early efforts waned due to expected deliveries from the United States. After reluctance from the United States to supply long-range rockets to Japan, a domestic solution was pursued instead – the Type 67 Model 30 rocket launcher. The combination of the rocket launcher's comparatively short range, small warhead, low number of rockets, and inaccuracy prompted the development of a multiple rocket launcher.

The Technical Research and Development Institute began developing the Type 75 in 1965. Initial performance specifications were drafted in 1966 and finalised in 1967. Further design objectives were defined in 1968, which led to prototyping the chassis and rocket launcher in 1969–1970. Komatsu developed the chassis, and Nissan was responsible for the rocket launcher and rockets.

A second (full) prototype was constructed in 1971–1972 and underwent technical testing in 1972–1973. Of the two full-scale prototypes built, the first one used multiple components – notably the road wheels – from Komatsu's SUB 2 prototype for the Type 73 armoured personnel carrier. The second full-scale prototype diverged more from the SUB 2 configuration.

Operational testing started in 1973 and lasted through 1974. Testing uncovered the need to improve the vehicle's gyrocompass, with the changes implemented and its performance validated in 1974. The Type 75 received its official designation in 1975.

== Description ==
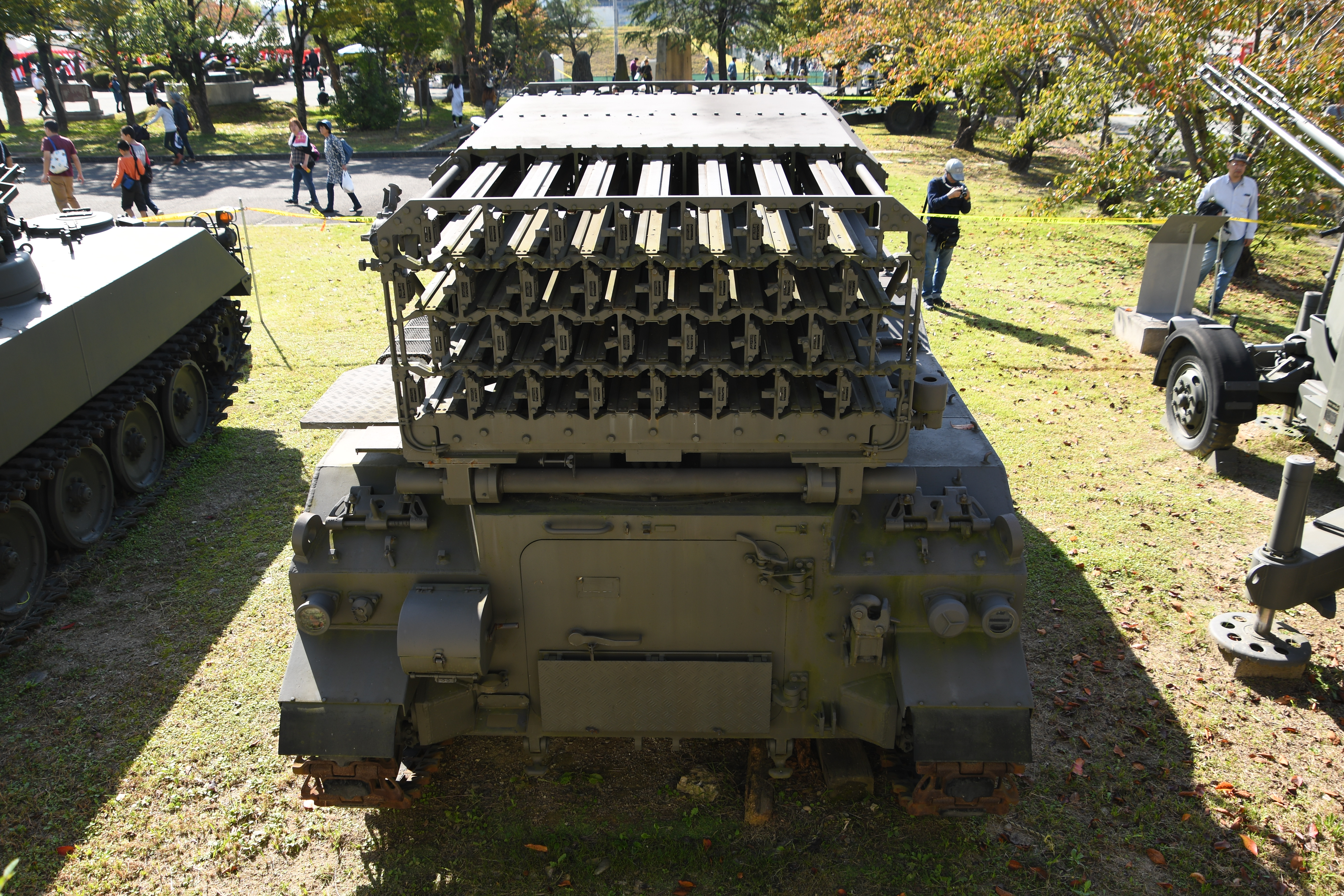
Rockets were launched from frames, making the launcher distinct from contemporary multiple rocket launchers such as the RM-70.

The Type 75 had a welded aluminium hull and was operated by a crew of three (driver, commander, and operator) seated towards the front of the vehicle, with the driver sitting on the left, the commander on the right and the rocket operator sitting behind the commander. The engine was located behind the driver, on the left side of the vehicle, and the roof of the rear hull was lowered to accommodate the rocket launcher. Unlike the Type 73 armoured personnel carrier, the Type 75 is not amphibious.

Mitsubishi's 4ZF21WT two-stroke air-cooled V4 diesel engine developed 300 hp at 2,200 rpm. The same engine propelled the Type 73 armoured personnel carrier and the Type 74 105 mm self-propelled howitzer. In addition to diesel, the 4ZF21WT could also run on gasoline and JP-4 jet fuel.

A launcher for 30 rockets was fitted on the rear of the vehicle's hull, with the launch rails placed in four rows (seven, eight, seven, and eight rockets). The mid-section of the launcher was covered by steel armour plates to protect the rockets. The rockets were fin-stabilised, with a 15 kg (33 lb) warhead, and had a range of up to 15,000 m (9.3 mi). They could be fired individually or in a 12-second ripple. Rockets were reloaded manually.

A single 12.7 mm M2 Browning anti-aircraft machine gun was mounted on the commander's hatch. Up to 600 rounds of ammunition were stored for the machine gun. The 7.62 mm Type 74 bow machine gun present on the Type 73 armoured personnel carrier was omitted from the Type 75.

== Operational history ==
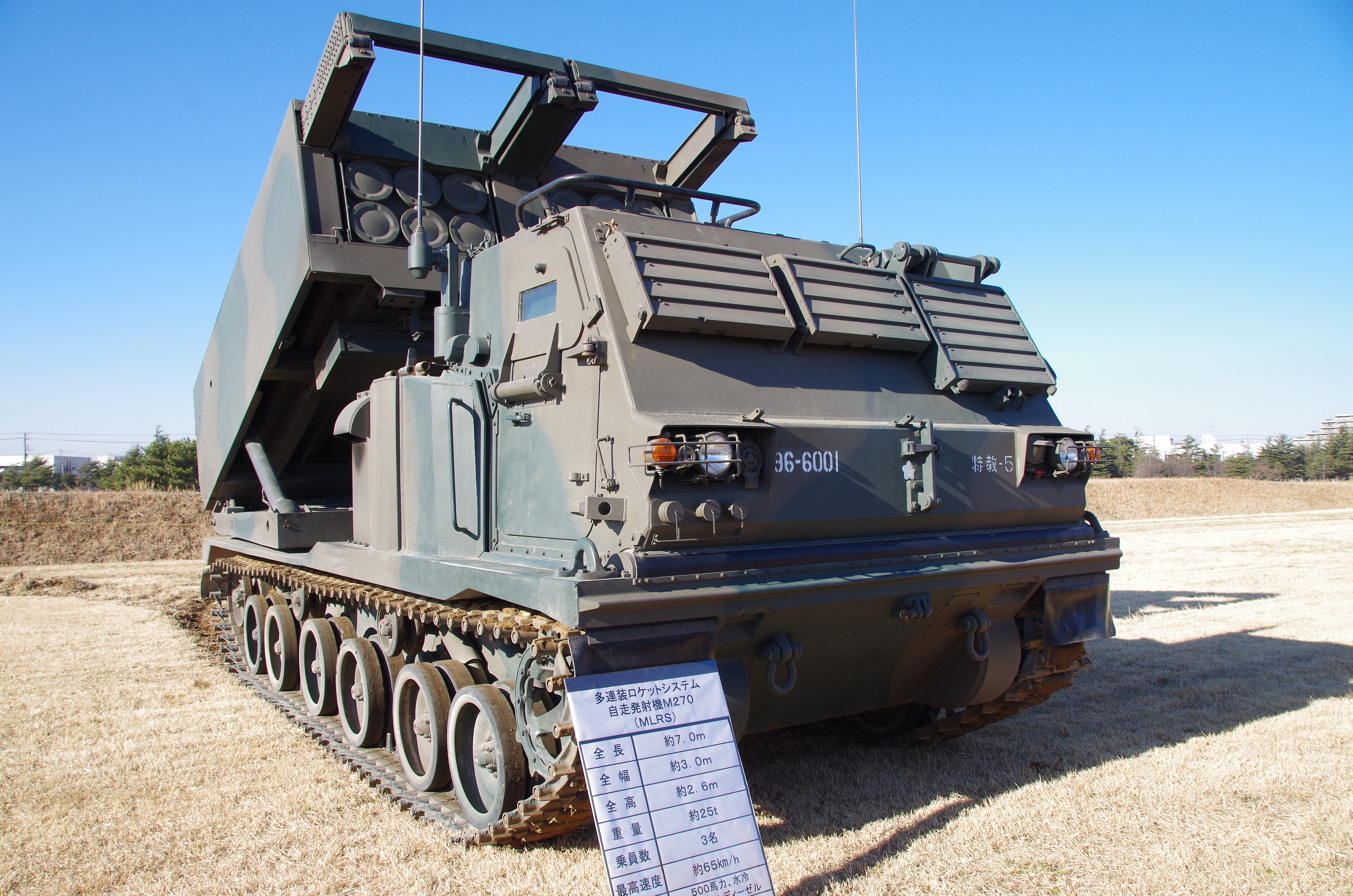
The M270 Multiple Launch Rocket System replaced the Type 75 in Japan Ground Self-Defense Force service.

First four Type 75s were procured in 1976, followed by six in 1977, and then eight vehicles each year until procurement ended with 66 multiple rocket launchers produced.

Large format force deployment of the Type 75 to Japan Ground Self-Defense Force's training units began in March 1978. In 2001, Japan reported to the United Nations Office for Disarmament Affairs that 61 Type 75s were in service as well as 13 Type 75 wind measurement vehicles.

As the license-built M270 Multiple Launch Rocket System began entering service in numbers in late 1990s and deliveries of the Type 99 155 mm self-propelled howitzer progressed, Type 75s were gradually retired. According to the United Nations Register of Conventional Arms' 2005 report, 17 were still in service. A year later, Japan reported to the register that no Type 75 multiple rocket launchers nor Type 75 wind measurement vehicles were in service.

== Variants ==
- The Type 75 wind measurement vehicle provided meteorological data for the multiple rocket launcher units. Its chassis bore greater semblance to the Type 73 armoured personnel carrier than the Type 75 multiple rocket launcher. Instead of the rocket launcher, a meteorological sensor suite was installed on top of the rear hull. Up to 15 were produced, although 13 remained in service by 2001. The last wind measurement vehicles were retired alongside multiple rocket launchers in 2005.

== Gallery ==
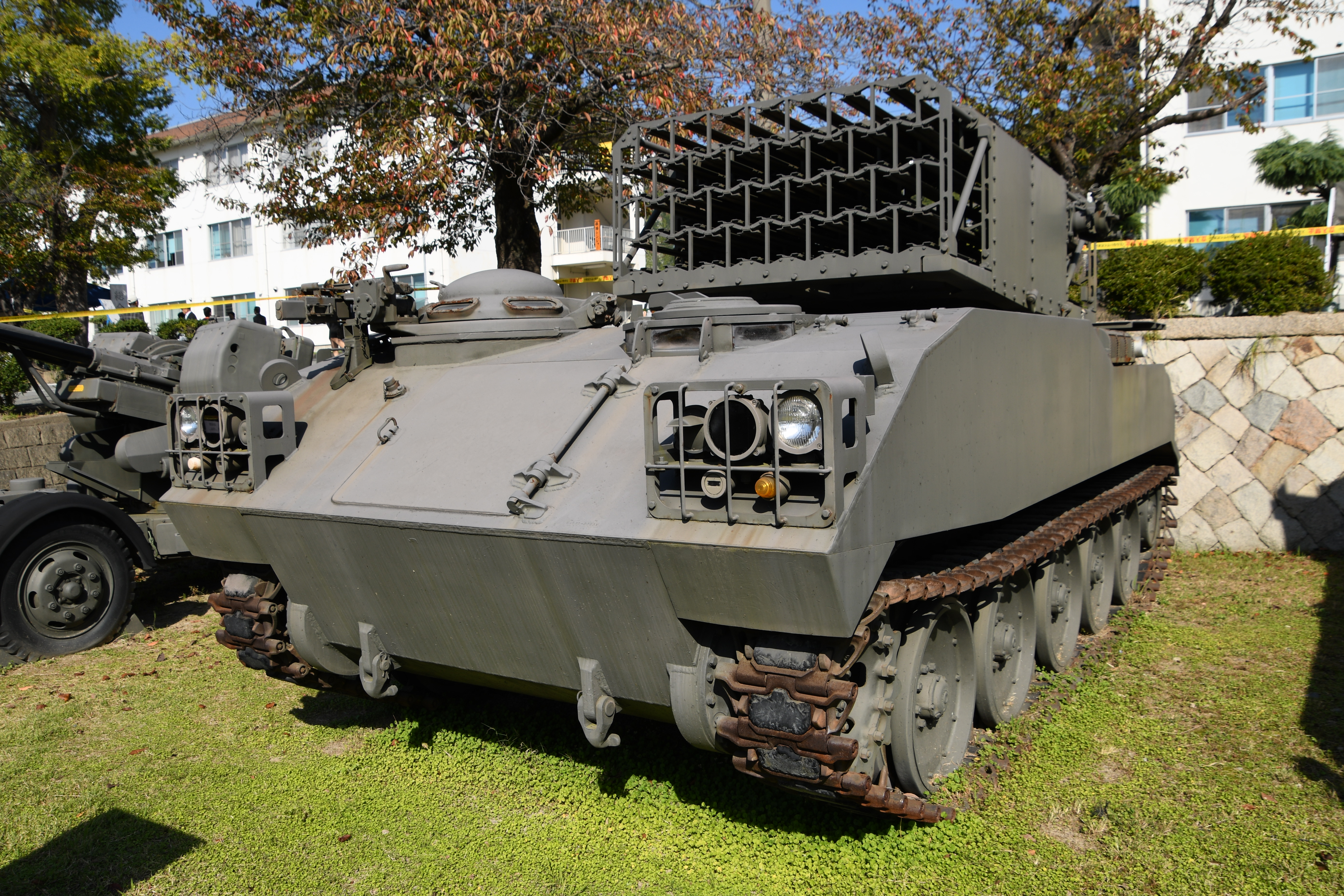
Left front view of the Type 75

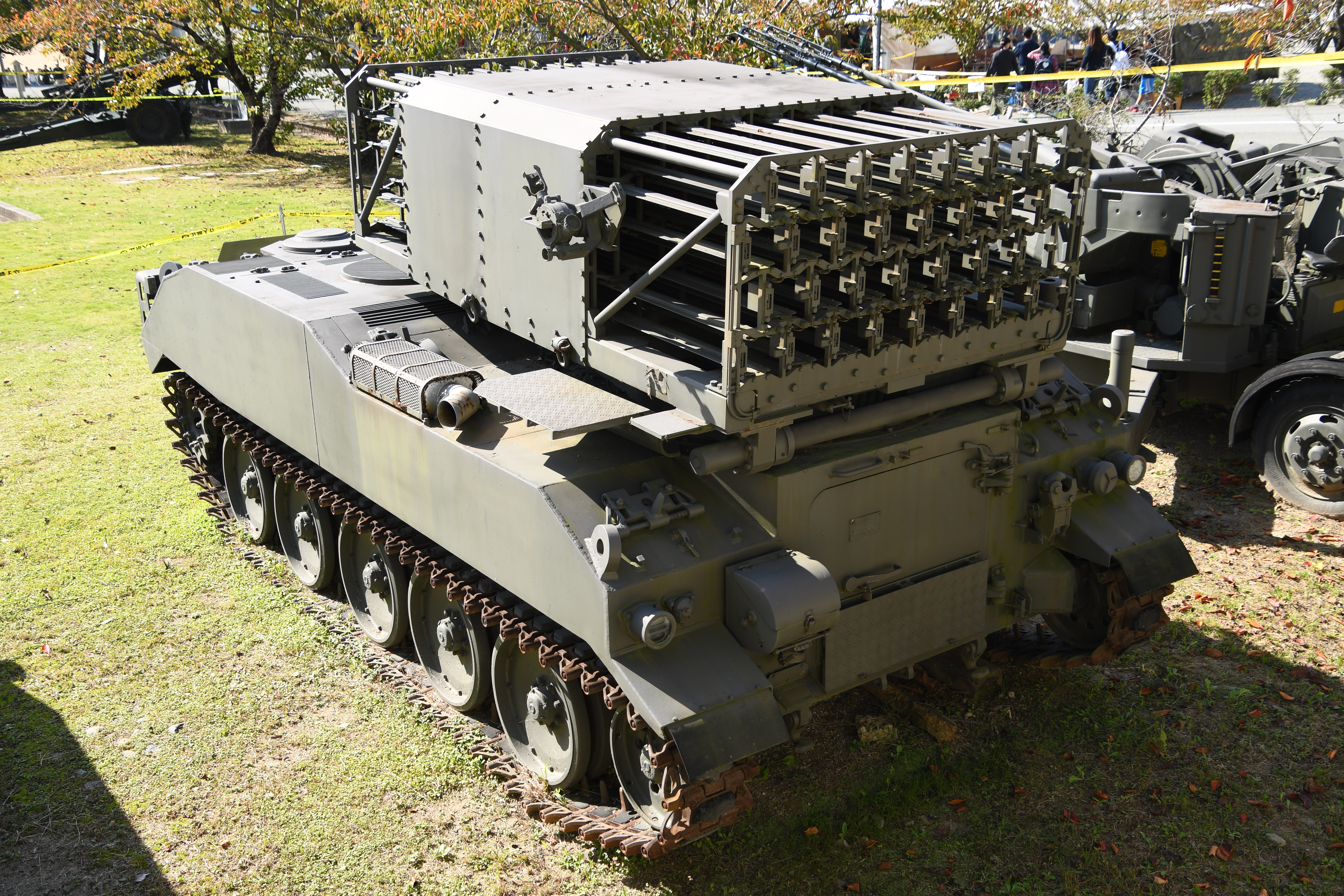
Left rear view of the Type 75

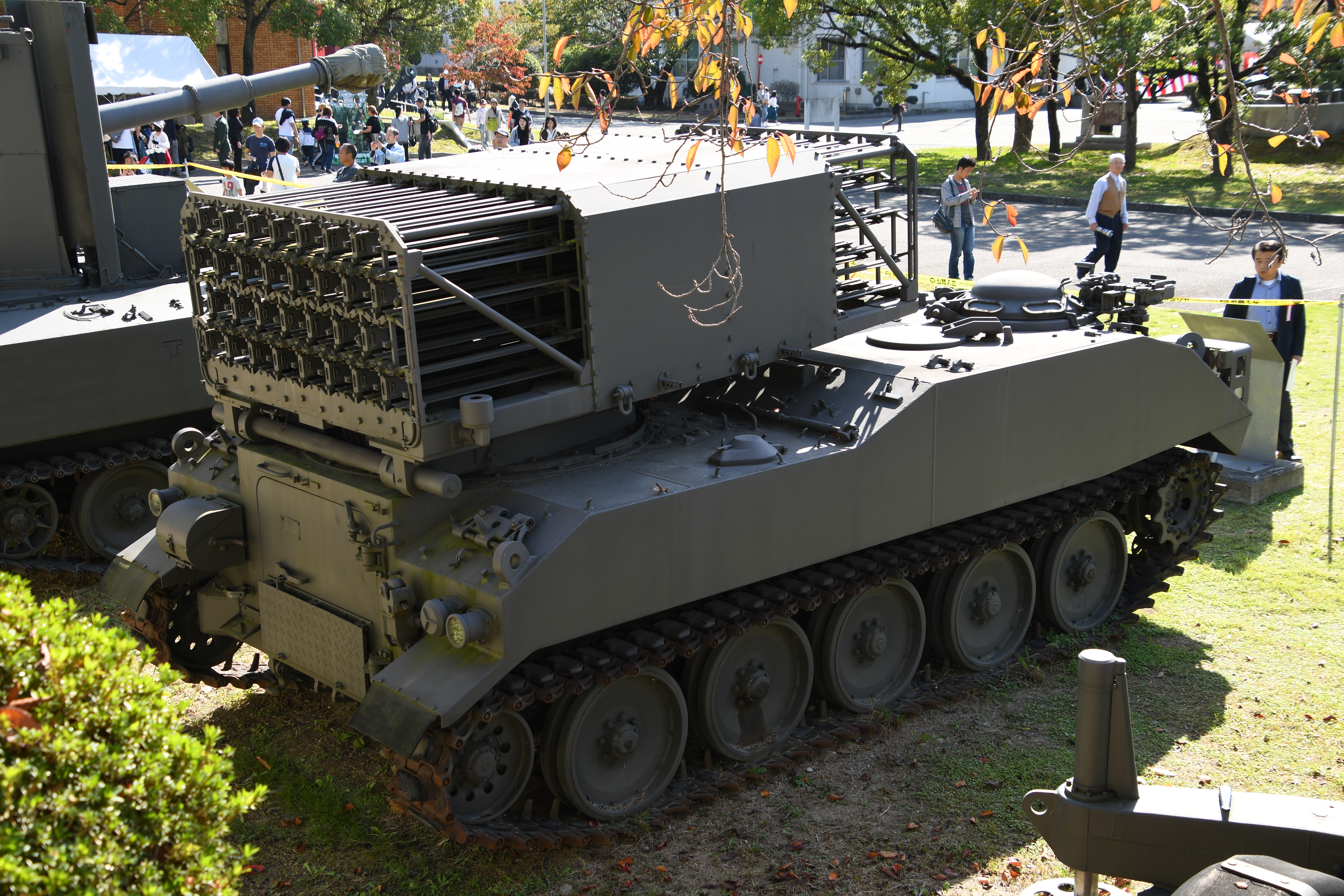
Right rear view of the Type 75

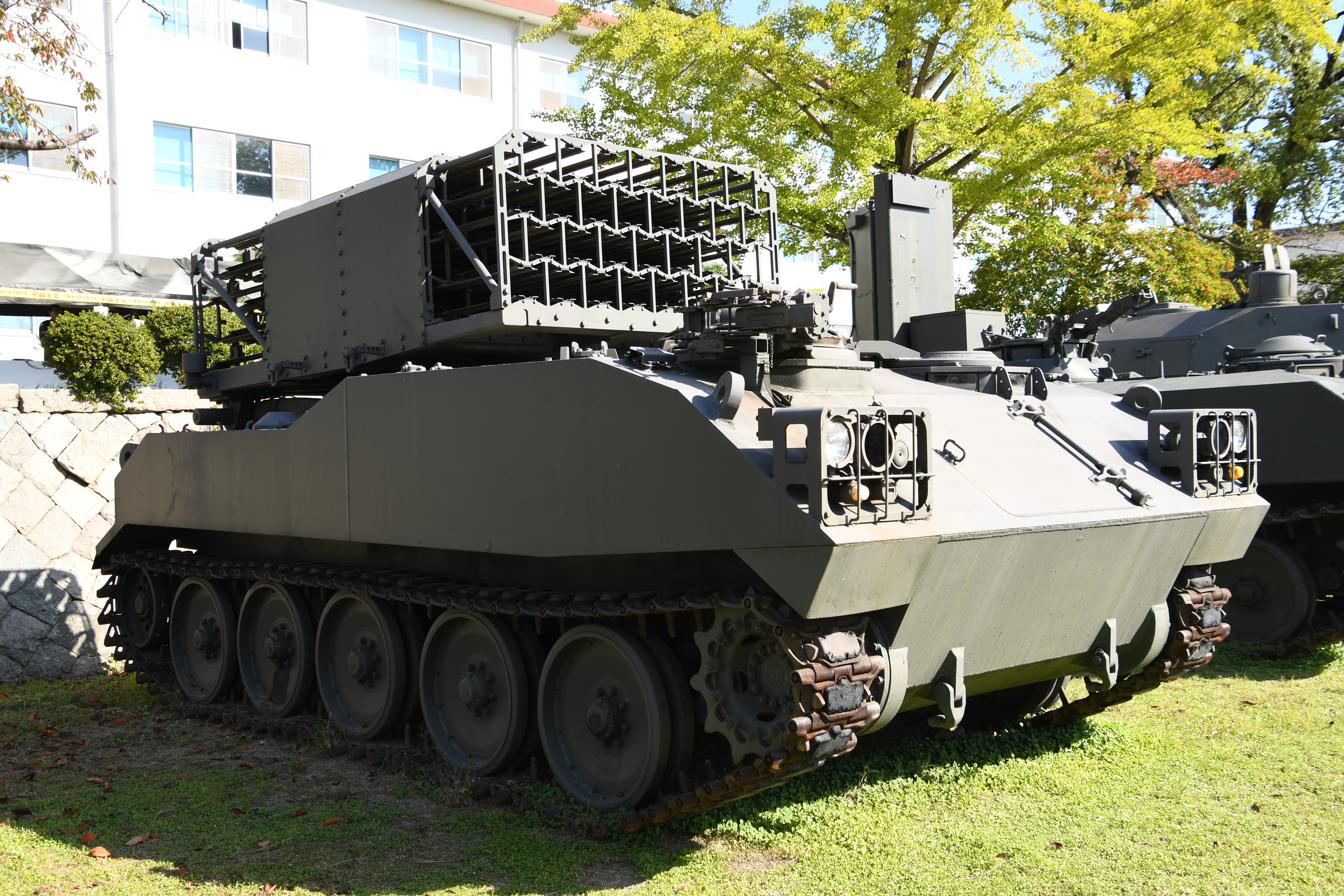
Front right view of the Type 75

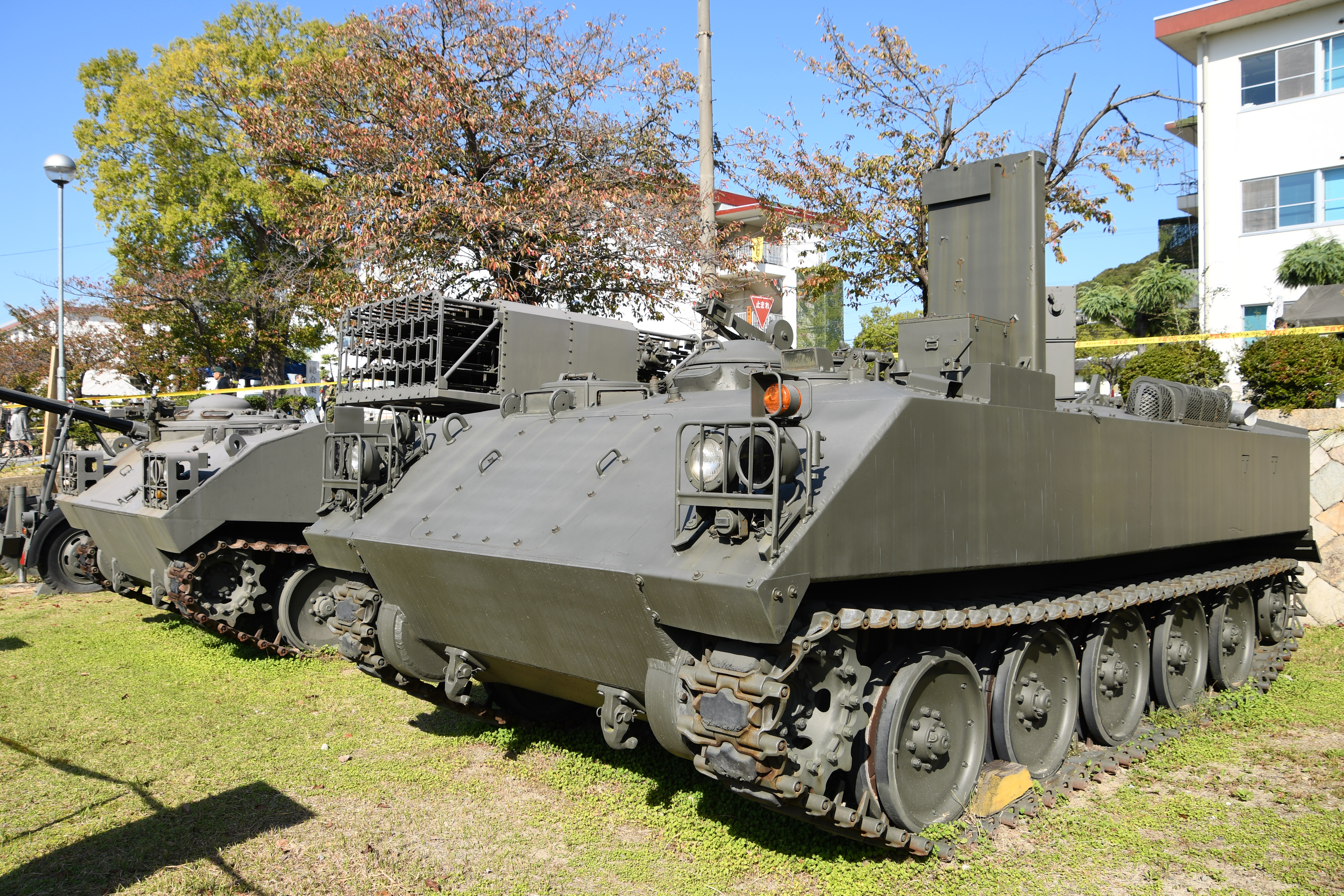
A Type 75 130 mm multiple rocket launcher (left) and a Type 75 wind measurement vehicle

== Similar vehicles ==
- BM-21 Grad – (Soviet Union)
- K136 Kooryong – (South Korea)
- Kung Feng – (Taiwan)
- Light Artillery Rocket System – (West Germany)
- M-77 Oganj – (Yugoslavia)
- PHL-81 – (China)
- RM-70 – (Czechoslovakia)
