= Ure (missile) =

South Korean tactical ballistic missile

Ure KTSSM
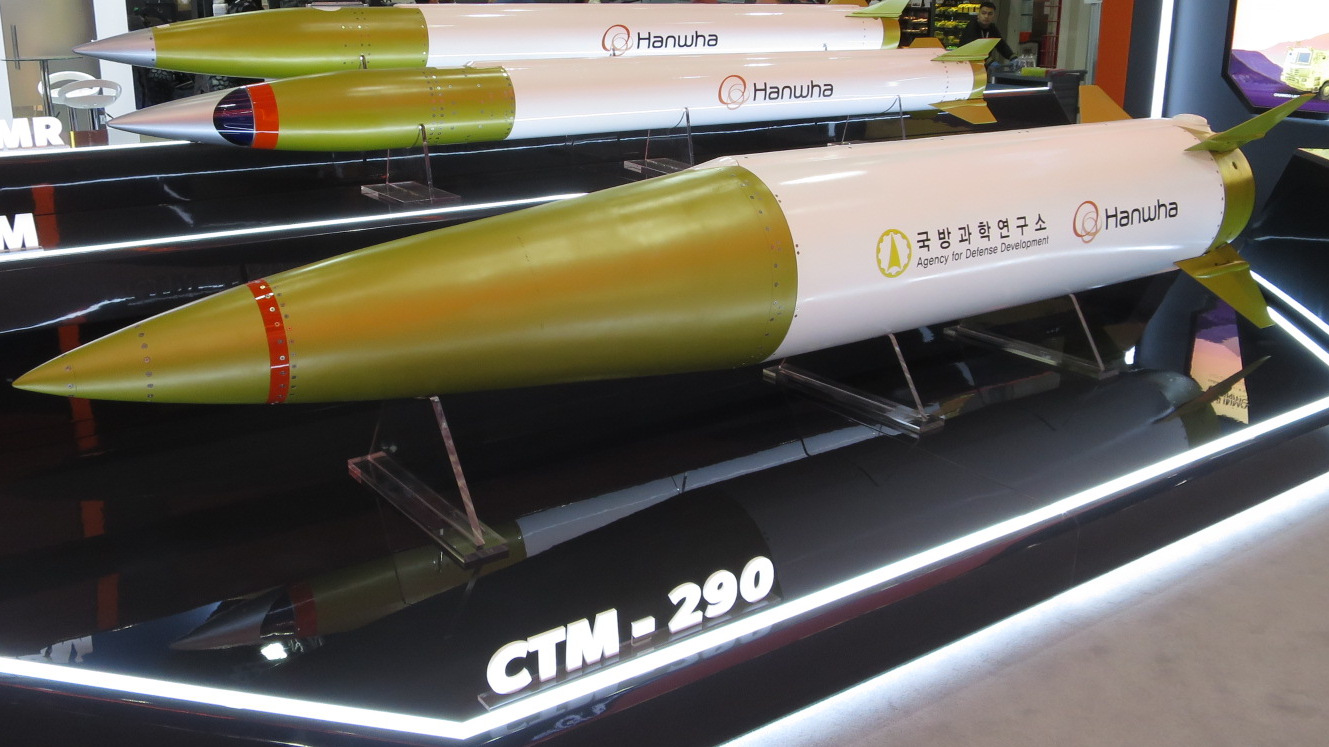
- A CTM-290 tactical missile of Ure Block 2, modified for the transporter erector launcher (TEL) platform
- Type: Surface-to-surface missile Tactical ballistic missile
- Place of origin: South Korea

Service history
- In service: 2025–present
- Used by: Republic of Korea Armed Forces; Polish Armed Forces

Production history
- Designer: Agency for Defense Development; Hanwha Group
- Designed: Block 1: 2014–2019; Block 2: 2023–2025
- Manufacturer: Hanwha Aerospace
- Unit cost: ₩800 million
- Produced: 2020–present
- No. built: 200 (2020–2025)

Specifications
- Mass: 1.5 metric tons (3,300 lb)
- Length: 4 meters (13 ft 1 in)
- Diameter: 600 millimeters (24 in)
- Warhead: Block 1: thermobaric Block 2: unitary high-explosive, or thermobaric
- Warhead weight: Block 1: 500 kilograms (1,100 lb)
- Propellant: Composite propellant
- Operational range: Block 1: 180 km (110 mi); Block 2: 290 km (180 mi)
- Guidance system: GPS/INS
- Accuracy: Block 1: 2 meters CEP; Block 2 : 9 meters CEP
- Launch platform: Block1: Fixed launcher Block 2: Transporter erector launcher (TEL)

The Ure (Hangul: 우레; English: Thunder), or often called KTSSM (Korean Tactical Surface-to-Surface Missile; Korean: 한국형 전술 지대지 유도탄; Hanja: 韓國型戰術地對地誘導彈; RR: Hangukhyeong Jeonsul Jidaeji Yudotan) is a short-range tactical surface-to-surface missile (SSM) developed through the Lightning Project (Korean: 번개사업; RR: Beongae Saeop) that began as a countermeasure against North Korea's conventional artillery raised in the wake of the Bombardment of Yeonpyong Island.

The Block 1 for fixed launcher platform, which was developed in 2019, was jointly developed with Hanwha Group under the leadership of Agency for Defense Development (ADD) and is currently developing an improved Block 2 version to operate on various transporter erector launcher (TEL) platforms.

Block 1 was deployed to the Republic of Korea Armed Forces in February 2025, and the Block 2 CTM-290 was deployed to the Polish Armed Forces in October 2026.

== Design and development ==
The Ure (KTSSM) was developed with the intention of quickly neutralizing North Korean long-range artillery. Dubbed the "artillery killer," Hanwha Corporation designed the missile in partnership with the Agency for Defense Development (ADD). Four missiles can be launched almost simultaneously from a fixed launch pad and they can travel 180 kilometers (110 mi); the launcher and missiles as a set have a combined cost of $1.9 million. They are GPS-guided to hit targets within two meters and have a shaped thermal warhead that can penetrate bunkers and hardened, dug-in targets several meters underground or 1.5 meters (4.9 ft) of concrete. While it resembles the American MGM-140 ATACMS missile, the KTSSM is cheaper and more accurate with a shorter range, though still adequate to perform the counterbattery role. There are two versions of the missile: KTSSM-1 for attacking M-1978 Koksan 170 mm howitzers and M1985/M1991 240 mm unguided multiple rocket launchers (MRLs); and KTSSM-2, a self-propelled system tasked with engaging KN-09 300 mm MRLs and KN-02 short-range ballistic missiles, having a Block I version employing a thermal penetrating warhead and a Block II version with a unitary high-explosive warhead.

Development lasted from 2014-2017 at a cost of US$418 million, and it was successfully test-launched in October 2017. In March 2018, the South Korean Army announced it would create a new artillery brigade composed of KTSSM-2 and K239 Chunmoo multiple launch rocket systems with the aim of destroying North Korea’s hardened long-range artillery sites near the Korean Demilitarized Zone, to be inaugurated in October of that year. Fielding was planned for 2019, but initially postponed to 2023 because the United States had yet to approve the purchase of important components. In 2019, it was reported that the KTSSM would be deployed in 2021. In November 2020, Defense Acquisition Program Administration (DAPA) announced mass production would begin for the missile to enter service in 2022, with more than 200 units planned to be made by 2025.

=== Improvements ===
==== Block 2 ====
On 27 April 2022, South Korean Defense Acquisition Program Administration (DAPA) announced a plan to develop a vehicle-mounted tactical surface-to-surface guided weapon (KTSSM-2). The purpose of this development project is to improve the existing KTSSM-1 to increase the range from 180 kilometers (110 mi) to 290 kilometers (180 mi) and integrate tactical ballistic missile systems into various types of Transporter Erector Launcher (TEL) such as the K239 Chunmoo.

On 21 December 2022, the Agency for Defense Development conducted a public test of the Block 2 missile under development after inviting military officials from each country at the Anheung Proving Ground. The missile was mounted on the K239 Chunmoo vehicle and hit a target 200 kilometers (120 mi) away after it was launched.

On 13 March 2023, the 150th Defense Project Promotion Committee deliberated and approved the basic strategy and system development plan for developing a vehicle-mounted Tactical Surface-to-Surface Missile, and the revised plan included the agenda of completing the development of KTSSM-2 by 2032, two years earlier than the previous plan.

On 11 May 2023, the South Korean Defense Agency for Technology and Quality (DTaQ) announced that it had successfully passed the quality certification launch test of Block I produced through the mass production process.

On 24 April 2024, ADD conducted a test launch of CTM290 integrated into the Homar-K system in the presence of Poland's Deputy Defense Minister Paweł Bejda and government officials from each country. The missile that was launched successfully hit the target after flying for more than 200 seconds.

== Export ==
=== Saudi Arabia ===
In August 2025, Hanwha Aerospace signed a contract worth 400 billion won ($286.9 million) to supply Saudi Arabia with hundreds of Block 2 CTM-290 tactical ballistic missiles developed for the K239 Chunmoo system.

=== Poland ===
In October 2022, an agreement was signed to deliver 288 K239 Chunmoo K-MLRS to the Polish Land Forces. The first stage of the program has a supply of ammunition, including KTSSM-II (CTM-290) TBMs, which is planned to ultimately be produced by Poland itself. On 19 October 2026, the first CTM-290 tactical ballistic missile was delivered to the Polish Armed Forces.

== Operators ==
A map of operators of the Ure or its variants

=== Current operators ===
Poland – On 19 October 2026, Polish Land Forces received CTM-290 tactical ballistic missiles.

- Block II: An unknown number of CTM-290s produced in South Korea

South Korea – Hundreds of missiles have been produced since December 2020 and have been deployed to the Republic of Korea Armed Forces from February 2025.

- Block I: A 2026 study published by the International Institute for Strategic Studies found that about 300 KTSSM-I missiles had been deployed in three hardened blockhouses.

=== Future operators ===
Estonia

- Estonian Defence Forces – Contract signed in December 2025, as part of the deal to purchase K239 Chunmoo.

Saudi Arabia

- Saudi Arabian Army – In August 2025, Saudi Arabia signed a contract with Hanwha to purchase hundreds of CTM-290 tactical ballistic missiles.

Croatia

- Croatian Army – On order. Acquired CTM-290 tactical ballistic missiles as part of the K239 Chunmoo procurement package in September 2026.

== See also ==
- Hyunmoo – (South Korea)
- MGM-140 ATACMS – (United States)
- Hwasong-11B – (North Korea) (KN-24)
- Hwasong-11D – (North Korea)
