= K136 =

K136 or K-136 may refer to:

- K-136 (Kansas highway), a state highway in Kansas
- K-136 (1945–1985), a former state highway in Kansas
- K136 Kooryong, a South Korean rocket artillery system
