= Type 67 =

Type 67 may refer to:

- Type 67 mortar, mortar, China, introduced 1967
- Type 67 machine gun, China, introduced 1967
- Type 67 (silenced pistol), semi-automatic silenced pistol, China, introduced 1968
- Type 67 hand grenade, hand grenade produced by China
- Type 67 Model 30 rocket artillery, self-propelled rocket launcher
- Type 67 Armored Vehicle Launch Bridge, Japan, variant of the Type 61 tank
