= Type 67 Model 30 rocket artillery =

Type 67 Model 30 rocket launcher
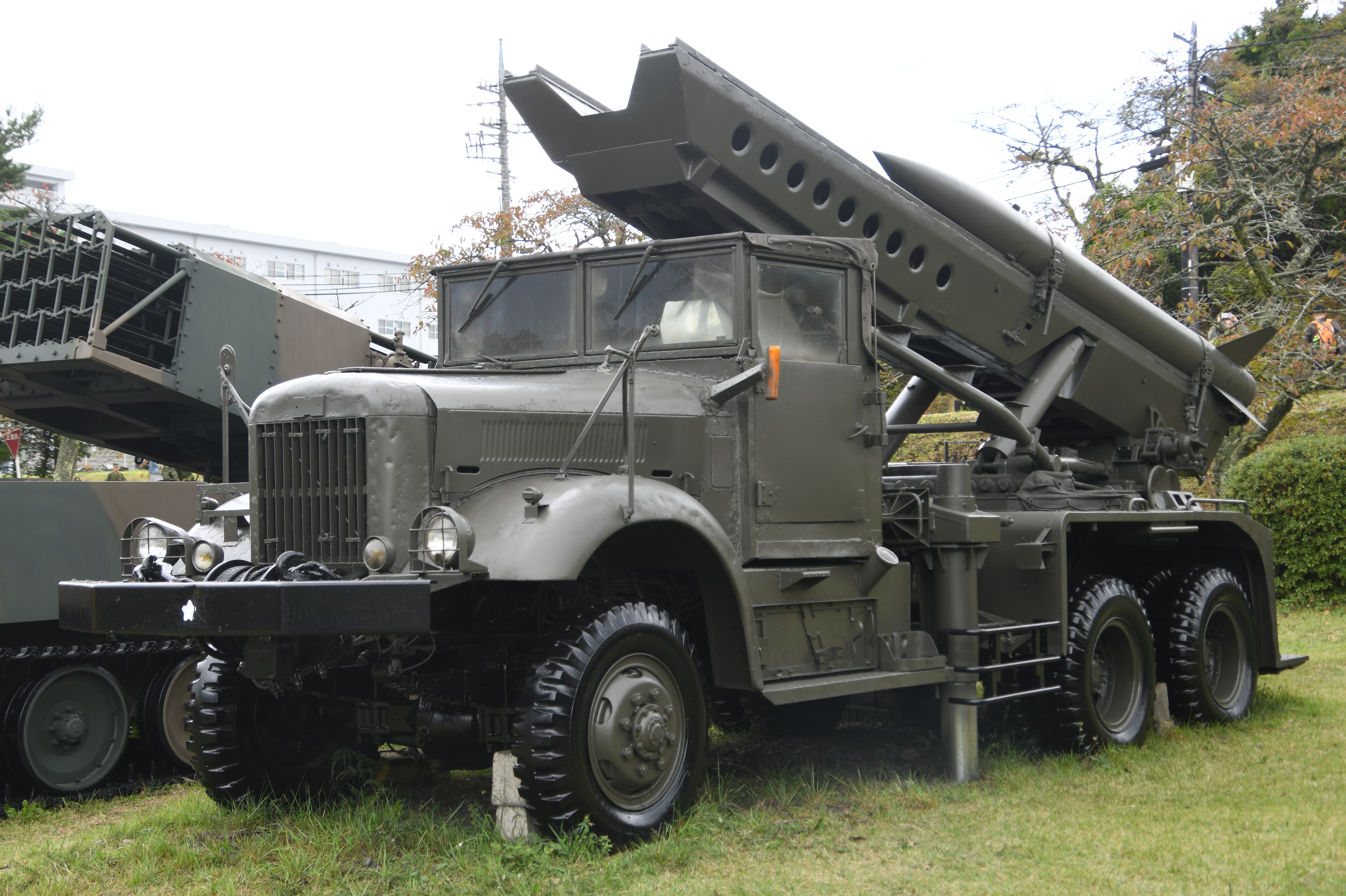
- A Type 67 Model 30 rocket launcher at Camp Fuji
- Type: Rocket artillery
- Place of origin: Japan

Service history
- In service: 1968–1993
- Used by: Japan Ground Self-Defense Force (formerly)

Production history
- Designer: Technical Research and Development Institute
- Designed: 1959–1965
- Manufacturer: Hino (chassis), Japan Steel Works (rocket launcher), Nissan (rockets)
- No. built: 48

Specifications
- Mass: 12.0 t (11.8 long tons; 13.2 short tons)
- Length: 8.24 m (27.0 ft)
- Width: 2.44 m (8 ft 0 in)
- Height: 3.35 m (11.0 ft)
- Crew: 4
- Cartridge weight: 573 kg (1,263 lb)
- Caliber: 337 mm (13.3 in)
- Muzzle velocity: 790 m/s (2,600 ft/s)
- Maximum firing range: 28,000 m (92,000 ft)
- Main armament: 337 mm rocket launcher (two rockets)
- Engine: Hino Motors diesel
- Maximum speed: 70 km/h (43 mph)

The Type 67 Model 30 rocket launcher (67式30型ロケット弾発射機 roku-go-shiki-san-jyu-gata-roketto-dan-hassha-ki) was a self-propelled rocket launcher in service in the Japan Ground Self-Defense Force. Based on a Hino six-wheel drive truck chassis, the vehicle had two rails for launching artillery rockets. Deployed operationally from 1968, 48 Type 67 Model 30 rocket launchers were built, which were retired by 1993.

== Development ==
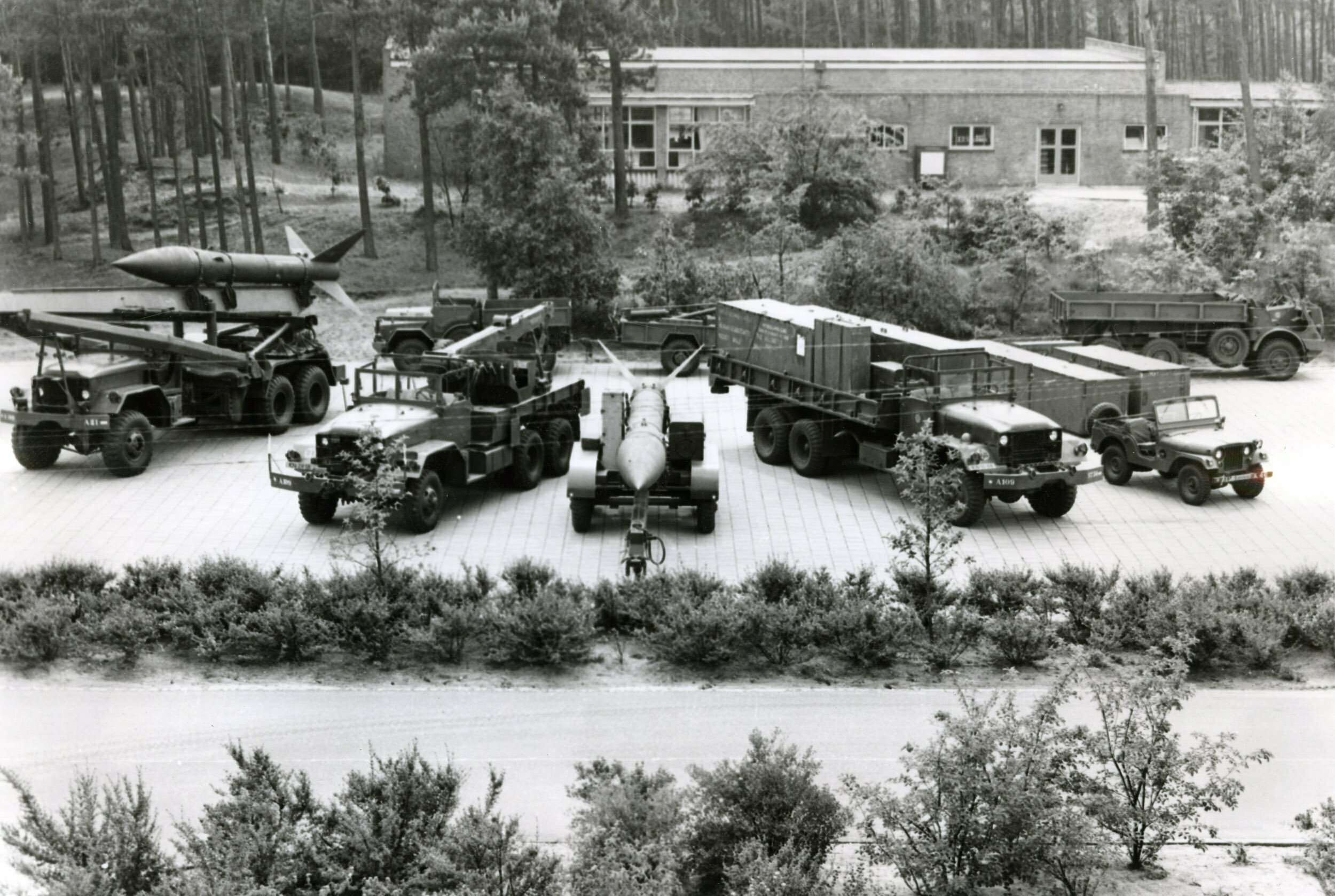
Not being able to procure the MGR-1 Honest John rocket, Japan pursued domestic development instead.

Research into developing artillery rockets in Japan started in 1955 under the auspices of the Defense Agency's Technical Research Institute. In 1957, Fuji Seiki produced a prototype rocket with a diameter of 114.3 mm (4.50 in), which underwent live fire tests. However, development was ceased due to prospective rocket deliveries from the United States.

After reluctance from the United States to supply Japan with long-range rockets, alternatives were considered. In lieu of seeking to purchase the MGR-1 Honest John, domestic development was pursued instead. In 1959, two types of rockets with diameters of 50 mm (2.0 in) and 220 mm (8.7 in) were prototyped. In 1960, it was decided to increase the rocket's diameter to 330 mm (13 in), alongside with initiating research into unit organisation and operation.

Technical testing began in 1961, for which a self-propelled rocket launcher prototype was ordered. Nissan developed the rockets and the fire control system, while Japan Steel Works was in charge of developing the launcher and loading vehicle. Prototyping continued until 1965 and the development culminated in 1968, when the rocket launcher was officially designated as the Type 67 Model 30 rocket launcher.

The Type 67 Model 30 rocket launcher entered Japan Ground Self-Defense Force service in 1968. It became the first large calibre rocket used in Japan after the Second World War and the longest-range and most powerful weapon in the Japan Ground Self-Defense Force's arsenal. First units were deployed to the Japan Ground Self-Defense Force Fuji School, subsequent units were operated by the 125th and 126th Artillery Battalions of the 1st Artillery Brigade under the Northern Army. All in all, 48 launchers were produced.

From the late 1960s, the Defense Agency began research into surface-to-ship missiles, which resulted in the Type 88 surface-to-ship missile. The 125th Artillery Battalion was disbanded in 1992 and the 126th Artillery Battalion in 1993, when the Type 67 Model 30 rocket launchers were retired. Based on the aforementioned battalions, the 1st and 2nd Surface-to-Ship Missile Regiment were formed, which operate the Type 88.

== Design ==
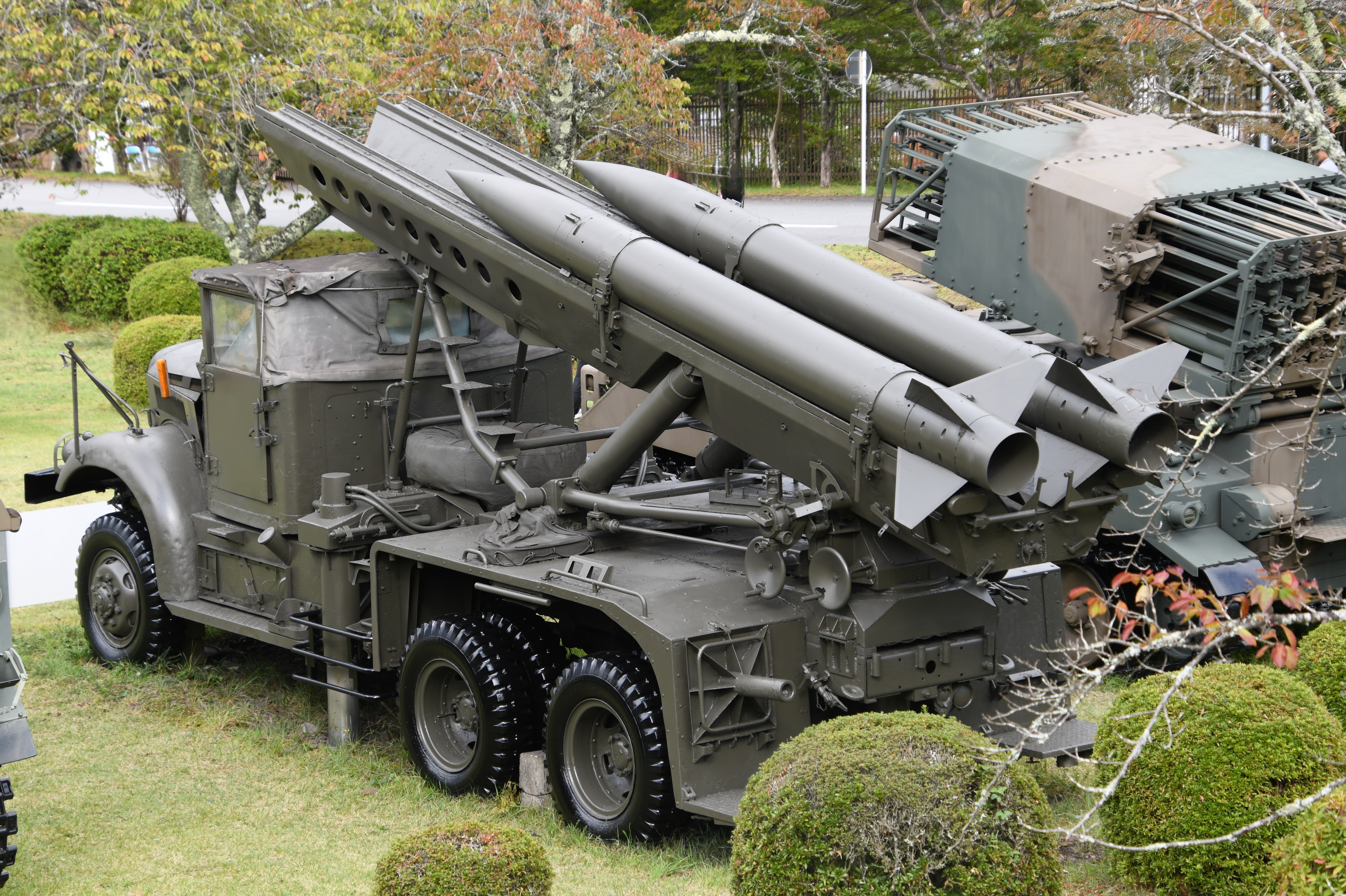
Each launcher carried two Type 68 Model 30 high-explosive or training rockets on rails.

The Type 67 Model 30 rocket launcher was based on a Hino ZC-series six-wheel drive truck. A rail-type launcher for two rockets was mounted in the rear of the chassis. The launcher was capable of elevation and limited traverse using hydraulic cylinders and employed a panoramic aiming system similar to that used in the M114 155 mm howitzer also in service with the Japan Ground Self-Defense Force.

The spin-stabilised rockets measured 4.5 m (15 ft) in length and 337 mm (13.3 in) in diameter, and had four fixed fins attached to the rear section of the rocket. A rocket in flight spun at approximately 600 revolutions per minute. After a two-second burn time, the rocket reached the velocity of 790 m/s (2,600 ft/s) and had a mazimum range of 28 km (17 mi).

Two types of rockets were available:

- The Type 68 Model 30 high-explosive rocket, which had a 227 kg (500 lb) high-explosive warhead and a total weight of 573 kg (1,263 lb).
- The Type 68 Model 30 training rocket, which had no warhead but weighed the same as the high-explosive version.

Each rocket launcher was accompanied by a Type 67 Model 30 rocket loader. Similarly to the launcher, the loader utilised a Hino ZC-series six-wheel drive truck chassis. The Type 67 Model 30 rocket loader carried six rockets and a hydraulic crane for reloading the rocket launcher.

However, the Type 67 Model 30 rocket launcher was inferior in range and warhead compared to other countries' contemporary large-calibre rockets, and the two-rocket launcher was insufficient to compensate for the low accuracy of the unguided rockets. For this reason, the Japan Ground Self-Defense Force decided to introduce multiple rocket launchers. This led to the development of the Type 75 130 mm multiple rocket launcher.

== Gallery ==
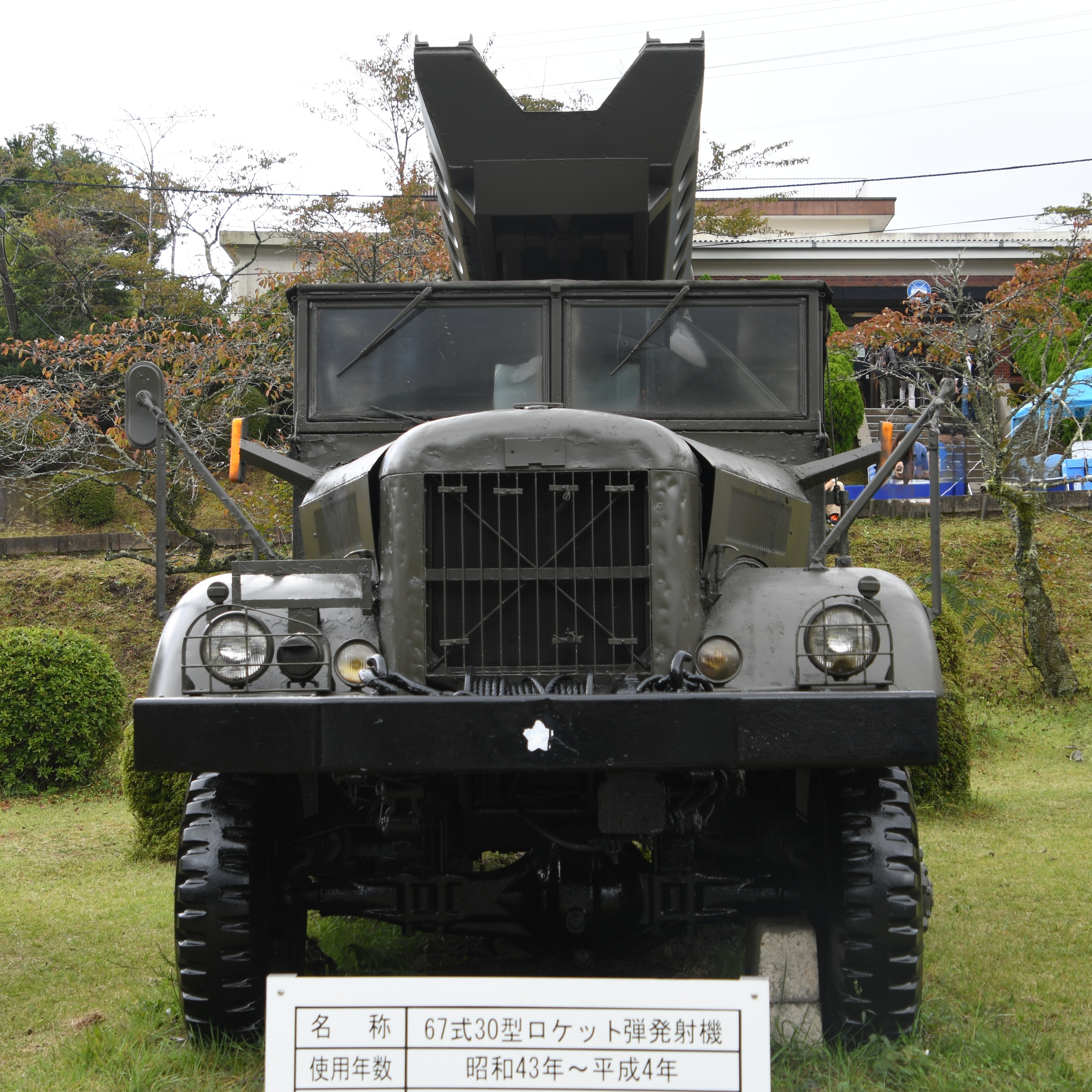
Front view of the Type 67 Model 30 at Camp Fuji

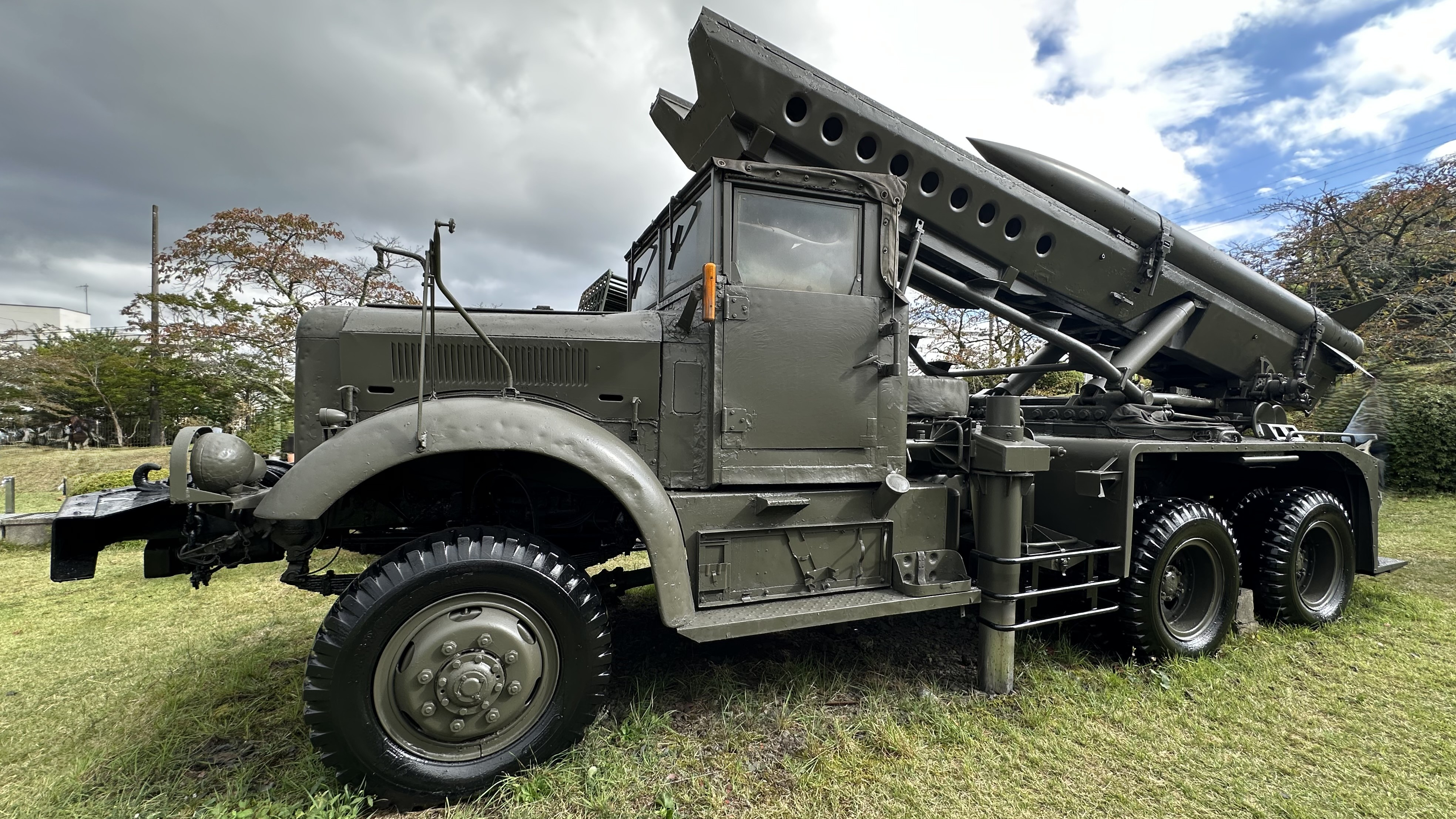
Left front view of the Type 67 Model 30 at Camp Fuji

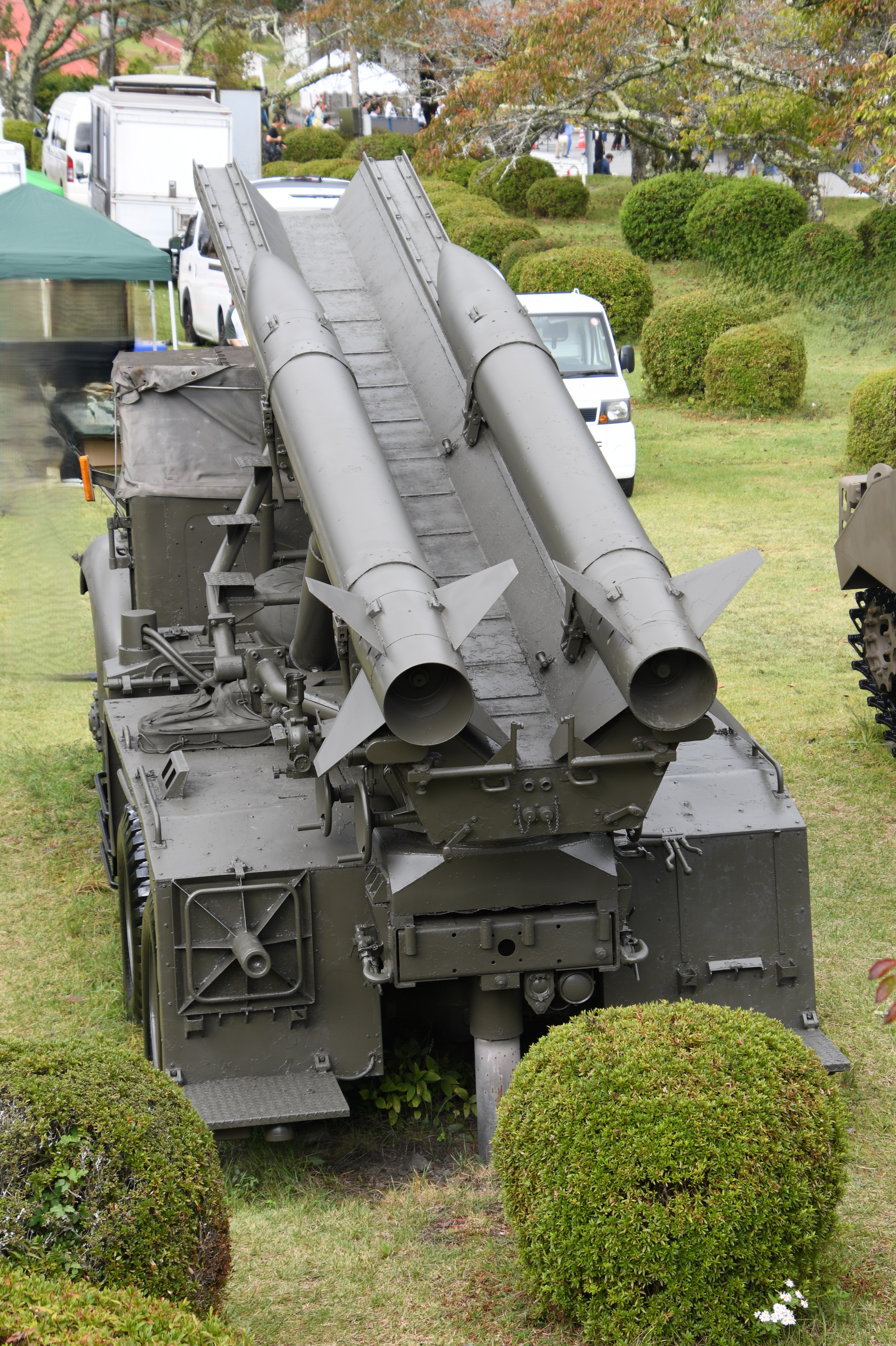
Rear view of the Type 67 Model 30 at Camp Fuji

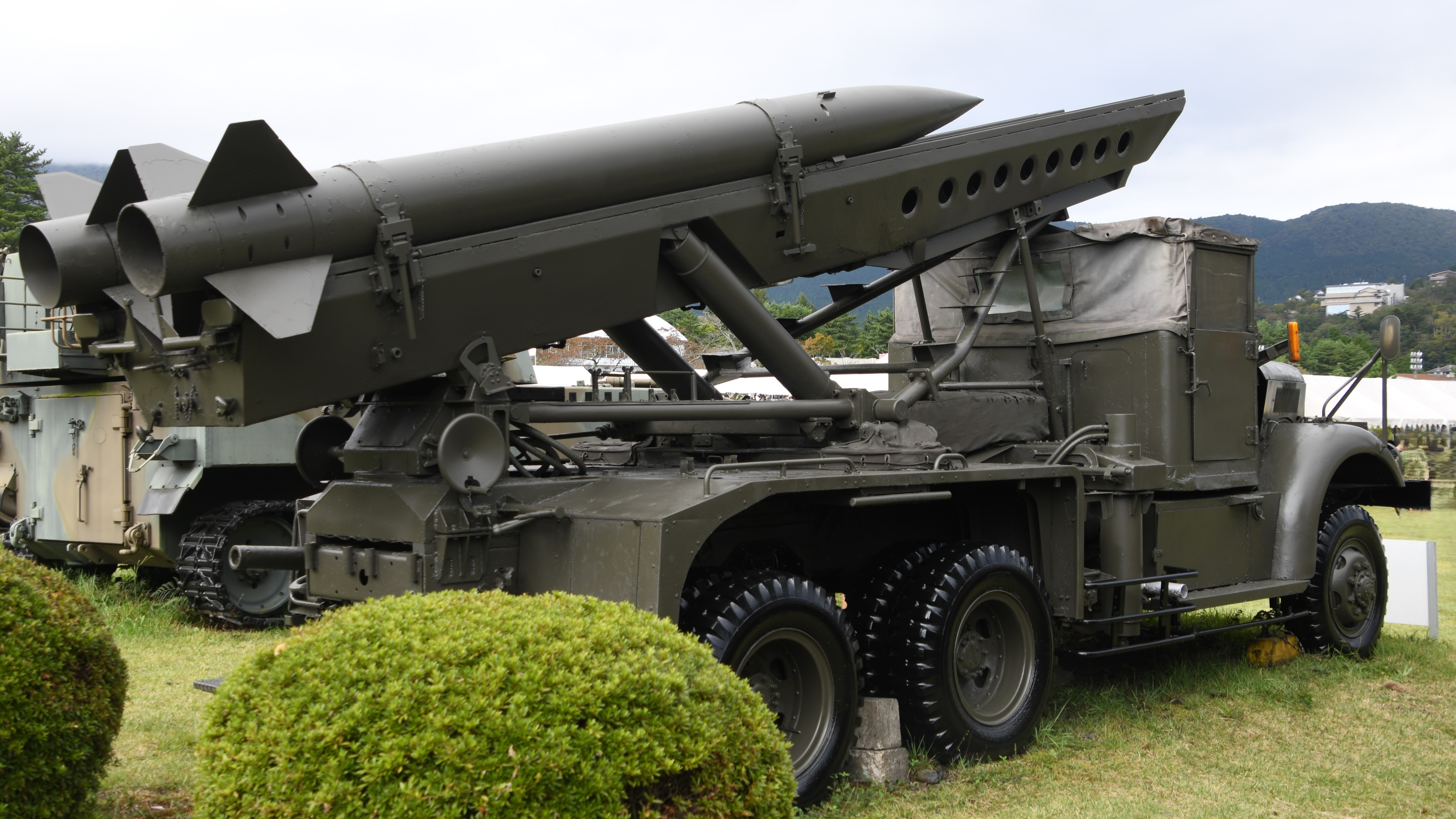
Right rear view of the Type 67 Model 30 at Camp Fuji

== See also ==
=== Rocket launchers of comparable role, configuration, and era ===
- 2K6 Luna – (Soviet Union)
- 9K52 Luna-M – (Soviet Union)
- MGR-1 Honest John – (United States)
- MGR-3 Little John – (United States)

=== Related lists ===
- List of historic, retired or reserve equipment of the Japan Ground Self-Defense Force
