= Capital Artillery Brigade =

Unit of the Republic of Korea Army

- 수도포병여단
- Capital Artillery Brigade insignia
- Active: 1 March 1974 (as Capital Corps Artillery Group); 1 December 1991 – present (as Capital Artillery Brigade)
- Country: South Korea
- Branch: Republic of Korea Army
- Type: Artillery
- Size: Brigade
- Part of: Capital Corps
- Garrison/HQ: Siheung, Gyeonggi Province
- Nickname: Loyal

Commanders
- Current commander: Brig. Gen. Lim Tae-ho

- Capital Artillery Brigade
- Hangul: 수도포병여단
- Hanja: 首都砲兵旅團
- RR: Sudo pobyeong yeodan
- MR: Sudo p'obyŏng yŏdan

The Capital Artillery Brigade (Korean: 수도포병여단; Hanja: 首都砲兵旅團) is a military formation of the Republic of Korea Army. The brigade is subordinated to the Capital Corps.

== History ==
The brigade founded as the Capital Corps Artillery Group on 1 March 1974 and changed to its current name as Capital Artillery Brigade on 1 December 1991.

The brigade headquarters is located in Siheung, Gyeonggi Province, and subordinate battalions are distributed throughout Incheon and Gimpo. The brigade headquarters is located at the rear, and subordinate battalions are located almost at the front. The size of the unit is the smallest among artillery brigades in ROKA. There are a total of five subordinate battalions and headquarters units.

== Organization ==
- Headquarters
  - 330th Target Acquisition Battalion (TPQ-74K)
  - 653rd Artillery Battalion (K9)
  - 668th Artillery Battalion (K9)
  - 669th Artillery Battalion (K9A1)
  - 757th Artillery Battalion (K239)
  - Maintenance Unit
