= GPS/INS =

Use of GPS signals to correct an inertial navigation system

GPS/INS is the use of Global Positioning System (GPS) satellite signals to correct or calibrate a solution from an inertial navigation system (INS). The method is applicable for any global navigation satellite system (GNSS)/INS system.

== Overview ==
=== GPS/INS method ===
The GPS gives an absolute drift-free position value that can be used to reset the INS solution or can be blended with it by use of a mathematical algorithm, such as a Kalman filter. The angular orientation of the unit can be inferred from the series of position updates from the GPS. The change in the error in position relative to the GPS can be used to estimate the unknown angle error.

The benefits of using GPS with an INS are that the INS may be calibrated by the GPS signals and that the INS can provide position and angle updates at a quicker rate than GPS. For high dynamic vehicles, such as missiles and aircraft, INS fills in the gaps between GPS positions. Additionally, GPS may lose its signal and the INS can continue to compute the position and angle during the period of lost GPS signal. The two systems are complementary and are often employed together.

== Applications ==
GPS/INS is commonly used on aircraft for navigation purposes. Using GPS/INS allows for smoother position and velocity estimates that can be provided at a sampling rate faster than the GPS receiver. This also allows for accurate estimation of the aircraft attitude (roll, pitch, and yaw) angles. In general, GPS/INS sensor fusion is a nonlinear filtering problem, which is commonly approached using the extended Kalman filter (EKF) or the unscented Kalman filter (UKF). The use of these two filters for GPS/INS has been compared in various sources, including a detailed sensitivity analysis. The EKF uses an analytical linearization approach using Jacobian matrices to linearize the system, while the UKF uses a statistical linearization approach called the unscented transform which uses a set of deterministically selected points to handle the nonlinearity. The UKF requires the calculation of a matrix square root of the state error covariance matrix, which is used to determine the spread of the sigma points for the unscented transform. There are various ways to calculate the matrix square root, which have been presented and compared within GPS/INS application. From this work it is recommended to use the Cholesky decomposition method.

In addition to aircraft applications, GPS/INS has also been studied for automobile applications such as autonomous navigation, vehicle dynamics control, or sideslip, roll, and tire cornering stiffness estimation. Integrating inertial navigation systems with high-precision GNSS technologies, such as real-time kinematic (RTK) and precise point positioning (PPP), enhances the accuracy of autonomous vehicle navigation by providing high-precision localization.

== See also ==
- GNSS augmentation
