= K136 Kooryong =

South Korean multiple rocket launcher

K136 Kooryong 구룡 다연장 로켓 Guryong Dayeonjang Rocket
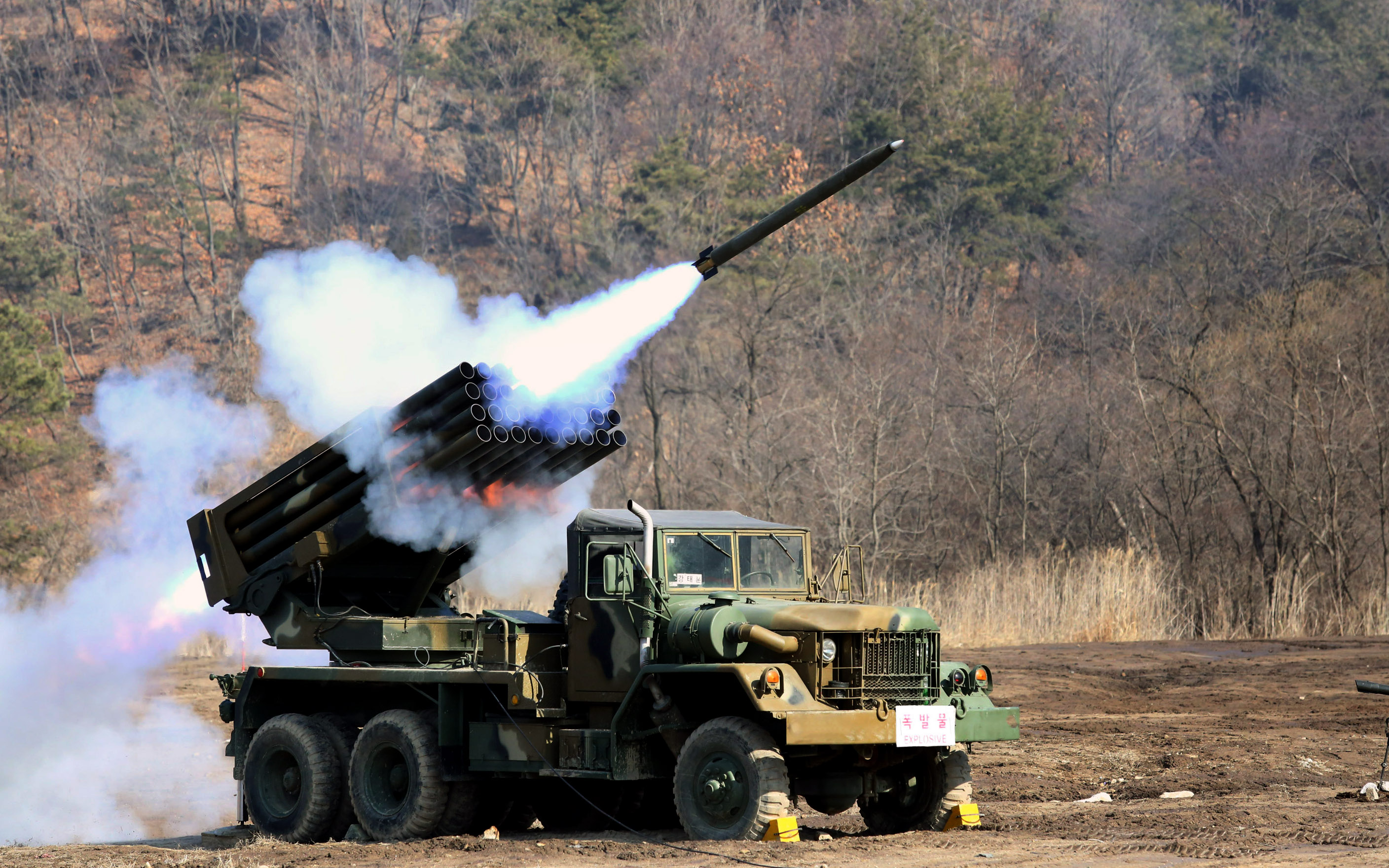
- Type: Multiple rocket launcher
- Place of origin: South Korea

Service history
- In service: K136: 1981–1987; K136A1: 1987–present

Production history
- Designer: Agency for Defense Development (launcher); Hanwha Group (rocket)
- Designed: 1973-1978
- Manufacturer: Daewoo Heavy Industries

Specifications
- Mass: 16.4 t (18.1 short tons)
- Length: 7.7 m (25 ft)
- Width: 2.5 m (8.2 ft)
- Height: 2.9 m (9.5 ft)
- Caliber: 130 mm 36×1 (K30); 131 mm 36×1 (K33); 130 mm 36×1 (K37); 130 mm 36×1 (K38)
- Rate of fire: 36 rds/in 18 sec
- Effective firing range: 23 km (K30); 36 km (K33); 22 km (K37); 30 km (K38)
- Maximum speed: 80 km/h (50 mph)

The K136 Kooryong (Romanization: K136 'Gu-ryong'; Hangul: K136 '구룡'; Hanja: K136 '九龍') is a South Korean rocket artillery system that was deployed in 1981.

== History ==
K136 Kooryong northwest island maritime firing exercise of South Korean Army

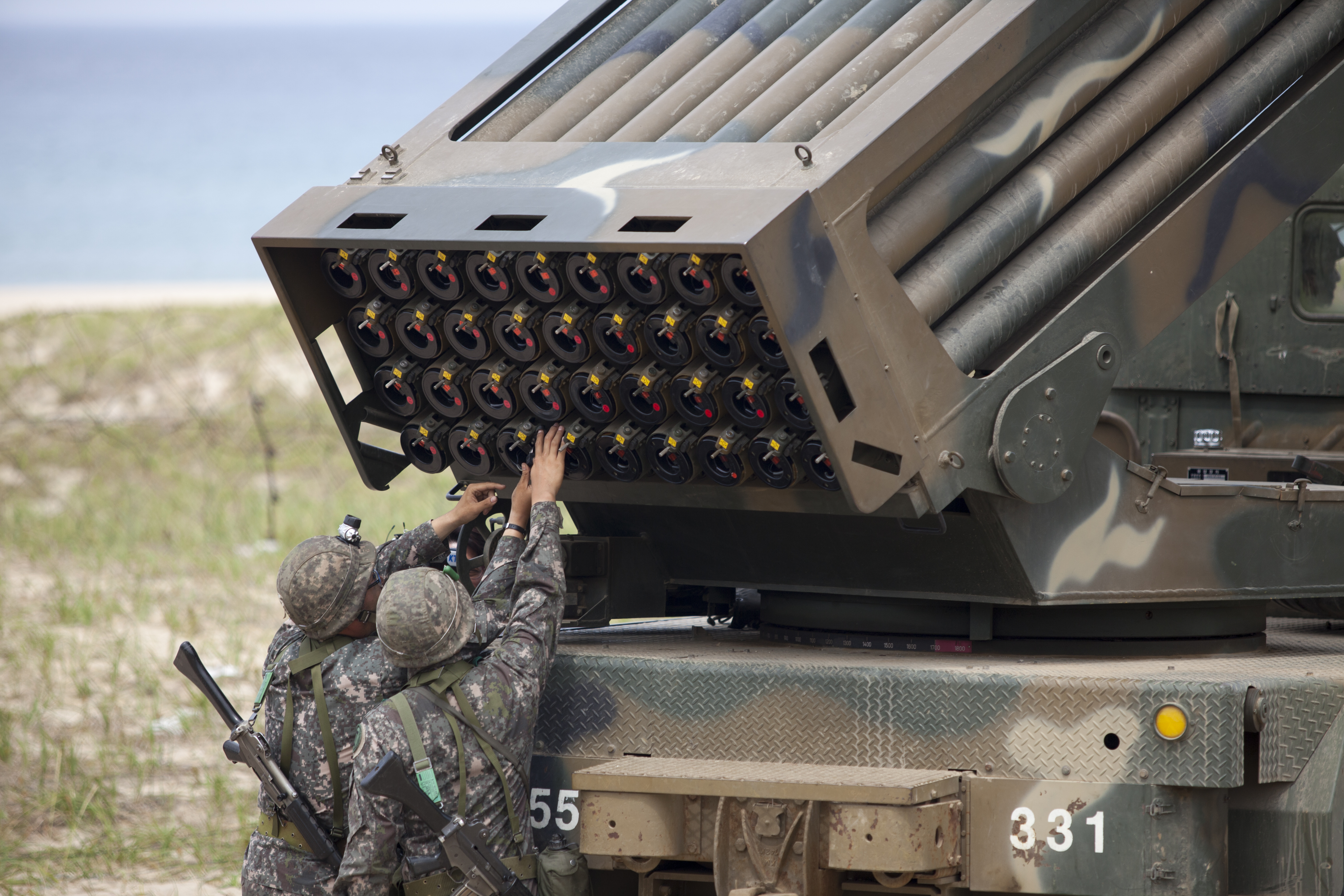
Firing Exercise Multiple Rocket Launcher, Republic of Korea Army 8th Corps.

The development of the K136 Kooryong multiple rocket launcher (MRL) began in 1973 at the Agency for Defense Development (ADD) as a means of responding to the BM-21 122 mm multiple rocket launcher possessed by North Korea, and was performance tested in 1978, and the K136 was deployed in 1981. Later, the improved K136A1, which added a stainless steel launch tube and hydraulic system, was deployed to the South Korean Army from 1987 to 1991, and the K33 and K38 rockets with ranges of 36 km and 30 km were developed in 1988. Called Kooryong, the weapons system was designed, tested, and manufactured in Korea for field artillery and artillery. Daewoo Heavy Industries is in charge of production and the rocket was developed by Hanwha.

=== Possible transfer to the Philippine Army ===
The Philippine Army has negotiated with the South Korean government for the transfer of its MLRS launchers for the newly activated MLRS Battalions of the Army Artillery Regiment. Three batteries of K136 Kooryong MLRS from South Korea were expected to be delivered in 2020. Delivery of the units has been delayed several times.

== Design ==
The multiple rocket launcher has 36 tubes and fires K30 130 mm and K33 131 mm rockets. There are also improved K37 rockets with high explosive warheads for better performance and pre-fragmented HE K37 rockets with warheads containing 16,000 steel balls. The launcher is carried on a KM809AL 6x6 truck.

== Operators ==
- South Korea: About 150 units were built.
- Egypt: About 36 units were purchased in 2004.

=== Failed bids ===
- Philippines: Four batteries worth of units were expected to be delivered with three batteries to be established under the Philippine Army and one under the Philippine Marine Corps with two of the batteries obtained through a donation from South Korea. However, in 2023, Philippines stopped pursuing the procurement of South Korea's reserve K136 Kooryong systems and decided to instead focus on acquiring a more modern system. The K239 Chunmoo, which is the successor of the older K136 Kooryong, is one of the three systems participating in the new MLRS procurement program.

== See also ==
- K239 Chunmoo - South Korean multiple launch rocket system (MLRS) developed to replace K136 Kooryong.
