= HMTA =

HMTA could refer to:

- Heavy Metal - Tungsten Alloy - a tungsten alloy used in dense inert metal explosive bombs.
- The organic compound hexamethylenetetramine, also called methenamine or hexamine when used as a medication.
- Hazardous Materials Transportation Act (1975)
