= GBU-39 Small Diameter Bomb =

American precision-guided glide bomb

GBU-39/B Small Diameter Bomb
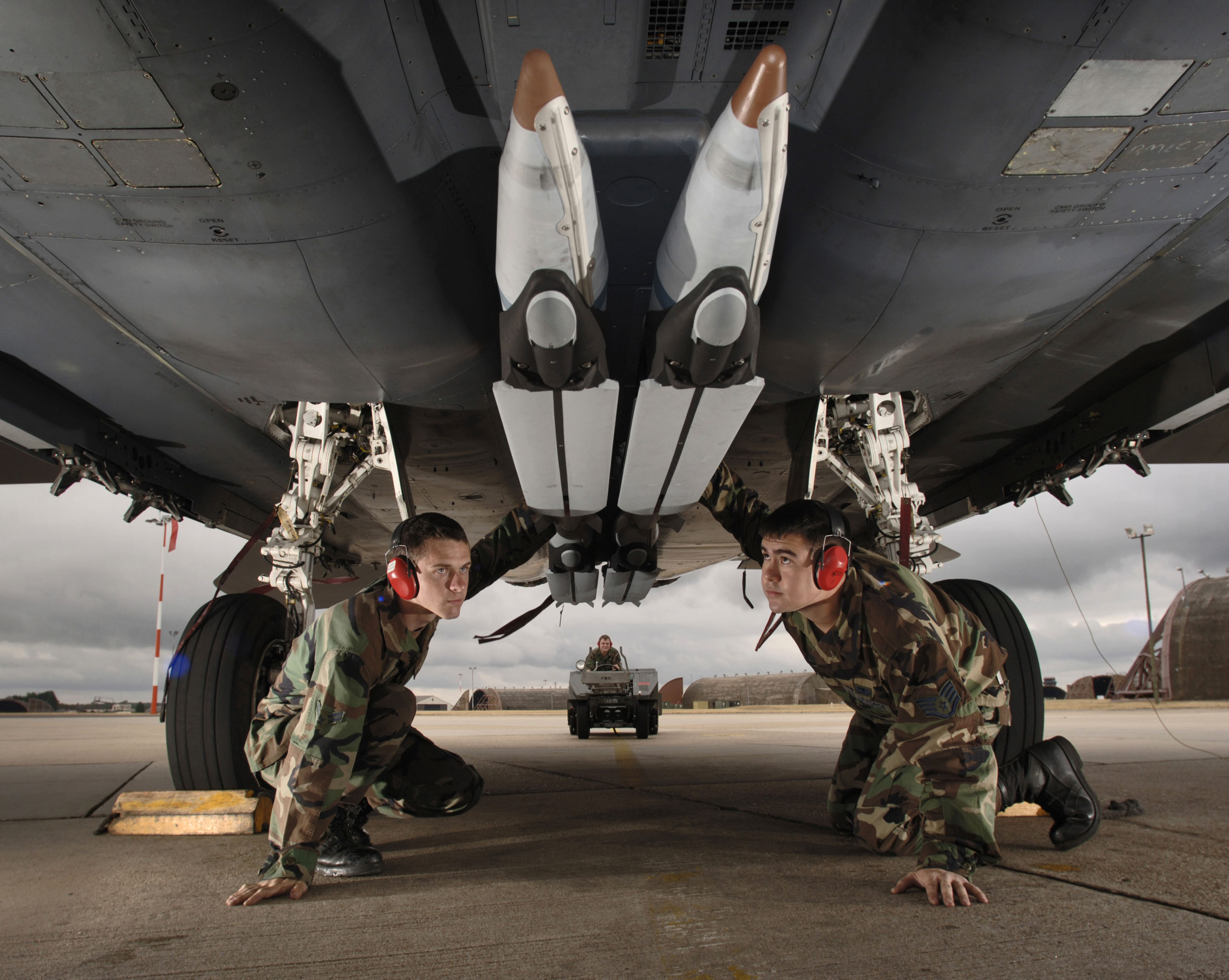
- Four SDBs (training/ground handling variant) loaded on an U.S. Air Force F-15E Strike Eagle at RAF Lakenheath, Suffolk, U.K. in August 2006
- Type: Glide bomb
- Place of origin: United States

Service history
- In service: 2006–present
- Used by: United States; Israel; Italy; Netherlands; Ukraine; Saudi Arabia; Australia
- Wars: War in Afghanistan, Iraq War, Military intervention against ISIL, Syrian Civil War, Russian invasion of Ukraine, Gaza war

Production history
- Manufacturer: Boeing Integrated Defense Systems
- Unit cost: US$40,000 (SDB I, FY 2021)
- Produced: 2005–present
- No. built: 17,000+
- Variants: GBU-39/B; GBU-39A/B; GBU-39B/B

Specifications
- Mass: 285 lb (129 kg)
- Length: 70.8 in (1.80 m)
- Width: 5 ft 3.3 in (1.61 m) (wings extended); 7.5 in (190 mm) packed
- Warhead: SDB I (GBU-39/B) penetrating blast fragmentation, penetrating steel nosecone SDB FLM (GBU-39A/B) blast ultra-low fragmentation Laser SDB (GBU-39B/B) penetrating blast fragmentation, w/o steel nosecone
- Warhead weight: All SDB I variants 206 lb (93 kg) total SDB I (GBU-39/B); Explosive fill: 36 lb (16 kg) AFX 757 Insensitive munition certified PBX; Penetration: greater than 3 ft (0.91 m) of steel reinforced concrete SDB FLM (GBU-39A/B); 137 lb (62 kg) AFX 1209 MBX ("multiphase blast explosive"), composite case Laser SDB (GBU-39B/B); 36 lb (16 kg) AFX 757 enhanced blast insensitive explosive, penetrating steel case
- Operational range: All SDB I variants over 60 nmi (69 mi; 111 km) when air-dropped, 150 km (93 mi; 81 nmi) when launched as a part of the GLSDB,
- Guidance system: SDB I (GBU-39/B); SDB FLM (GBU-39A/B); GPS / INS; Laser SDB (GBU-39B/B); GPS / INS with terminal semi-active laser guidance
- Accuracy: SDB I (GBU-39); 3 ft (1 m) CEP

The GBU-39/B Small Diameter Bomb (SDB) is a 250-pound (110 kg) precision-guided glide bomb that is intended to allow aircraft to carry a greater number of smaller, more accurate bombs. Most US Air Force aircraft will be able to carry (using the BRU-61/A rack) a pack of four SDBs in place of a single 2,000-pound (910 kg) Mark 84 bomb. It first entered service in 2006. The Ground Launched Small Diameter Bomb (GLSDB) was later developed to enable the SDB to be launched from a variety of ground launchers and configurations.

== Description ==
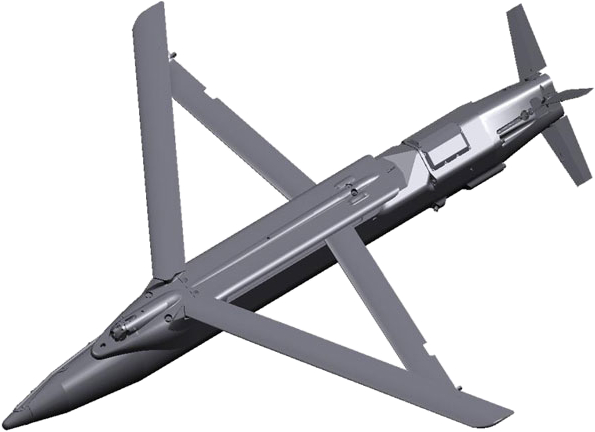
The GBU-39 Small Diameter Bomb

The original SDB is equipped with a GPS-aided inertial navigation system to attack fixed/stationary targets such as fuel depots, bunkers, etc. The second variant, Raytheon's GBU-53/B SDB II, will include a thermal seeker and radar with automatic target recognition features for striking mobile targets such as tanks, vehicles, and mobile command posts.

The small size of the bomb allows a strike aircraft to carry more of them than previously available bombs, and thus strike more targets. The SDB carries approximately 36 lb (16 kg) of AFX-757 high explosive. AFX-757 is an insensitive enhanced blast polymer-bonded explosive, containing 25% RDX high explosive, 30% ammonium perchlorate oxidizer, 33% aluminium powder, 4.44% HTPB binder and 6.56% dioctyl adipate plasticizer. AFX-757 has improved air blast equivalent, 1.39 times more than Composition B, but low brisance due to low RDX content. It has integrated "DiamondBack" type wings which deploy after release, increasing the glide time and therefore the maximum range. Its size and accuracy allow for an effective munition with less collateral damage. Warhead penetration is 3 ft (1 m) of steel reinforced concrete under 3 ft (1 m) of earth and the fuze has electronic safe and fire (ESAF) cockpit selectable functions, including air burst and delayed options.

The SDB I has a circular error probable (CEP) precision of 3 ft (1 m). CEP is reduced by updating differential GPS offsets prior to weapon release. These offsets are calculated using an SDB Accuracy Support Infrastructure, consisting of three or more GPS receivers at fixed locations transmitting calculated location to a correlation station at the theatre Air Operations Center. The corrections are then transmitted by Link 16 to SDB-equipped aircraft.

=== Alternative guidance and warheads ===
In November 2014, the U.S. Air Force began the development of a version of the SDB I intended to track and attack sources of electronic warfare jamming directed to disrupt the munitions' guidance. The home-on-GPS jam (HOG-J) seeker works similar to the AGM-88 HARM to follow the source of a radio-frequency jammer to destroy it.

In January 2016, the Air Force awarded a contract to Scientific Systems Co. Inc. to demonstrate the company's ImageNav technology, a vision-based navigation and precision targeting system that compares a terrain database with the host platform's sensor to make course corrections. ImageNav technology has demonstrated target geo-location and navigation precision within three meters.

In January 2016, Orbital ATK revealed that the Alternative Warhead (AW), designed for the M270's GMLRS to achieve area effects without leaving behind unexploded ordnance, had been successfully tested on the SDB.

== Development ==
In 2002, while Boeing and Lockheed Martin were competing to develop the Small Diameter Bomb, Darleen A. Druyun – at that time Principal Deputy Assistant Secretary of the Air Force for Acquisition and Management – deleted the requirement for moving target engagement, which favored Boeing. She was later convicted of violating a conflict of interest statute.

In May 2009, Raytheon announced that it had completed its first test flight of the GBU-53/B Small Diameter Bomb II, which has a data link and a tri-mode seeker built with technology developed for the Precision Attack Missile. In August 2010 the U.S. Air Force awarded a $450 million contract for engineering and development.

Although unit costs were somewhat uncertain as of 2006, the estimated cost for the INS/GPS version was around US$70,000. Boeing and the Italian firm Oto Melara signed a contract covering the license production of 500 GBU-39/B (INS/GPS) and 50 BRU-61/A racks for the Aeronautica Militare, at a cost of nearly US$34 million.

=== Timeline ===
- October 2001 – Boeing is awarded an SDB development contract in addition to Lockheed Martin to compete to become the prime contractor.
- 2003 - was already described as possible munition on the battlefield at the specialized press
- April 2005 – Boeing awarded the contract as Prime Contractor, beating Lockheed Martin.
- September 2005 – Small Diameter Bomb certified for operational test, and evaluation.
- September 2006 – The SDB team delivered the first SDBs to the USAF.
- October 2006 – Initial Operational Capability declared for SDB on the F-15E Strike Eagle.
- October 2006 – First use in combat.
- February 2008 – 1,000th SDB I and first 50 FLM delivered.
- September 2008 – Israel received approval from the US Congress to purchase 1,000 bombs.
- December 2008 – Reportedly used against Hamas facilities in the Gaza Strip, including underground rocket launchers.
- January 2009 – Unnamed Boeing official stated that they have yet to deliver any SDBs to Israel.
- June 2010 – FMS request by the Netherlands for 603 units and support equipment valued at US$44 million.
- August 2010 – U.S. Air Force selects Raytheon over Boeing for the GBU-53/B for Small Diameter Bomb II Program.
- 2011 – Boeing begins the development of Laser SDB I, utilizing the same laser from the Laser JDAM to keep costs down.
- 2014 – Work begins on home-on-GPS jam.
- 2014 – U.S. Special Operations Command began fielding the Laser SDB.
- April 2016 – FMS request by Australia for 2,950 units and support equipment valued at US$386 million.

== Aircraft ==
The GBU-39/B began separation tests on the F-22 Raptor in early September 2007, after more than a year of sometimes difficult work to integrate the weapon in the weapons bay and carry out airborne captive carry tests.

The SDB is integrated on the F-15E Strike Eagle, Panavia Tornado, JAS-39 Gripen, F-16 Fighting Falcon, F-22 Raptor and AC-130W. Future integration is planned for the F-35 Lightning II, A-10 Thunderbolt II, B-1 Lancer, B-2 Spirit, B-52 Stratofortress and AC-130J. Other aircraft, including UCAVs, may also receive the necessary upgrades. The General Atomics MQ-20 Avenger is also planned to carry the weapon.

Evidence appeared in May 2024 that Ukraine has modified MiG-29AS fighters to carry eight GBU-39/B. The Ukrainian Air Force has used air-dropped Small Diameter Bombs since November 2023. The air-dropped Small Diameter Bomb "has proved resilient to jamming” and has a “nearly 90 percent" accuracy rate. Previously Ukraine had operated the GLSDB ground-launched version of the Small Diameter Bomb, which was regarded "ineffective" due to Russian jamming. They are also harder to intercept due to their small size. This small size, combined with being air-launched, means that the SDB might hit a target before Russian electronic warfare can jam the weapon. The GLSDB has a "parabolic flight path" of artillery fire that can be detected on radar.

== Variants ==
=== GBU-39A/B – SDB Focused Lethality Munition (FLM) ===
Under a contract awarded in September 2006, Boeing developed a version of the SDB I that replaces the steel casing with a lightweight composite casing and the warhead with a focused-blast explosive such as dense inert metal explosive (DIME). This should further reduce collateral damage when using the weapon for pinpoint strikes in urban areas. The USAF intends to use the same FLM casing on a weapon of 500 pounds (227 kg). Boeing celebrated the delivery of the first 50 FLM weapons on 28 February 2008 and delivered the last of the 500 FLMs under contract in December 2013.

=== GBU-39B/B – Laser SDB ===
In 2011 Boeing began testing on a laser-guided version of the baseline SDB, integrating the same Semi Active Laser (SAL) from the GBU-54 Laser JDAM. Boeing claimed to have successfully hit targets moving at 30 mph (48.3 km/h) and 50 mph (80.5 km/h).

In mid-2012, the U.S. Senate recommended zeroing out funding for the GBU-53/B SDB II due to fielding delays with the F-35 Lightning II. Commenting on the delay of the SDB II, Debbie Rub, Boeing's VP & GM of Missiles and Unmanned Airborne Systems said, “Until that [SDB II] comes online ... this is a nice gap filler to take care of an important warfighting need," stating that Boeing could fill the gap in capability at a fraction of the cost; "As we think about the fiscal constraints that we’re under and DoD is under, it's the right kind of answer where you get an 80 percent solution at a fraction of the cost.”

In June 2013, Boeing secured a contract for the development and testing of the LSDB. Under the contract Boeing was to provide engineering, integration test, and production support, plus the development of an LSDB Weapon Simulator. According to Boeing, the LSDB can be constructed at a more economical cost compared to the planned Raytheon GBU-53/B SDB II, leveraging the same semi-active laser sensor as the JDAM to effectively target moving and maritime targets. However, Boeing admitted to a capability gap in the ability to engage targets in zero-visibility weather, lacking the millimeter wave radar of the GBU-53/B SDB II. In 2014, U.S. Special Operations Command began fielding the Laser SDB.

== Operational history ==
It was reported that Israel used a GBU-39/B SDB during the strike that killed 45 civilians in a Rafah refugee tent camp on May 26, 2024. A subsequent investigation by Amnesty International said the attack was "likely to have constituted a disproportionate and indiscriminate attack, and should be investigated as a war crime." The investigation also confirmed that Hamas and PIJ militants were located in the internally-displaced persons’ camp, a location which displaced people believed was a designated 'humanitarian zone', with "fighters knowingly endangering the lives of civilians." Although the GBU-39 is specifically designed to limit collateral damage, former Army EOD technician Trevor Ball stated that Israel had better options when civilians were nearby.

According to CNN, Israel also used a GBU-39/B SDB in a strike at the gate of the Al-Mutanabbi school complex near Khan Younis in Southern Gaza, which was being used to house displaced people. The IDF stated that the strike was targeted against a Hamas militant, while the Palestinian Ministry of Health reported at least 27 killed and 53 injured in the strike.

In August 2024, CNN reported that Israel used the GBU/39 again in the Al-Tabaeen school attack, killing over 90 people according to the Gaza Civil Defense. The IDF stated that it was a precision strike against a Hamas command and control center that killed at least 19 Hamas and PIJ militants.

Open Source Munitions Portal researchers identified the GBU-39 as the munition used in a June 10, 2026, United States airstrike on drinking water storage facility near Bemani village in Hormozgan Province, Iran. Local water officials said the strike left 20,000 residents temporarily without water supplies in high summer heat, but service was soon restored. New York Times investigators described the damage as consistent with a precision strike.

== Operators ==
=== Current operators ===
- Australia: The sale of up to 2,950 GBU-39 (SDB 1), and 50 guided test vehicles with GBU-39 (T-1)/B (inert fuze) for an estimated cost of $386 million was approved in April 2016. Delivery to the RAAF was made in 2019.
- Israel: In 2012 Israel purchased munitions from the United States at a total value of $1.879 billion, which included 3,450 GBU-39/B (SDB 1), plus 4,100 GBU-39/B purchased in 2015 as part of another munitions purchase.
- Italy: In 2010 Italian company OTO Melara signed a $34 million contract with Boeing to manufacture the SDB-1 for the Italian Air Force.
- Netherlands: In 2010 the Netherlands purchased 603 GBU-39 (SDB 1) for an estimated cost of $44 million.
- Saudi Arabia: In October 2013, Saudi Arabia purchased various munitions from the US, including 1,000 GBU-39 (SDB 1). In Dec 2020 a request to purchase 3,000 GBU-39 (SDB 1) was approved by the US Government.
- South Korea: In 2013 South Korea made two purchases of the GBU-39, as part of a purchase of weapons for F-15 SE including 542 GBU-39/B and weapons for the F-35 aircraft, of another 542 GBU-39/B.
- Sweden: In 2019, Sweden ordered the GBU-39, to be deployed from the JAS 39 Gripen.
- Ukraine: Ukrainian Air Force
- United States: the United States is the major operator of the GBU-39 (SDB 1).

=== Future operators ===
- Bahrain: In 2019 the Bahraini Government purchased as part of sale of several weapons for the Royal Bahraini Air Force's F-16 aircraft fleet 100 GBU-39/B (SDB 1).
- Bulgaria: In 2019 Bulgaria agreed to purchase 8 F-16C/D Block 70/72 aircraft with 28 GBU-39 (SDB 1) and other munitions. By 2020 Bulgaria had paid 100% of the $1.673 billion cost, however delivery is not expected until 2026. In 2022 Bulgaria was approved to purchase another 8 F-16 C/D Block 70 aircraft, with another 28 GBU-39 (SDB 1), for the same cost.
- Canada: On December 4 2025 the United States Department of State approved the possible sale of up to 6,062 GBU-39s of various types to Canada.
- Finland: Finland chose SDB I and SDB II guided bombs along with F-35s.
- India: 310 GBU-39B/B laser-guided Small Diameter Bombs (SDB) and 8 GBU-39B/B LSDB guided test vehicles with live fuses acquired as part of 31 MQ-9 Reaper deal.
- Morocco: On December 20, 2024, the United States approved a possible sale of 500 GBU-39Bs and related equipment to Morocco for an estimated $86 million.
- NATO: In 2022, a request by NATO to purchase precision-guided munitions, including 279 GBU-39/B (SDB 1) was approved by the US Government.
- Norway Norway is acquiring 816 Boeing GBU-39/B SDB guided bombs from USA.
- Portugal: Portuguese Air Force is procuring GBU-39/B bombs through the Ammunition Support Partnership.
- Romania: Romanian Air Force is procuring 400 GBU-39B bombs and two GBU-39 (T-1)/B inert practice bombs with fuze. The estimated total cost is $84 million.
- Turkey: In 2024, the US approved to sell GBU-39/B to Turkey
- United Arab Emirates: In 2013 a request to purchase 5,000 GBU-39/B (SDB 1) as part of a sale of various munitions was approved. In 2020 request to purchase another 2,500 GBU-39/B (SDB 1) was accepted.
- Poland:On May 21 2025 the United States Department of State approved the possible sale of 1,400 GBU-39/B to Poland.

== See also ==
- Extended Range Attack Munition
- GBU-53/B StormBreaker – Precision-guided laser bomb, formerly called Small Diameter Bomb II. US Air Force selected Raytheon over Boeing to develop the SDB II.
- Spice (bomb) – Israeli precision bomb convertible unguided to guided
- S8000 Banderol - Small Russian air launched cruise missile
