= Ground Launched Small Diameter Bomb =

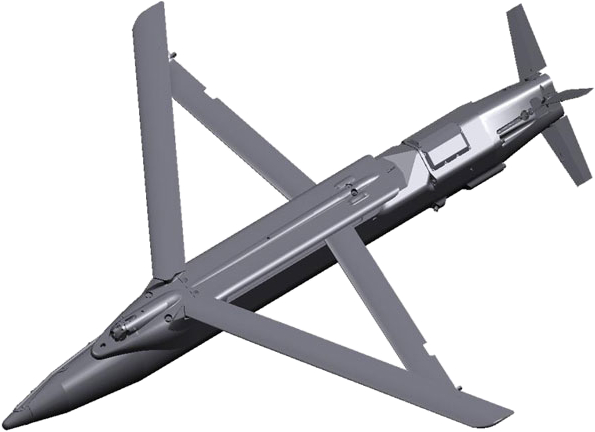
- The GBU-39 Small Diameter Bomb
- Type: Glide bomb Surface-to-surface missile

Service history
- Wars: Russo-Ukrainian War

Production history
- Designer: Boeing & Saab Group
- Designed: 2015–2019
- Produced: 2023

Specifications
- Mass: 600 lb (270 kg)
- Length: 12 ft 10 in (3.91 m); SDB length is 5 ft 11 in (1.80 m)
- Diameter: 9 1/2 in (240 mm); SDB packed height is 7.75 in (197 mm); SDB packed width is 7.5 in (190 mm)
- Wingspan: 5 ft 3.3 in (1.61 m); 7.5 in (190 mm) packed
- Warhead: Fragmentation multipurpose warhead
- Warhead weight: 93 kg (205 lb); Explosive fill: 16 kg (35 lb) AFX-757 Insensitive munition certified PBX; Penetration: greater than 3 ft (0.91 m) of steel reinforced concrete
- Engine: M26 rocket motor
- Operational range: 150 km (93 mi)
- Guidance system: GPS supported INS
- Accuracy: 3 ft 3 in (1 m) CEP
- Launch platform: M270 MLRS; M142 HIMARS; Or can be launched from its own launch container
- References: Janes

The Ground Launched Small Diameter Bomb (GLSDB) is a weapon developed by Boeing and the Saab Group to allow Boeing's GBU-39 Small Diameter Bomb (SDB), originally created for use by aircraft, to be ground-launched from a variety of launchers and configurations. It combines the SDB with the M26 rocket, enabling it to be launched from ground-based missile systems such as the M270 Multiple Launch Rocket System and M142 HIMARS.

The weapon started initial mass production in 2023 and saw its first combat deployment by Ukraine in 2024 during the Russian invasion of the country. The performance was reportedly disappointing due to Russia's electromagnetic warfare capabilities, along with deficiencies in tactics, techniques, and procedures.

== Design ==
Boeing, in partnership with Saab, developed an "inter-stage adapter" to connect the SDB to an M26 rocket. Also providing expertise are the Norwegian-Finnish company Nammo (booster rocket) and the Norwegian company Nordic Shelter (launchers). The advantage of the M26 is that there is an abundant stockpile of these rockets. Production of these rockets ceased in 2001, when 506,718 rockets had been produced. As of 2004, 439,194 remained in total inventory. By 2007, the Army was paying to destroy them. The original ordnance carried by the M26 did not meet the terms of the Convention on Cluster Munitions (not signed by the United States). Although the GLSDB can be launched from either MLRS or HIMARS, it also comes with its own launcher, which resembles an undistinguished 20-foot (6.1 m) shipping container, making it easier to create decoys and more difficult for the enemy to locate and target. After the rocket motor launches it to a high enough altitude and speed, the SDB separates from the rocket and the wings deploy, allowing the bomb to glide to its target. The GLSDB carries a smaller warhead, with about one-third less explosives than is delivered with the existing M31 rocket, depending on the type (16 kg (35 lb) vs 23 kg (51 lb)). While typical rockets from multiple launch rocket systems (MLRS) follow a ballistic trajectory, the rocket-launched SDB can be launched to altitude and glide on a selected trajectory. Twelve M26 rockets at a time can be launched from MLRS, six at a time from HIMARS.

Boeing and Saab Group conducted three successful GLSDB tests in February 2015. Unlike traditional artillery weapons, the GLSDB offers 360-degree coverage for high and low angles of attack, flying around terrain to hit targets on the back of mountains, or circling back around to a target behind the launch vehicle. The GLSDB has a range of 150 km (93 mi), or can hit targets 70 km (43 mi) behind the launch vehicle. The weapon can be set to detonate above the ground or with a delay for deep penetration.

In a 2017 demonstration, the GLSDB engaged a moving target at a distance of 100 km (62 mi). The SDB and rocket motor separated at altitude and the bomb used a semi-active laser (SAL) seeker to track and engage the target. The laser-guided SDB had previously been tested successfully using targets travelling at 50 miles per hour (80 km/h).

The cost is undisclosed. However, the SDB used in GLSDB has a cost to the U.S. military of about $40,000, with the accompanying M26 rocket coming from obsolete inventory. The amount to be allocated to each GLSDB of the cost of the "inter-stage adapter", the cost to develop a launcher-container, and the other GLSDB development and production costs of Boeing and Saab is unknown. For comparison purposes, the cost of a single M31 rocket is estimated at $500,000, though this may be the "export price", always higher than the amount charged to the U.S. Army. According to the U.S. Army's budget, it will pay about $168,000 for each GMLRS in 2023. The GLSDB is being offered to Ukraine as a long distance alternative to the 300 km (190 mi) ATACMS missiles, which have a price per unit estimated to be well over $1 million. The other long distance alternative is the 250 km (160 mi) Storm Shadow missiles, each of which is estimated to cost around £2 million ($2.5 million, fiscal year 2023). The U.K. has agreed to supply these to Ukraine. The purpose in developing the weapons was to offer poorer countries the strike capacity of more expensive and advanced air forces.

Unlike conventional artillery that follows a predictable path from launch to destination, the wings and navigation ability of the GLSDB allow it to evade obstacles and anti-air defenses by steering around them, even approaching from the target’s rear. Since the GLSDB is a glider, it also has little IR signature, making it a bad target for IR homing missiles such as MANPADS.

== Use in combat ==
On 3 February 2023, the United States government announced an aid package for Ukraine as part of assistance during the 2022 Russian invasion of Ukraine. It would include the GLSDB, which could be launched out of existing Ukraine-operated HIMARS or MLRS launchers (or out of its own launcher) to hit Russian targets that had been moved out of GMLRS range. The GLSDB almost doubles the range that Ukraine could previously target with these launchers (150 km (93 mi) vs 85 km (53 mi) with GMLRS).

The weapon entered "initial mass production stage" in 2023. On 30 January 2024, Politico reported that the missiles could be deployed as soon as the following day. On 14 February 2024, Russian media published footage on what appeared to be a GLSDB tail wreckage, reportedly found near Kreminna, Luhansk Oblast. On 26 March 2024, a GLSDB was used to strike a house, in Chernyanka, Kherson, where Russian UAV operators were based. Ukrainian forces also destroyed a Russia 2S9 Nona 120 mm mortar and the “burning” of another in Zaporizhzhia.

In April 2024, a U.S. defense official remarked that the combat performance had been disappointing: due to Russian jamming and deficiencies in tactics, techniques, and procedures "it just didn't work". The War Zone was not certain that this was the weapon system referred to. Under Secretary of Defense for Acquisition and Sustainment, William LaPlante, could have referred also to the APKWS II or another undisclosed weapon system. The Under Secretary also noted that the production and testing of the weapon was "raced and (they) did it as fast as they could". He also referred to multiple reasons, including tactics, doctrine and "electromagnetic interference" as being issues.

Ukrainian Air Force has used air dropped GBU-39 Small Diameter Bombs since November 2023. The air dropped Small Diameter Bomb "has proved resilient to jamming” and has a “nearly 90 percent" accuracy rate. Ukraine had previously operated the GLSDB ground launched version of the Small Diameter Bomb which was regarded "ineffective" due to Russian jamming. The air-launched version is also harder to intercept due to the small size. This small size, combined with being air launched, means that the SDB might hit a target before Russian electronic warfare can jam the weapon. The GLSDB has a "parabolic flight path" of artillery fire that can be detected on radar.

As of 13 March 2025, the US started resupplying Ukraine with GLSDB due to a shortage of ATACMS missiles. The new versions have reinforced connections to prevent electronic jamming. The new weapons can travel at up to Mach 5 and have a range of 150 kms.

== Operators ==
=== Current operators ===
- Ukraine
  - Ukrainian Ground Forces

=== Potential operators ===
- Taiwan
  - Republic of China Army
- Sweden
  - Swedish Army

== See also ==
- GBU-39 Small Diameter Bomb – the bomb from which this rocket is derived.
- GBU-53/B StormBreaker – upgraded successor to the SDB.
- Precision Strike Missile
- GMLRS
