= AT2 mine =

Scatterable anti-tank mine

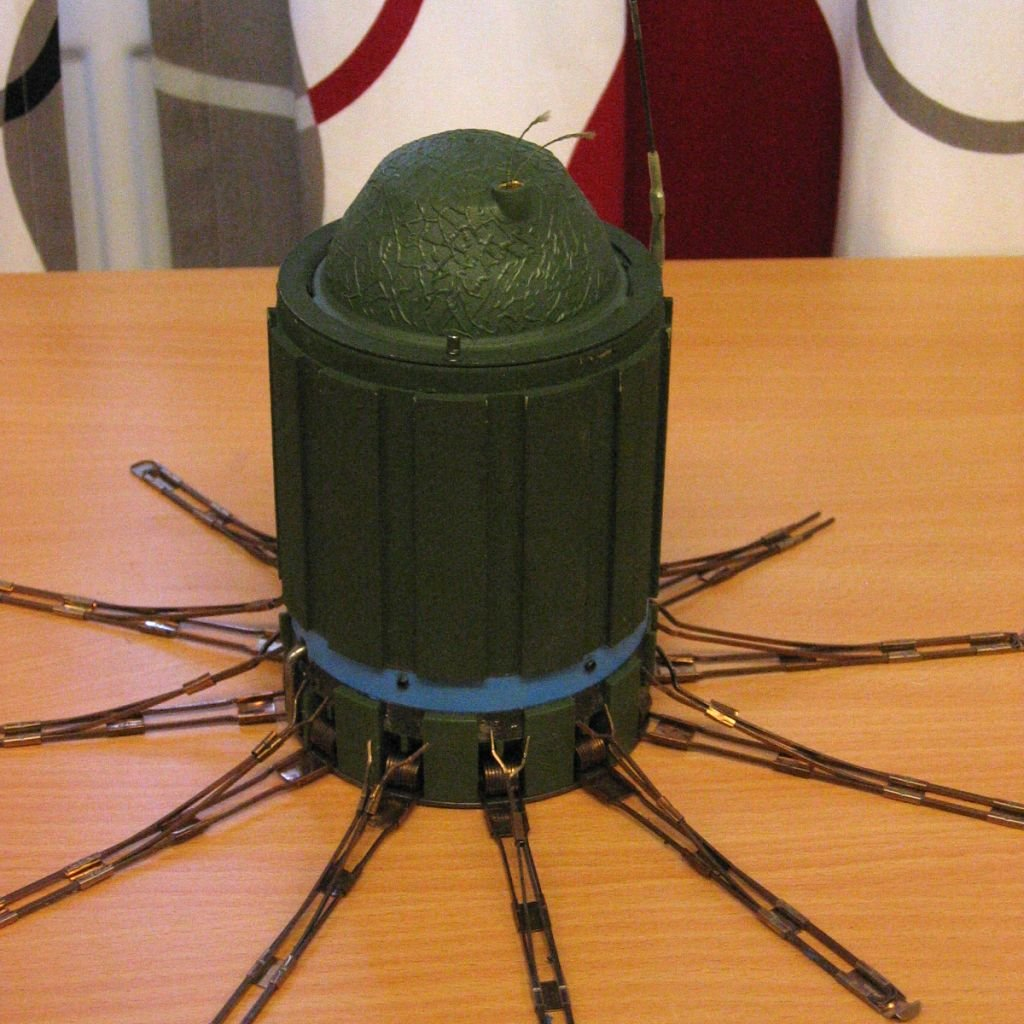
- AT-2 scatterable anti-tank mine
- Type: Anti-tank mine

Service history
- Used by: See list
- Wars: Russo-Ukrainian War

Production history
- Manufacturer: Dynamit Nobel Defence
- Developed from: AT1 mine

Specifications
- Mass: 2.22 kilograms (4.9 lb)
- Filling: Composition B
- Filling weight: 907 grams (32.0 oz)

The AT2 mine is a scatterable anti-tank mine developed by Dynamit Nobel. It can be scattered from artillery rockets or from mine laying systems, and is in service with the British, German and Norwegian armed forces. AT2 mines were donated to Ukraine by Germany.

== Description ==
The mine is cylindrical with a hemispherical top and flat bottom. A thin aerial-like wire extends from the top of the mine, and is the S3 "scratch wire" contact fuze. Five or more metal legs (depending on the exact model) around the base of the mine fold out to stand the mine upright. Additionally the mine is fitted with a small plastic parachute when it is deployed from rockets to reduce the impact when the mine lands.

The mine is triggered when the scratch wire fuze drags along the bottom of a vehicle or when it is crushed by pressure. Additionally the mine has a magnetic-influence fuze. The mine uses a Misznay-Schardin effect warhead to penetrate the belly of armour vehicles; the projectile formed is optimized for after-armour effects. The mine auto-destructs after one of six selectable periods, up to a maximum of four days; the self-destruct mechanism is reported to be 99% reliable. Should the self-destruct mechanism fail, the battery powering the fuze would fail after a short period of time. The mine is additionally fitted with an unspecified anti-handling device.

== Legality ==
After the Ottawa Treaty, Italy concluded that the fuze of the AT2 was sensitive enough to be set off by a person and destroyed its stockpile of 45,000 mines.

== Specifications ==
- Weight: 2.22 kilograms (4.9 lb)
- Diameter: 103.5 millimetres (4.07 in)
- Height:
  - Mine body: 128 millimetres (5.0 in)
  - To top of dome: 160 millimetres (6.3 in)
  - To top of sensor: 700 millimetres (28 in)
- Penetration: > 140 millimetres (5.5 in)

== Variants ==
- DM 1233 (300,000 produced) for German 110 mm LARS
- DM 1274 (640,000 produced by 1992) for the Skorpion mine laying system
- DM 1399 (350,000 produced) for M270 MLRS and MiWS Skorpion systems.
- NG AT2+ (programmable anti-tank ammunition with digitalised control and a multi-sensor system)

== Users ==
=== Current users ===
- Germany
- Norway
- Ukraine
- United Kingdom
- Finland

=== Former users ===
- Italy

=== Future users ===
- Denmark
- Sweden

== Bibliography ==
- King, Colin (ed.). Jane's Mines And Mine Clearance 2005/2006 (10th ed.). Jane's Information Group. ISBN 9780710627018.
