= Dense inert metal explosive =

Explosive weapon

Dense inert metal explosive (DIME) is an experimental type of explosive that has a relatively small but effective blast radius. It is manufactured by producing a homogeneous mixture of an explosive material (such as phlegmatized HMX or RDX) and small particles of a chemically inert material such as tungsten. It is intended to limit the effective distance of the explosion, to avoid collateral damage in warfare.

The phrase inert metal refers to a metal that is not chemically active and therefore not part of the chemical reaction that causes the explosion, as opposed to some metals, such as aluminium, that do form part of the chemical reaction—e.g. in tritonal.

An emerging criticism of DIME weapons is that they might turn out to have strong biological effects in those who are hit by the micro-shrapnel from these explosives.

DIME mixtures have been studied for some time, but apparently only began to be adopted for weapons after the year 2000.

== Method of operation ==
A DIME weapon consists of a carbon fiber casing filled with a mixture of explosive and very dense microshrapnel, consisting of very small particles (1–2 mm) or powder of a heavy metal. To date, tungsten alloy (heavy metal tungsten alloy, or HMTA) composed of tungsten and other metals such as cobalt and nickel or iron has been the preferred material for the dense microshrapnel or powder.

Two common HMTA alloys are:

- rWNiCo: tungsten (91–93%), nickel (3–5%) and cobalt (2–4%)
- rWNiFe: tungsten (91–93%), nickel (3–5%) and iron (2–4%)

Upon detonation of the explosive, the casing disintegrates into extremely small particles, as opposed to larger pieces of shrapnel which results from the fragmentation of a metal shell casing. The HMTA powder acts like micro-shrapnel which is very lethal at close range (about 4 m or 13 ft), but loses momentum very quickly due to air resistance, coming to a halt within approximately 40 times the diameter of the charge. This increases the probability of killing people within a few meters of the explosion while reducing the probability of causing death and injuries or damage farther away. Survivors close to the lethal zone may still have their limbs amputated by the HMTA microshrapnel, which can slice through soft tissue and bone.

== Toxic/carcinogenic effects ==
The carcinogenic effects of heavy metal tungsten alloys (HMTA) (along with depleted uranium [DU]) have been studied by the U.S. Armed Forces since at least the year 2000. These alloys were found to cause neoplastic transformations of human osteoblast cells.

A more recent U.S. Department of Health and Human Services study, from 2005, found that HMTA shrapnel rapidly induces rhabdomyosarcoma in laboratory rats.

Tungsten alloy carcinogenicity may be most closely related to the nickel content of the alloys used in weapons to date; however, pure tungsten and tungsten trioxide are also suspected of carcinogenic and other toxic properties, and have been shown to have such effects in animal studies.

In 2009, a group of Italian scientists affiliated with the New Weapons Research Committee (NWRC) watchdog group pronounced DIME wounds "untreatable" because the powdered tungsten they dispense cannot be removed surgically.

== Use in battle ==
In July and August 2006, doctors in the Gaza Strip reported unusual wounds caused by Israel Defense Forces attacks against Palestinians, claiming that they were from previously unknown weapons. A lab analysis of the metals found in the victims' bodies was reportedly "compatible with the hypothesis" that DIME weapons were involved. Israel denied possessing or using such weapons, and an Israeli military expert said that the wounds were consistent with ordinary explosives.

Mads Gilbert and Erik Fosse, working on wounded from the 2008–2009 Israel–Gaza conflict, reported injuries that they believed were caused by some new type of weapon used by Israel, which they speculated were DIME bombs. Gilbert and Fosse made the same accusations during the 2014 Gaza conflict.

In the Gaza war, there have been reports of fragmentary explosive devices containing minuscule fragmentation clusters of tungsten alloy, with doctors having retrieved the material from bodies of victims.

== See also ==
- GBU-39 Small Diameter Bomb
