= Camp Fuji =

US Marine Corps installation in Japan

Coordinates: 35°19′14″N 138°52′07″E

- Gotemba, Japan
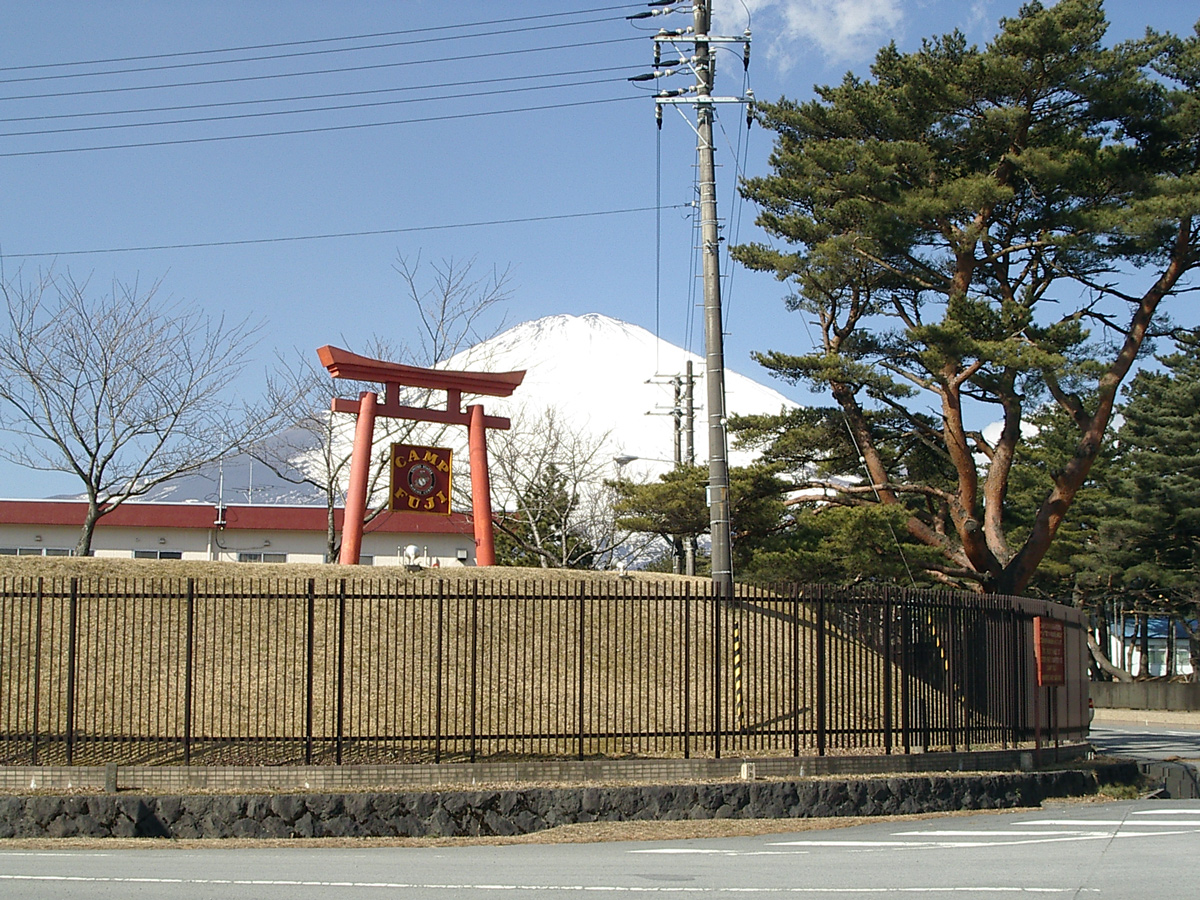
- Camp Fuji, with Mount Fuji visible

Site information
- Type: Military base
- Controlled by: United States Marine Corps

Combined Arms Training Center (CATC) Camp Fuji is an installation of the United States Marine Corps next to the Japan Ground Self Defense Force JGSDF Camp Takigahara (Japanese: 滝ヶ原駐屯地). It is located near the city of Gotemba in Shizuoka Prefecture, Japan, at the base of Mount Fuji. Camp Fuji is one of several Camps of the Marine Corps Base Camp Butler complex.

JGSDF Camp Fuji (Japanese: 富士駐屯地), namesake of this installation, is located 2.5 miles north of the USMC base.

== History ==
The area around the base of Mount Fuji has been associated with the military since medieval times. The samurai of the Kamakura Shogunate conducted military training in this area in the 15th century. In the modern era, the large East Fuji Maneuver Area was established by the Imperial Japanese Army as a training facility, and several training bases were established in the area. After the surrender of Japan at the end of World War II, these bases were occupied by the United States Army, and were designated "Camp Fuji McNair", "North Camp", "Middle Camp", and "South Camp". Half of "North Camp" was turned over to the United States Marine Corps (USMC) in 1953, while the other half (across the street from present-day Camp Fuji) was eventually turned over to the Japan Ground Self-Defense Force (JGSDF) where it is now JGSDF Camp Takigahara.

== Description ==
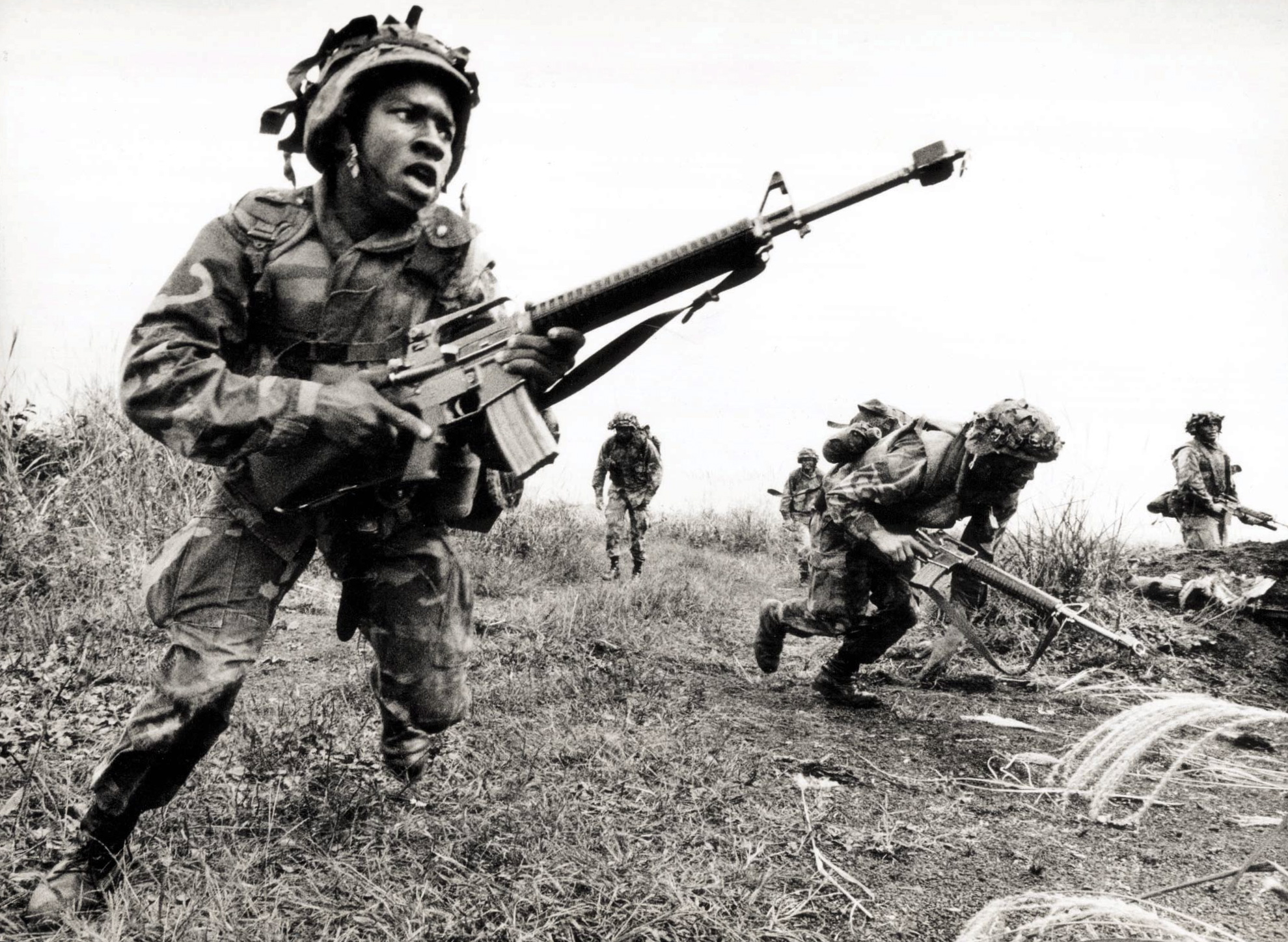
US Marines training at Camp Fuji in 1996

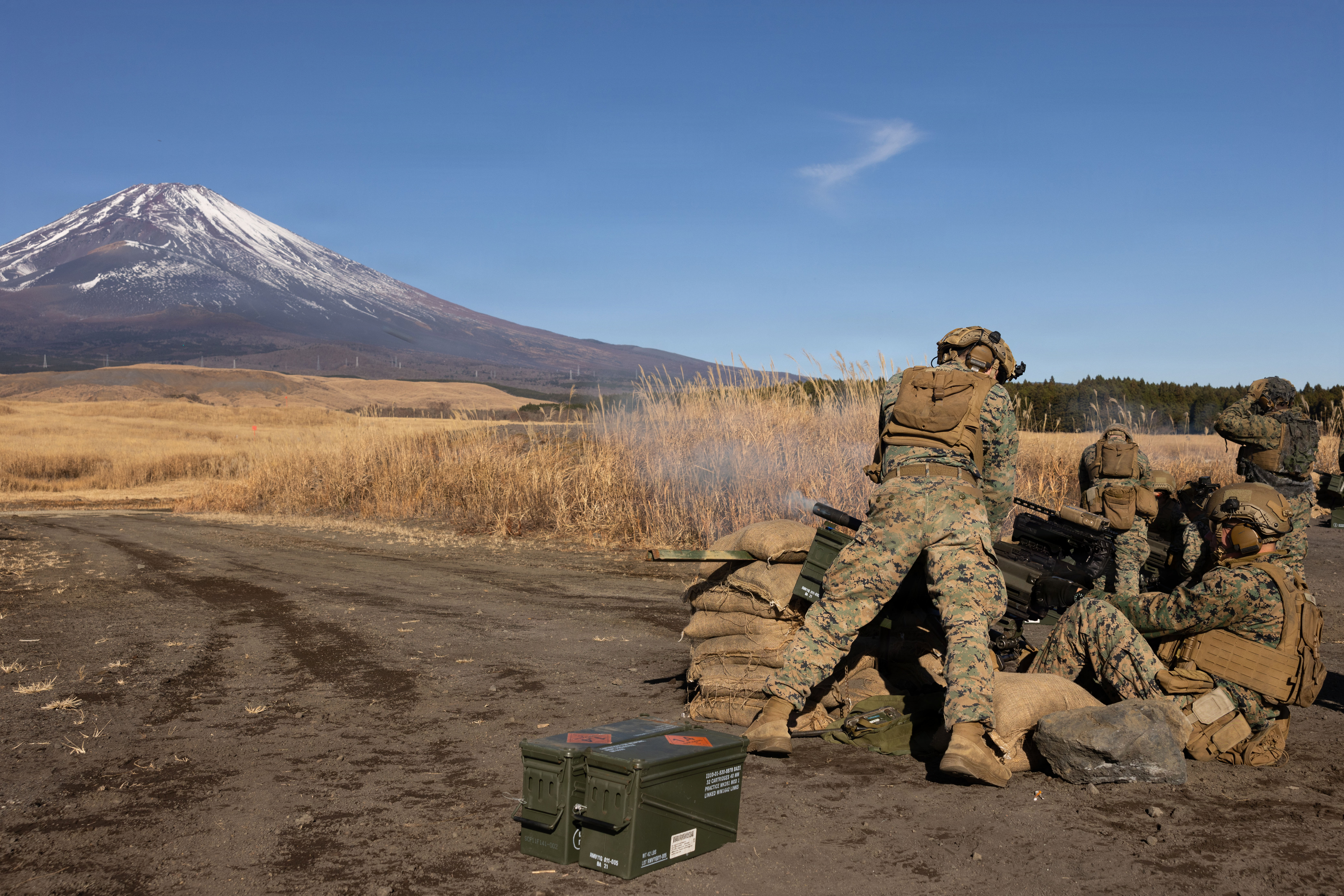
1st Battalion, 6th Marines fire a Mk 19 grenade launcher during training at Camp Fuji in 2025

The 309-acre (1.25 km^{2}) facility includes 34 acres (140,000 m^{2}) of ranges and maneuver area to serve as a combined arms training area. Camp Fuji is under the exclusive control of the USMC, although the helicopter landing pad is a joint-use facility for both the United States and the JGSDF.

Units from across the Pacific (including those participating in the Unit Deployment Program) come to Camp Fuji to train. The facilities were considered spartan compared to most military bases, with no family housing, limited military exchange and recreation facilities, and limited medical facilities, although extensive modernization and expansion programs from 1983 have added new barracks, enlisted and officers club, a barber shop, library and food facilities.

== See also ==
- List of United States Marine Corps installations
- United States Forces Japan
