= East Fuji Maneuver Area =

Japanese military installation

- 陸上自衛隊東富士演習場
- Gotemba, Susono, Oyama, Shizuoka Prefecture Japan
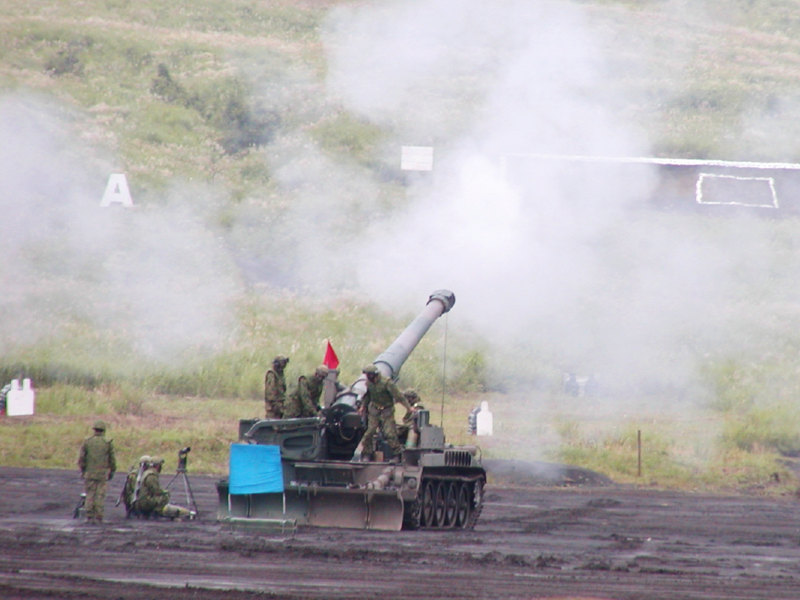
- JGSDF M110A2 on live fire exercises

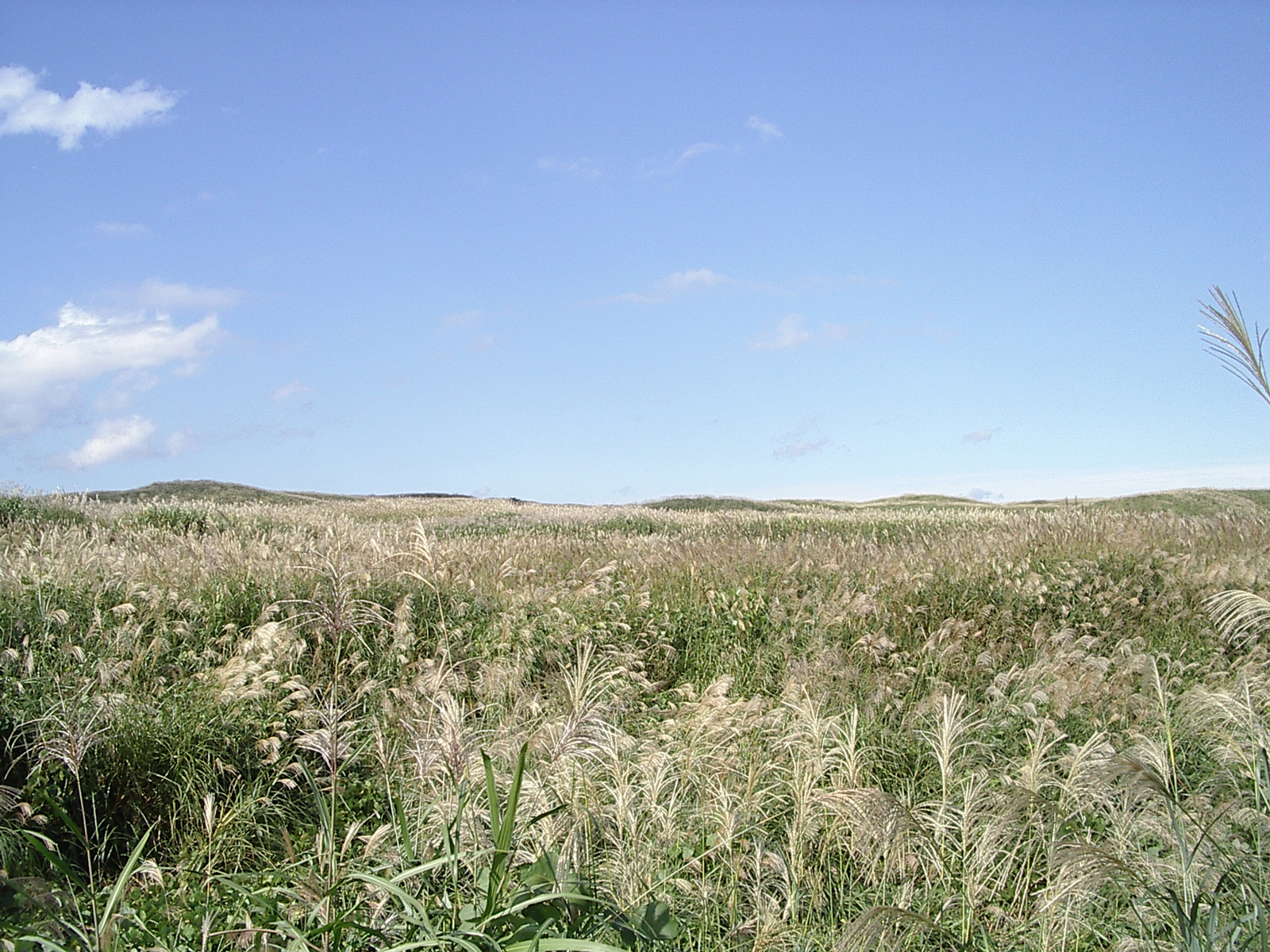
- East Fuji Maneuver Area

Site information
- Type: Military Base
- Controlled by: Japan Ground Self-Defense Force

Location
- Location within Shizuoka Prefecture Location within Japan
- Coordinates: 35°19′N 138°51′E

Site history
- Built: 1912
- In use: 1912-1945 Imperial Japanese Army; 1945-1966 United States Army; 1966-present Japan Ground Self-Defense Force

JGSDF East Fuji Maneuver Area (陸上自衛隊東富士演習場, Rikujō Jieitai Higashi-Fuji Enshūjō) is the major training grounds for the Japan Ground Self-Defense Force on Honshū, Japan. It is one of several military facilities located in the foothills of Mount Fuji and extends over parts of Gotemba, Susono and Oyama, in Shizuoka Prefecture. Its total area is 88.09 square kilometers.

== History ==
The area around the base of Mount Fuji has been associated with the military since medieval times. The samurai of the Kamakura Shogunate conducted military training in this area in the 13th century. In the modern era, the Imperial Japanese Army began using the sparsely populated area as a training ground since 1898. The "Fuji-Susono Maneuver Area" was formally established in 1912. To support training activities, a number of military bases were established in the vicinity, including Camp Takigahara (1908), Camp Itazuma (1909), and Camp Komakado (1936).

After the surrender of Japan at the end of World War II, these bases were occupied by the United States Army, and continued to be used for training. In 1951, the area was formally returned to the control of the Japanese government, but continued to be used exclusively by the American military under the status of forces agreement.

The post-war Japanese Ground Japan Self-Defense Force lacked suitable training facilities, but was only granted access to the East Fuji Maneuver Area in 1959 after four years of legal action over the opposition of local landholders and reluctance by the American military. On July 31, 1966, the East Fuji Maneuver Area and its surrounding bases (with the exception of Camp Fuji of the United States Marine Corps, whom share the training area) were formally returned to the control of the Japanese government and the Japan Ground Self-Defense Force.

== Annual event ==
The East Fuji Maneuver Grounds is the location for the annual Fuji Live Firing Exercises (富士総合火力演習, Fuji Sōgō Karyoku Enshū), which occurs throughout the month of August. On public days, the event is attended by the Minister of Defense and military attachés from various foreign nations.
