= Kisarazu Air Field =

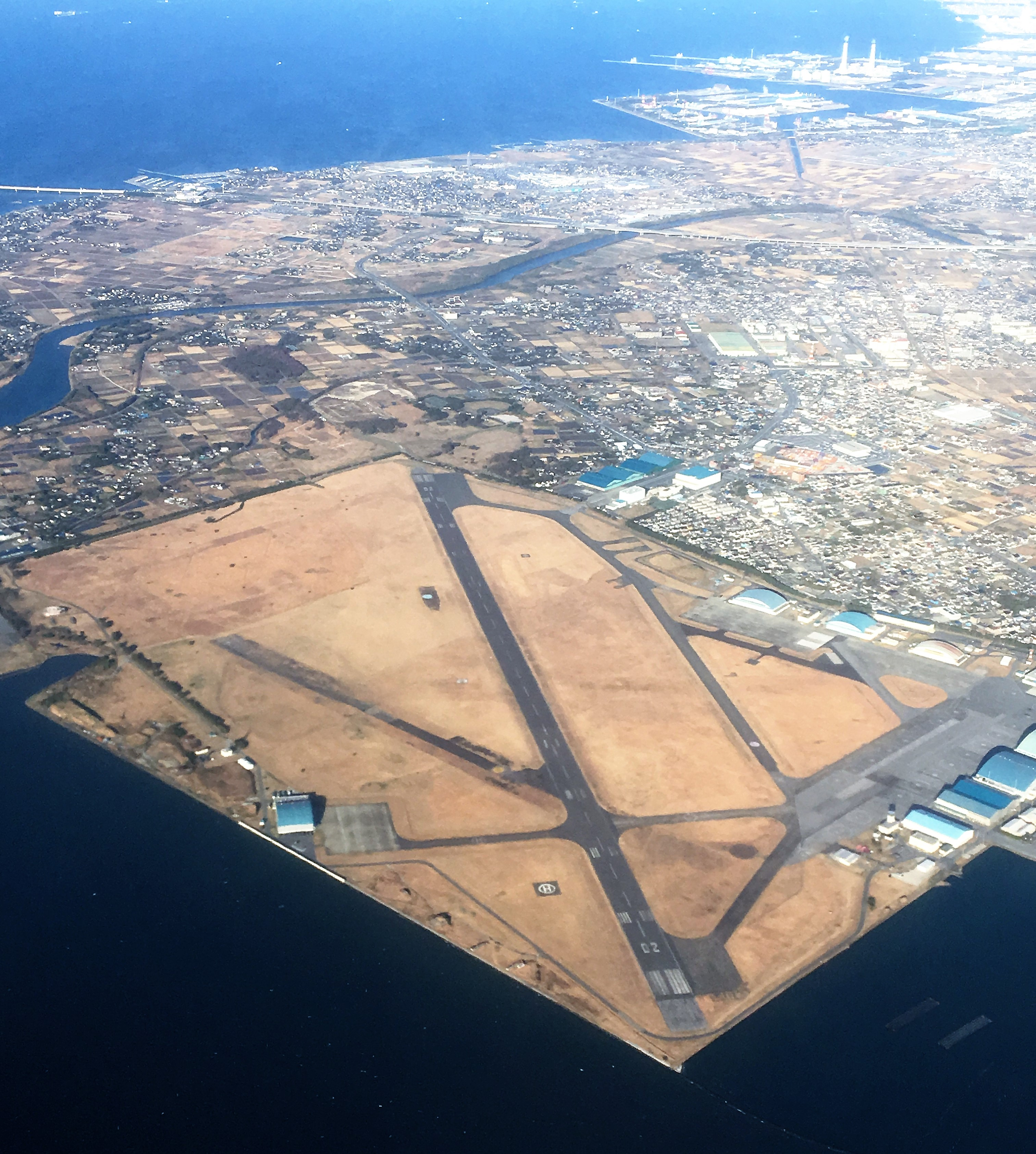
- IATA: none; ICAO: RJTK

Summary
- Airport type: Military
- Operator: Japan Ground Self-Defense Force
- Location: Kisarazu, Japan
- Elevation AMSL: 10 ft / 3 m
- Coordinates: 35°23′42″N 139°54′47″E
- Website: JGSDF 1st Helicopter Brigade

Map
- Location in Japan

Runways
Direction	Length		Surface
Direction	m	ft	Surface
02/20	1,830	6,004	Asphalt concrete
- Source: Japanese AIP at AIS Japan

Kisarazu Air Field (木更津飛行場, Kisarazu Hikōjō) (ICAO: RJTK) is a military aerodrome of the Japan Ground Self-Defense Force JGSDF Camp Kisarazu (木更津駐屯地, Kisarazu Chūtonchi). It is located 1.2 NM (2.2 km; 1.4 mi) north northwest of Kisarazu in the Chiba Prefecture, Japan.

== Operations ==
JGSDF Kisarazu is home to the JGSDF 1st Helicopter Brigade, which is attached to the Central Readiness Force. operating as a supporting unit for the 1st Airborne Brigade and the Japanese Special Forces Group. The base also supports tenant units from the Japan Maritime Self-Defense Force and Japan Air Self-Defence Force

== History ==
=== Establishment and World War II ===
Kisarazu Air Field was originally established in 1936 as a base for the Imperial Japanese Navy Air Service, subordinate to the Yokosuka Naval District. It was home to the Kisarazu Air Group, the Imperial Japanese Navy's first dedicated land-based bomber unit, which saw extensive combat during the Second Sino-Japanese War and World War II. The base was also used for training, and the testing of experimental aircraft, including Japan's first jet-powered aircraft, the Nakajima Kikka.

=== Postwar period ===
After the end of World War II, from September 1945 the base was used by the United States Air Force as "Kisarazu Air Base". In 1956, the base was officially transferred to the control of the Japan Air Self-Defense Force (JASDF) and was used as a training base; although USAF units remained on the base in a tenant capacity until transferred to Tachikawa Air Base in 1961. Subsequently, American assets at Kisarazu came under the control of the United States Navy. In 1968, the JASDF relocated to Iruma Air Base, and Kisarazu was transferred to the control of the Japan Ground Self-Defense Force.

Remaining United States Navy assets were transferred to United States Fleet Activities Yokosuka from 1975, and there is currently no American presence at Kisarazu; however, under the terms of the Treaty of Mutual Cooperation and Security between the United States and Japan, Kisarazu Air Field remains available for use by aircraft of the United States 7th Fleet under the name "Kisarazu Auxiliary Landing Field".

=== Osprey maintenance hub ===
In 2014 the Japanese government publicly offered the base as a site for a maintenance hub for maintenance of V-22 Osprey tiltrotor aircraft operated by the United States Marine Corps from MCAS Futenma in Okinawa. The aircraft require maintenance every six years but the Futenma base lacks the facilities to do it.

The JGSDF's Ospreys were previously maintained at this facility before moving to Saga, Japan. Civilians from The Boeing Company and Bell Helicopter will assist JGSDF members conducting the maintenance. Noise level tests were conducted at Kisarazu in October 2016, comparing the Osprey noise to that of a CH-47 Chinook. There was some opposition from local residents. Maintenance of the aircraft was to begin from 2017. An opening ceremony was held on January 12, 2017.
