= 1st Helicopter Brigade =

- JGSDF 1st Helicopter Brigade insignia
- Active: March 20, 1959 – present
- Country: Japan
- Branch: Japan Ground Self-Defense Force
- Type: Army aviation
- Role: Provide aviation support to Ground Component Command (陸上総隊); Search and rescue Support special operations
- Size: Brigade (~900 soldiers)
- Part of: Ground Component Command (陸上総隊)
- Garrison/HQ: Kisarazu, Chiba, Chiba

The 1st Helicopter Brigade (Japanese: 第1ヘリコプター団, Dai-ichi Herikoputa-Dan) is based at JGSDF Camp Kisarazu in Kisarazu, in Chiba Prefecture. Formerly an independent brigade, it was attached to the Central Readiness Force on March 28, 2007. Like most JGSDF units, the brigade's aircraft are deployed to conduct exercises from their Kisarazu base annually during the New Year period.

The brigade operates under the Ground Component Command (Japanese: 陸上総隊), formerly with the Central Readiness Force, as a supporting unit for the Central Readiness Regiment (CRR), 1st Airborne Brigade and the Japanese Special Forces Group (SFGp) if deployed into a combat zone.

Prior to the brigade's integration into the CRF, it had been actively involved in civil disaster operations in response to natural disasters such as wildfire, earthquakes, and flood.

== History ==
The 1st Helicopter Brigade was first established on March 20, 1959, by the Japan Ground Self-Defense Force Aviation School at JGSDF Camp Kasumigaura in Kasumigaura, Ibaraki. After the brigade was established, two helicopter companies were created on March 1, 1968, during a period of reorganization.

The 1st Helicopter Company was stationed at JGSDF Camp Kisarazu on March 22, 1968, with the 2nd Helicopter Company arriving on June 1, 1968. A special transport squad was established in the brigade on December 19, 1986. Another period of reorganization began on March 27, 2006, when a communications and reconnaissance squad was added to the unit. On March 28, 2007, the 1st Helicopter Brigade was formally incorporated into the Central Readiness Force.

The brigade was deployed by the Central Readiness Force on its first operation to subdue wildfires in the forests of the Yamanashi Prefecture on April 29, 2007. They have been also deployed on humanitarian operations, specifically in the aftermath of the March 2011 earthquake.

On March 26, 2020, the 1HB has established an aviation corp to manage V-22 Ospreys for the ARDB. The Ospreys are due to be deployed to Kisarazu with plans to be deployed at Saga Airport in the future. One CH-47J helicopter squadron is to be at JGSDF Vice Camp Takayubaru.

== Aircraft in service ==
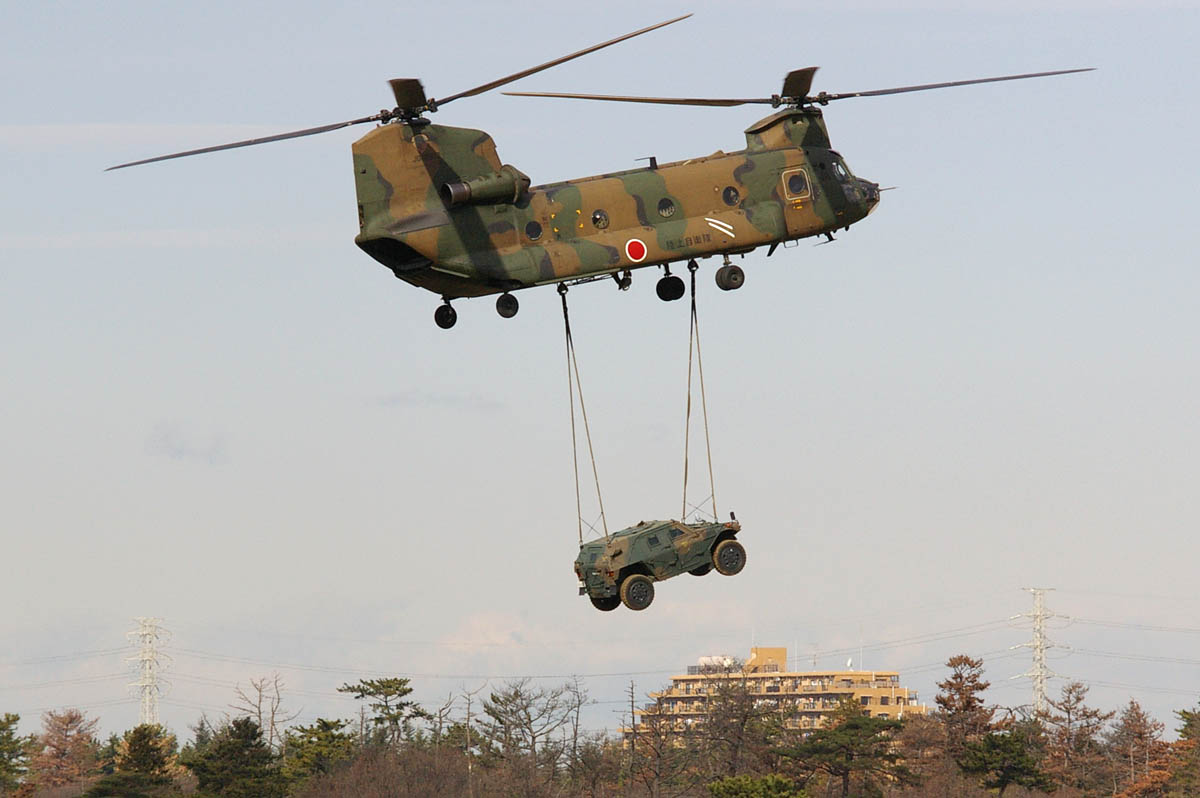
A Japanese CH-47 helicopter

The 1st Helicopter Brigade currently utilize the following aircraft for the Ground Component Command:

Aircraft	Origin	Type	Versions	Notes
Boeing CH-47 Chinook	Japan	Transport helicopter	CH-47J CH-47JA	Built by Kawasaki
Eurocopter EC 225	France	VIP helicopter	EC 225LP	
Kawasaki OH-1	Japan		Built by Kawasaki	
Beechcraft Super King Air	United States	Utility transport	LR-2	
Mitsubishi H-60	Japan	Transport helicopter	UH-60JA	Built by Mitsubishi

== Organization ==
- 1st Helicopter Brigade, at Kisarazu Airfield
  - Headquarters Company, at Kisarazu Airfield
  - Special Transport Helicopter Squadron, at Kisarazu Airfield, with EC 225LP Super Puma helicopters
  - Liaison and Reconnaissance Squadron, at Kisarazu Airfield, with LR-2 Super King Air aircraft
  - 102nd Squadron, at Kisarazu Airfield, with UH-60JA Black Hawk helicopters
  - 1st Helicopter Field Maintenance Company, at Kisarazu Airfield
  - 1st Transport Helicopter Group
    - 1st Transport Helicopter Group Headquarters Company
    - 103rd Squadron, with CH-47J/JA Chinook helicopters
    - 104th Squadron, with CH-47J/JA Chinook helicopters
    - 105th Squadron, with CH-47J/JA Chinook helicopters
    - 106th Squadron, with CH-47J/JA Chinook helicopters
  - Transport Air Wing, at Saga Airport
    - Transport Air Wing Headquarters Company
    - 107th Squadron, with V-22 Osprey tiltrotor aircraft
    - 108th Squadron, with V-22 Osprey tiltrotor aircraft
    - 109th Squadron, at Kumamoto Airport, with CH-47J/JA Chinook helicopters
    - Transport Aircraft Field Maintenance Company
