= Kinugasa =

Kinugasa may refer to:

- Kinugasa (surname), a Japanese surname
- Japanese cruiser Kinugasa, an Aoba class heavy cruiser of the Imperial Japanese Navy
- Kinugasa (plant), a synonym of the flowering plant genus Paris
- Kinugasa Station, a train station in Yokosuka, Kanagawa, Japan
- Phallus indusiatus, a species of edible mushroom known as kinugasatake ("Kinugasa mushroom") in Japanese cuisine
