= JGSDF Camp Takigahara =

Military base in Shizuoka Prefecture, Japan

- 滝ヶ原駐屯地
- Gotemba, Shizuoka, Japan
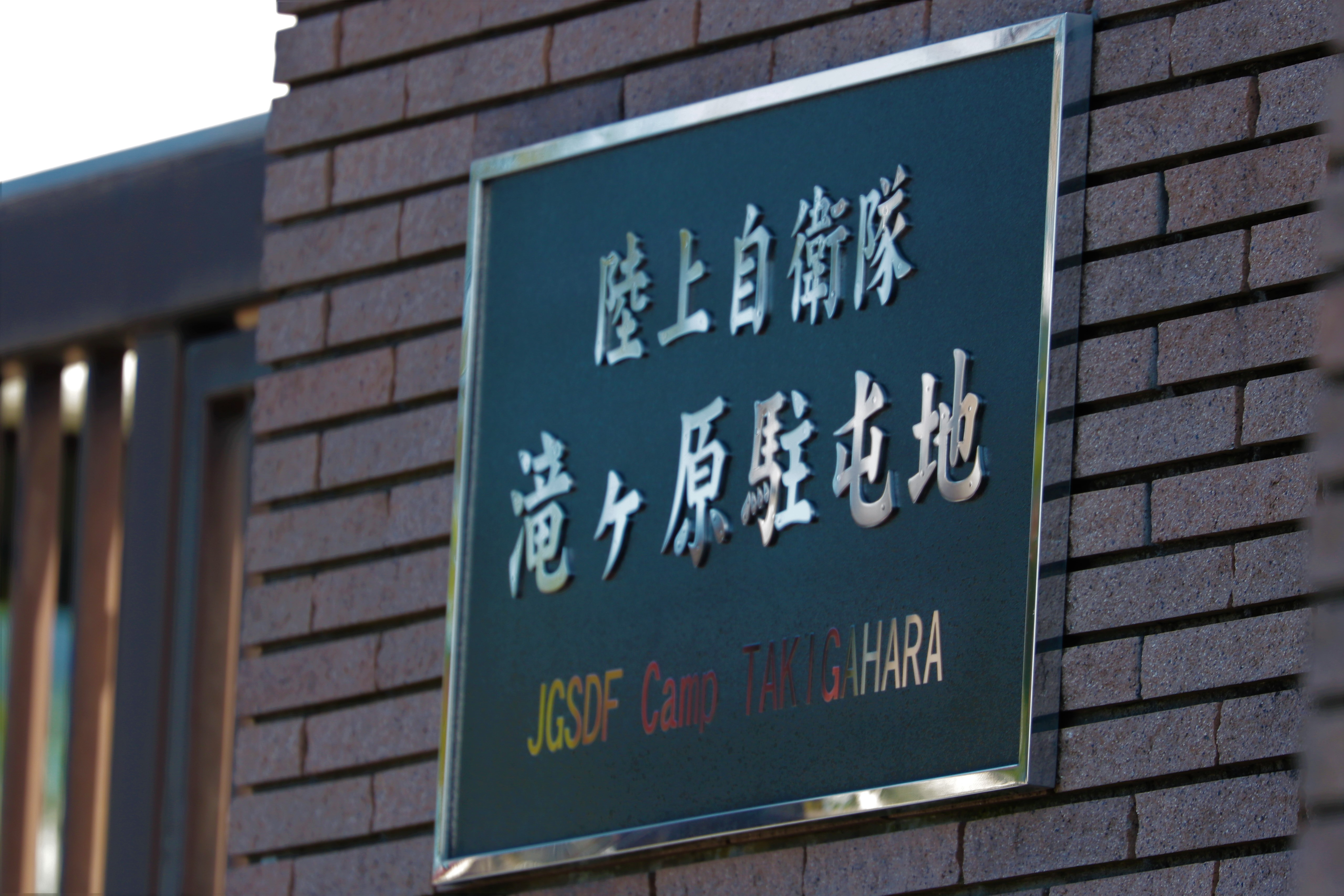

Site information
- Type: Military Base
- Controlled by: Japan Ground Self-Defense Force

Location
- Coordinates: 35°19′24″N 138°52′34″E

Site history
- Built: 1909
- In use: 1909-1945 Imperial Japanese Army; 1945-1960 United States Army; 1960-present Japan Ground Self-Defense Force

JGSDF Camp Takigahara (滝ヶ原駐屯地, Takigahara-chūtonchi) is a military base of the Japan Ground Self-Defense Force, located in Gotemba, Shizuoka prefecture, Japan. It is one of several military facilities located in the foothills of Mount Fuji, and is located across a road from Camp Fuji of the United States Marine Corps .

== History ==
Camp Takigahara was established in 1908 by the Imperial Japanese Army as a training facility. After the end of World War II, it came under the control of the United States Army in Japan, and was renamed “North Camp”. The US Army turned over half of North Camp to the United States Marine Corps in 1953, with the other half (across the street from present-day Camp Fuji) was eventually turned over the Japan Ground Self-Defense Force as the Takigahara Garrison.

In 1974, Takigaha was elevated to the status of a full base, and reestablished as a training facility for the post-war Ground Japan Self-Defense Force. Camp Takigahara oversees operations of the large joint-use East Fuji Maneuver Area.

Units from Camp Takigahara cooperated in the filming of the 2001 movie Godzilla, Mothra and King Ghidorah: Giant Monsters All-Out Attack.

== Organization ==
=== Units Directly Under the Minister of Defense ===
- JGSDF Fuji School (Combined Training)
  - JGSDF Fuji School (Combined Training) Brigade
    - Infantry School Regiment (Mechanized)
      - Educational Support Facility Team
    - Driving School
  - JGSDF Training Evaluation Unit
    - Evaluation Support Unit
- Japan Ground Self-Defense Force Aviation School
  - Flight Training Unit
    - Fuji Flight Unit
- JGSDF Military Police Unit
  - JGSDF Eastern Army Military police Group
    - 128th District Police Unit
      - Takigahara Liaison Team

=== Units Subordinate to the Eastern Army ===
- Eastern Army Aviation Group
  - Eastern Army Air Traffic Control and Meteorological Group
    - 2nd Detachment
- Eastern Army Accounting Group
  - 433rd Accounting Group
- Eastern Army District Systems and Communications Group
  - 105th Base Systems and Communications Battalion
    - 305th Base Systems and Communications Company
      - Takigahara Detachment
- Takigahara Garrison Support Unit

=== Joint Units ===
- JSDF Intelligence Security Command
  - Eastern Information Security Unit
    - Takigahara Information Security Detachment

== Nearest Major Transportation Routes ==
- Expressway: Tomei Expressway Gotemba IC, Susono IC
- General Roads: Japan National Route 138, Japan National Route 246, Japan National Route 469, Shizuoka Prefectural Road 23 (Gotemba-Fuji Park Line), Shizuoka Prefectural Road 401 / Kanagawa Prefectural Road 736 (Gotemba-Hakone Line)
- Rail: JR Gotemba Line Gotemba Station
- Bus Routes: Fujikyu Mobility E Youth Exchange Center Line, Takigahara Self-Defense Forces Bus Stop
- Ports: Shimizu Port (Specified Important Port), Tagonoura Port, Yokohama Port (Important Ports)
- Airports: Haneda Airport
