= Hayao =

- Gender: Male

Origin
- Origin: Japanese
- Meaning: Different meanings depending on the kanji used

Hayao (written: 駿, 隼雄, 速雄 or 駿雄) is a masculine Japanese given name. Notable people with the name include:

- Hayao Kawabe (川辺 駿; born 1995), Japanese footballer
- Hayao Kawai (河合 隼雄; 1928–2007), Japanese psychologist
- Hayao Kinugasa (衣笠 駿雄; 1915–2007), Japanese military officer
- Hayao Miyazaki (宮崎 駿; born 1941), Japanese film director, producer, screenwriter, animator, writer and manga artist
- Hayao Nakayama (中山 隼雄; born 1932), Japanese businessman
- Shimamura Hayao (島村 速雄; 1858–1923), Imperial Japanese Navy admiral
- Hayao Tada (多田 駿; 1882–1948), Japanese general
