= Akihiko Saito =

Japanese security contractor and terrorism casualty

- Akihiko Saito in the mid 1980s when he was with the French Foreign Legion's 2nd Foreign Parachute Regiment.
- Born: January 5, 1961; Japan
- Died: May 9, 2005 (aged 44); Iraq
- Cause of death: Gunshot wounds sustained in a Jaish Ansar al-Sunna-planned ambush
- Occupations: 1st Airborne Brigade paratrooper, JGSDF (Former); 2nd Foreign Parachute Regiment soldier, French Foreign Legion, French Army (Former); Hart Security Ltd. Security contractor
- Relatives: Hironobu Saito (brother)

Akihiko Saito (斎藤昭彦, Saitō Akihiko; January 5, 1961 – May 9, 2005) was a Japanese security specialist adviser who was captured by the Jaish Ansar al-Sunna in Iraq in 2005.

Saito's abduction and subsequent death came as a shock to the Japanese public who were surprised to find out that a former member of the Japanese Self-Defence Force was operating as a private security officer in Iraq.

== Early life ==
Prior to entering the French Foreign Legion, Akihiko served in the Japan Ground Self-Defense Force (JGSDF) in the 1st Airborne Brigade in 1979 before he left in 1981. Akihiko was subsequently recruited into the ranks of the French Foreign Legion in June 1983, serving for 20 years. When he left the Legion, his rank was Chief Adjutant (French: Adjudant-Chef). Saito was notably deployed with the French Foreign Legion's 2nd Foreign Parachute Regiment, serving in numerous combat operations in Africa. During his time with the Legion, he was based at Calvi/Corsica.

== Abduction ==
Akihiko Saito had been working for Hart Security Ltd., a Cyprus-based British firm as a security specialist (under contract to PWC Logistics at the Abu Ghraib Warehouse Distribution Center near Baghdad International Airport) since December 2004 until his abduction by armed Jaish Ansar al-Sunna militants. He was ambushed alongside five other foreign contractors (most of them South African). However those foreign contractors were part of a convoy including twelve additional Iraqi security contractors along with five Iraqi truck drivers they were hired to safeguard; in total 23 people were killed in the ambush that took place in the town of Hit and in which Saito was abducted.

He was eventually killed by Jaish Ansar al-Sunna militants, as shown in a video released on the internet.

== Aftermath ==
Video of a dead body was posted online on May 27, 2005, purportedly by the group, along with Saito's identification papers and passport; his identity in the video was visually confirmed by his brother Hironobu Saito, the Japanese Foreign Ministry, the Japanese National Police Agency and Hart Security.

According to Al Jazeera, his presence in Iraq may have been used to legitimize the deployment of Japanese troops to Iraqi soil. His death was condemned by the Iraqi government. The Japanese government had condemned his death, saying that it will do little to hamper JSDF deployment to Iraq.

He was the sixth Japanese worker in Iraq to be taken hostage; two others had been killed and three released. While about 600 JGSDF personnel were in Iraq at any time, none had been killed when they withdrew in July 2006.

The Tokyo Stock Exchange was not affected by the kidnapping with traders saying that it did little or nothing at all to affect the stock market. His abduction fueled more opposition against the Japanese government's plans to send JSDF forces to Iraqi soil, believing that their presence would make them a terror target.
