= Kinugasa (surname) =

Kinugasa (written: 衣笠) is a Japanese surname. Notable people with the surname include:

- Hayao Kinugasa (衣笠 駿雄, 1915–2007), Japanese military officer
- Sachio Kinugasa (衣笠 祥雄, 1947-2018), Japanese baseball player
- Tatsuya Kinugasa (衣笠 竜也, born 1974), Japanese swimmer
- Teinosuke Kinugasa (衣笠 貞之助, 1896–1982), Japanese actor and film director
