= JGSDF Camp Komakado =

Military base in Shizuoka Prefecture, Japan

- 駒門駐屯地
- Gotemba, Shizuoka, Japan

Site information
- Type: Military Base
- Controlled by: Japan Ground Self-Defense Force

Location
- Location within Shizuoka Prefecture Location within Japan
- Coordinates: 35°15′25″N 138°54′09″E

Site history
- Built: 1936
- In use: 1936-1945 Imperial Japanese Army; 1945-1960 United States Army; 1960-present Japan Ground Self-Defense Force

JGSDF Camp Komakado (駒門駐屯地, Komakado-chūtonchi) is a military base of the Japan Ground Self-Defense Force, located in Gotemba, Shizuoka Prefecture, Japan. It is one of several military facilities located in the foothills of Mount Fuji.

== History ==
Camp Komakado was established in April 1936 by the Imperial Japanese Army as a training facility, and by 1943 it had become the central training school for Japan's heavy artillery regiments.

After the end of World War II, Camp Komakado came under the control of the United States Army in Japan, and was renamed "South Camp".

In 1960, after the conclusion of the Treaty of Mutual Cooperation and Security between the United States and Japan, the base was returned to the control of the Japanese government and reestablished as a training facility for artillery and armor under the post-war Ground Japan Self-Defense Force. The JSDF 1st Tank Battalion has been based at Camp Komakado since 1962.

The International Peace Cooperation Activities Training Unit of the JGSDF Central Readiness Force has been based at Camp Komakado since 2007.

== Organization ==
The following are units currently stationed in Camp Komakado:

=== Agencies Directly Under the Minister of Defense ===
- Japan Ground Self-Defense Force Fuji School
  - Fuji School (Combined Training) Brigade
    - Armored Training Regiment

=== Units Subordinate to Ground Component Command ===
- International Peace Cooperation Activities Training Unit

=== Units Subordinate to the Eastern Army ===
- 1st Division
  - 1st Anti-Aircraft Artillery Battalion
  - 1st Logistics Support Regiment
    - 2nd Maintenance Battalion
      - Anti-Aircraft Direct Support Unit: Supports the 1st Anti-Aircraft Artillery Battalion
- JGSDF Eastern Army System Signal Group
  - 105th Base Systems Communications Battalion
    - 305th Base Systems Communications Company
      - Komagata Detachment
- Eastern Army Accounting Unit
  - 433rd Accounting Unit
    - Komagata Liaison Team
- Komagata Garrison Operations Unit

=== Units Directly Under the Minister of Defense ===
- Military Police Unit
  - JGSDF Eastern Army Military police Group
    - 128th District Military Police Unit
      - Komagate Liaison Team

=== Organizations Under the Ground Self-Defense Force Supply Headquarters ===
- JGSDF Kanto Logistics Depot
  - Fuji Fuel Branch Office

=== Joint Organizations ===
- JSDF Shizuoka Provincial Cooperation Office
  - Fuji Regional Support Center

== Nearest Major Transportation Routes ==
- Expressway: Tomei Expressway Gotemba IC, Susono IC
- General Roads: Japan National Route 246, Japan National Route 469, Shizuoka Prefectural Route 155 (Takigahara–Fujioka Line), Shizuoka Prefectural Route 394 (Numazu–Koyama Line)
- Rail: JR Gotemba Line Fujioka Station (Shizuoka)
- Bus Routes: Fujikyu Mobility Special Needs School Line, Mishima Line (Osaka Bus Stop)
- Ports: Shimizu Port (International Hub Port), Tagonoura Port (Important Port), Yokohama Port (International Strategic Port)
- Airports: Haneda Airport
