= JGSDF Camp Itazuma =

Military base in Shizuoka Prefecture, Japan

- 板妻駐屯地
- Gotemba, Shizuoka, Japan
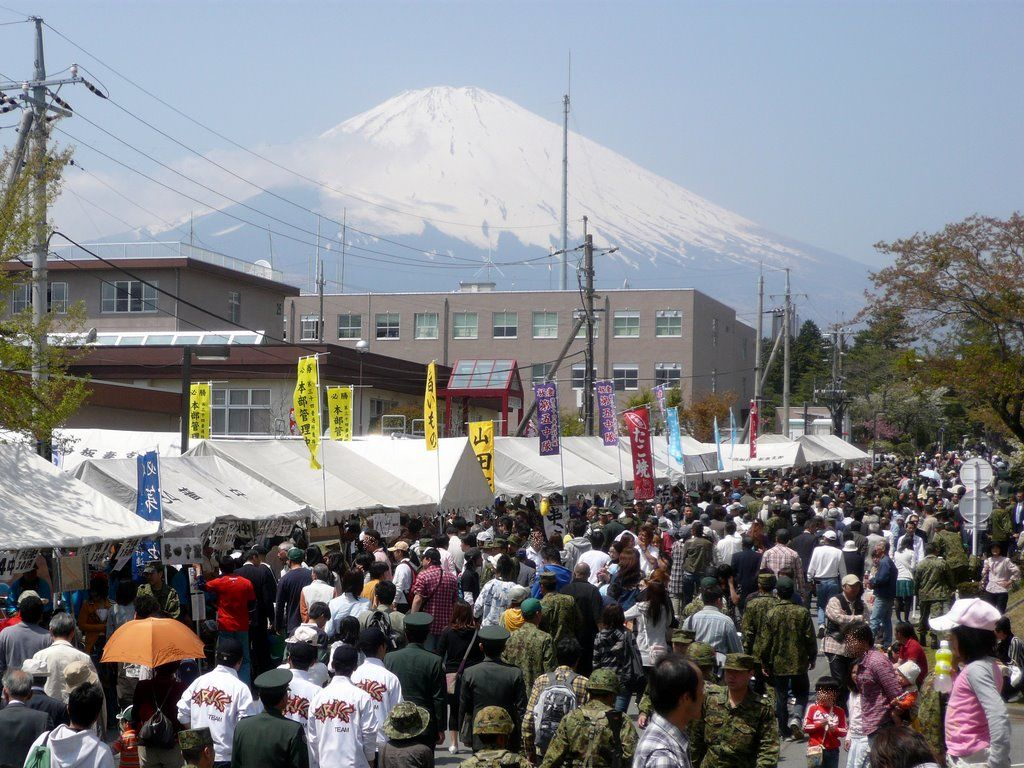

Site information
- Type: Military Base
- Controlled by: Japan Ground Self-Defense Force

Location
- Location within Shizuoka Prefecture Location within Japan
- Coordinates: 35°17′22″N 138°53′57″E

Site history
- Built: 1909
- In use: 1909-1945 Imperial Japanese Army; 1945-1960 United States Army; 1960-present Japan Ground Self-Defense Force

JGSDF Camp Itazuma (板妻駐屯地, Itazuma-chūtonchi) is a military base of the Japan Ground Self-Defense Force, located in Gotemba, Shizuoka prefecture, Japan. It is one of several military facilities located in the foothills of Mount Fuji.

== History ==
Camp Itazuma was established in April 1909 by the Imperial Japanese Army as a training facility. After the end of World War II, it came under the control of the 25th Infantry Division of the United States Army in Japan, and was renamed "Middle Camp".

In 1962, after the conclusion of the Treaty of Mutual Cooperation and Security between the United States and Japan, the base was returned to the control of the Japanese government and reestablished as a training facility for the post-war Japan Ground Self-Defense Force. It has been home to the JGSDF 34th Infantry Regiment, which has been active in various disaster relief operations throughout Japan since that time.

== Current Garrison Unit ==
=== Units Subordinate to the Eastern Army ===
- 1st Division (Japan)
  - JGSDF 34th Infantry Regiment
  - JGSDF 1st Logistics Support Regiment
    - 2nd Maintenance Battalion (Partial)
      - 3rd Infantry Direct Support Company: Supporting the 34th Infantry Regiment
- Eastern Army Mixed Brigade
  - 3rd Non-Commissioned Officer Training Battalion
  - JGSDF 31st Infantry Regiment
    - 1st Infantry Company (on assignment during training)
- Eastern Army Systems Communications Group
  - 105th Base Systems Communications Battalion
    - 305th Base Systems Communications Company (partial)
      - Itazuma Dispatch Team
- Eastern Army Accounting Unit
  - 433rd Accounting Unit (part)
    - Itazuma Liaison Team
- Itazuma Garrison Support Unit

=== Units Directly Under the Minister of Defense ===
- Eastern Army Military Police Unit
  - 128th District Military Police Unit (part)
    - Itazuma Liaison Team

== Former Garrison Unit ==
- March 26, 1975
  - 405th Base Signal Unit: Reorganized as the Itazuma Detachment of the 309th Base Signal Company, 101st Base Signal Battalion.
- Disbanded on March 27, 2002
  - 1st Anti-Tank Unit (“1対戦”):
  - 34th Infantry Regiment Heavy Mortar Company (“34普-重迫”):
- March 28, 2007 Reorganized
  - 309th Base Communications Company Itazuma Detachment: Reorganized into the 305th Base Systems Communications Company Itazuma Detachment.
- Disbanded on March 26, 2015
  - 420th Accounting Unit “420会”: Reorganized into the Itazuma Liaison Team of the 433rd Accounting Unit.

== Nearest Major Transportation Routes ==
- Expressway: Tomei Expressway Gotemba Interchange
- Local Roads: Japan National Route 246, Japan National Route 469, Shizuoka Prefectural Route 155 (Takigahara–Fujioka Line), Shizuoka Prefectural Route 157 (Gomoto–Gotemba Line)
- Rail: JR Central Gotemba Line Gotemba Station
- Bus Routes: Fujikyu Mobility J1 Jūriku Line, J2 Gurinpa Line, Itatsuma–Kamiba Loop Line, Inno-Honmura Line (via Itatsuma), Kitanohara Loop Line, Kamiba-Minami Loop Line (Itatsuma Bus Stop)
- Ports: Shimizu Port (Specified Important Port), Tagonoura Port, Yokohama Port (both Important Ports)
