= International Peace Cooperation Activities Training Unit =

International Peace Cooperation Activities Training and Education Unit
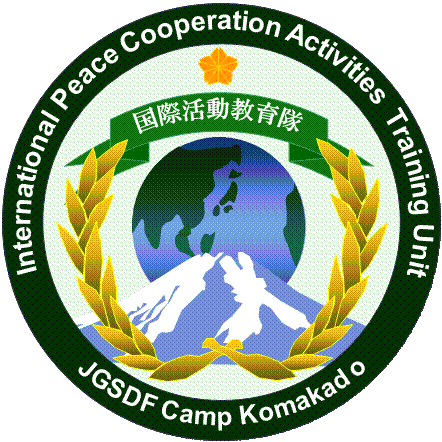
- Active: March 28, 2007 - Present
- Country: Japan
- Branch: Japan Ground Self-Defense Force
- Type: Military Training unit
- Role: Military Direct Action & Peacekeeping education unit
- Size: 80 soldiers
- Part of: Central Readiness Force (Former); Ground Component Command (Current)
- Garrison/HQ: Camp Komakado, Shizuoka
- Nickname: IPCATng

Commanders
- Current commander: Colonel Hiroyuki Yokoyama
- Notable commanders: Colonel Masakazu Karube; Colonel Mizuho Akiba

The International Peace Cooperation Activities Training Unit (国際活動教育隊, kokusai katsudō kyōiku tai) is the Japanese Ground Self-Defense Forces's training unit to prepare JGSDF soldiers by training them in scenarios that would require the mobilization of JGSDF forces in other countries. It is based in the JGSDF's Camp Komakado in Shizuoka Prefecture.

The IPCATng aims to have 240 soldiers graduate from the unit's training program annually.

Colonel Karube says training with the IPCATng is an "important point is to verify whether the training now being conducted can really be useful in theaters of activity overseas and to develop unified know-how for personnel education."

The unit has invited lecturers from NGOs and universities to participate in IPCATng seminars.

== History ==
The IPCATU was established on March 28, 2007. A special ceremony was established on September 19, 2008, to inaugurate the beginning of the unit's first official training program. This was based on the experience of the JGSDF in reconstruction work in Samawa, Iraq in the early 2000s.

The unit had been established in conjunction with the Central Readiness Force to the need of educating JGSDF forces to properly conduct operations in foreign soil. Its first commander was Colonel Masakazu Karube, who was unit commander from March 28, 2007, to March 25, 2009.

On April 4, 2018, the unit responded to an inquiry from the Diet that they do not keep any documentation related to the JGSDF's activities in South Sudan when then Defense Minister Itsunori Onodera answered questions from reporters. A Diet inquiry under the Diet Security Committee on May 10, 2018, mentioned that a search was conducted in the IPCATng offices in relation to accusation that Tomomi Inada covered up events in South Sudan that conditions on the grounds are getting dangerous for JGSDF soldiers to continue their peacekeeping work.

As of 2019, the IPCATng has been under the command of the Ground Component Command after the CRF was abolished.

On April 1, 2021, the unit conducted the 2nd International Peace Cooperation Activities Seminar (IPCAS) online due to COVID-19 concerns.

== Training ==
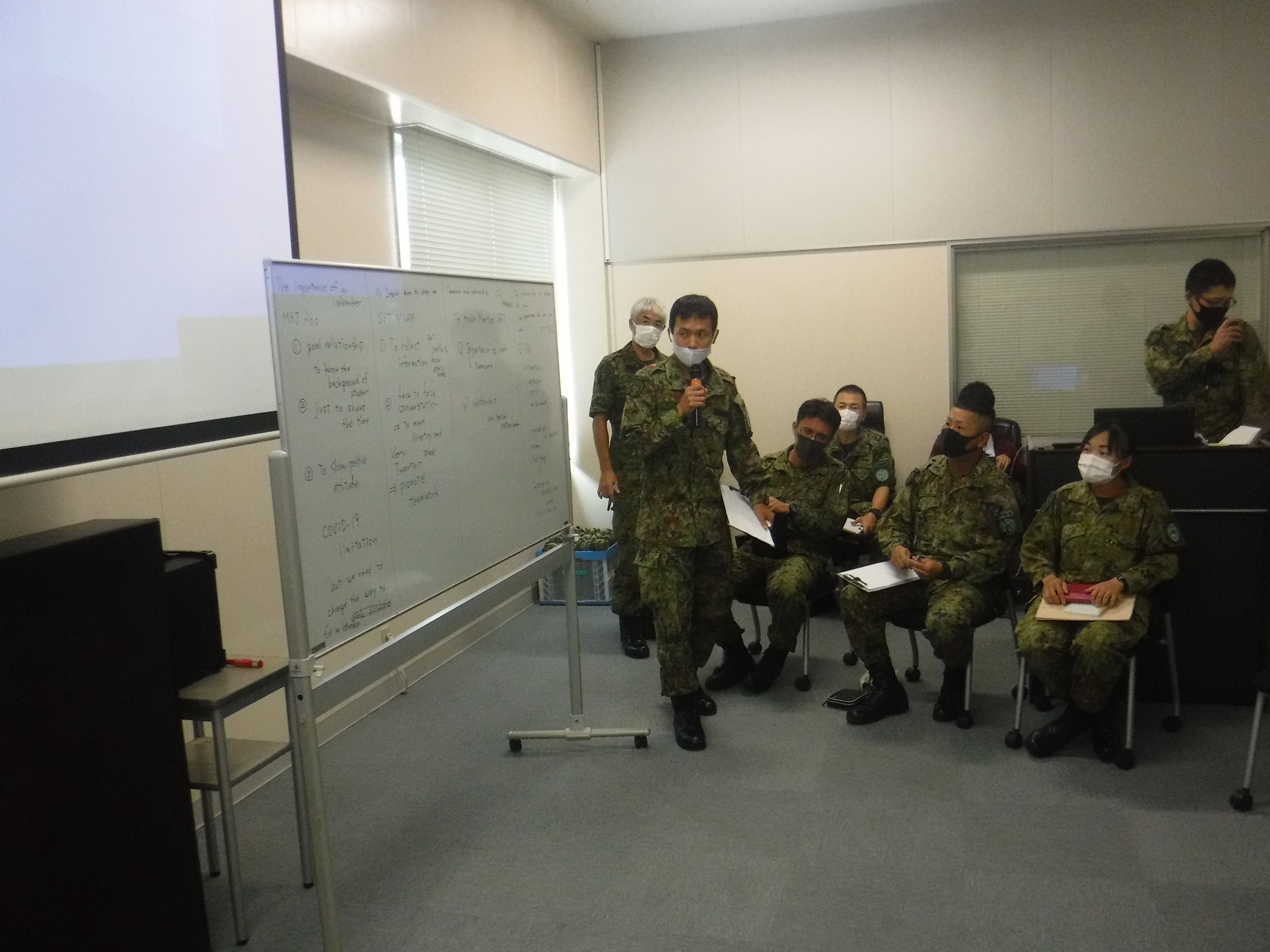
JGSDF soldiers attend language courses at the IPCAT.

Training under the IPCATng lasts for one month with graduates expecting to serve overseas in potential peacekeeping operations. All participants are required then to attend a review session after each training session is complete. The International Peace Cooperation Activities Seminar (IPCAS) is held once a year where the JSDF participates with research organizations, NGOs and government offices in research on civil-military affairs in conflict and post-conflict.

The IPCATng also provides support for the Ministry of Foreign Affairs in peacebuilding development since 2008 for civilian peacebuiliding operations. They also provide peacekeeping capacity building to friendly countries.

== Formation ==
The IPCATng has the following structure:

Commander

- Headquarters - Command Sergeant Major
  - Education Division
  - Evaluation Division
  - Research Division
  - Education and Training Support Platoon
