= Central Readiness Force =

- 中央即応集団; Chūō Sokuō Shūdan
- Central Readiness Force insignia
- Active: March 28, 2007 – March 26, 2018
- Country: Japan
- Branch: Japan Ground Self-Defense Force
- Type: Rapid Reaction Force
- Size: ≈4,500 personnel
- Garrison/HQ: Camp Zama, Sagamihara, Kanagawa Prefecture
- Nickname: CRF
- Engagements: United Nations Mission in Nepal; United Nations Integrated Mission in East Timor; United Nations Disengagement Observer Force Zone; United Nations Stabilisation Mission in Haiti; Counter-piracy operations in Somalia

Commanders
- Notable commanders: Lt. Gen. Josho Yamaguchi

The Central Readiness Force (中央即応集団, Chūō Sokuō Shūdan) was established on March 28, 2007, following the upgrading of the Japanese Defense Ministry from the former Japanese Defense Agency. It was initially based at Japan Ground Self-Defense Force (JGSDF) Camp Asaka in Nerima, Tokyo.

The command supervised a number of different units, whose roles ranged from special forces operations to advance preparation for greater JSDF deployments. The unit could also be deployed as Japan's response to combat operations during peacekeeping missions as a rapid reaction force.

On 26 March 2013, the force was officially transferred to Camp Zama, in Sagamihara, in the Kanagawa Prefecture. As a part of the Japanese government's National Defense Program Guidelines which were developed in response to the need to improve the JGSDF's capabilities to deal with new defense issues such as foreign peacekeeping operations and anti-terrorist operations.

The CRF held a formal ceremony at Camp Askaka on March 31, 2007, during which Japanese Defense Minister Fumio Kyuma, who was the guest of honour, formally inaugurated the force. Lieutenant General Josho Yamaguchi (山口淨秀 陸将; Yamaguchi Josho Rikushō) was the CRF's first commanding officer. The last commander of the CRF was Lt. Gen. Shigeru Kobayashi, who was appointed on July 1, 2016.

The CRF was officially disbanded on March 26, 2018 with most of its subordinate units restructured and integrated into the newly established Ground Component Command.

== History ==
Formed on March 28, 2007, the CRF was established, consolidating the 1st Airborne Brigade, the 1st Helicopter Brigade, the Japanese Special Forces Group and the 101st NBC Protection Unit into a single force capable of conduct operations both in Japan and in foreign countries. On March 31, 2007, the Central Readiness Force held a formal inauguration ceremony at JGSDF Camp Asaka in Nerima, Tokyo, which included guests such as Fumio Kyuma and Josho Yamaguchi, the former presiding over the formal establishment of the CRF.

The CRF was deployed on its first civil disaster mission on April 29, 2007, when it was dispatched to quell wildfires in the forests of the Yamanashi Prefecture, with the 1st Helicopter Brigade being deployed after its integration to the force. The CRF later conducted a military exercise on October 31, 2007, with its subordinate units participating in a wide range of scenarios from anti-NBC cleanup to personnel transportation and evacuation.

Six officers from the CRF were deployed to Nepal as part of the United Nations Mission in Nepal on March 30, 2007, as part of their first CRF peacekeeping mission.] A CRF officer deployed to Nepal as part of the UNMIN was decorated for completing his duties in monitoring the ceasefire between the Nepalese government and Maoist rebels. The officers returned to Japan on March 18, 2008. Four CRF officers under the UNDOF's transport unit were deployed to France as Japanese representatives on July 14, 2008, for its annual Bastille Day Military Parade celebration. The CRF was deployed to assist in the aftermath of the Tōhoku earthquake and tsunami in humanitarian relief efforts, as well as to combat radiation problems at the Fukushima nuclear power plant.

The CRF has been deployed in Djibouti in the Horn of Africa. Asahi Shimbun wrote in January 2015 of plans to reinforce the JSDF base in Djibouti, Africa including mobilizing light armored vehicles to rescue Japanese citizens by land routes.

The CRF was disbanded on 26 March 2018 resulting in the units previously under its authority, with the exception of Special Forces Group (replaced by the Amphibious Rapid Deployment Brigade), being restructured and integrated into the newly formed Ground Component Command (陸上総隊) based at Camp Asaka on 27 March 2018.

== Command Group ==
Position	Name (Japanese)	Rank	Day of Appointment	Previous Position
Commanding General	Shigeru Kobayashi (小林茂)	Lieutenant General	July 1, 2016	Vice-president, National Defense Academy
Vice Commanding General	(橋爪良友)	Major General	March 27, 2017	Vice Chief of Staff, Central Army
Vice Commanding General	(野村悟)	Major General	March 27, 2017	Chief of Staff, 8th Division
Chief of Staff	(豊田真)	Colonel	December 18, 2015	Commander, 10th Engineer Group (Construction)
Vice Chief of Staff	(宮嵜浩一)	Colonel	August 1, 2016	Commander, Camp Rumoi and 26th Infantry Regiment
Vice Chief of Staff	(仲川剛)	Colonel	March 23, 2017	Chief of Staff, 13th Brigade

== Structure ==
The structure of the CRF has been created with the following established for its headquarters:

=== Chain of command ===
- Commander (Lieutenant General)
  - Deputy Commander for Domestic Operations (Major General)
  - Deputy Commander for International Operations (Major General)
- Chief of Staff (Colonel)
- Vice Chief of Staff (2 officers with rank of Colonel)

=== Divisions ===
- Personnel
- Intelligence
- Defense Plans & Operations
- Logistics
- Administration
- Accounting
- Communications
- National Welfare

=== Personnel ===
- Reporting Officer
- Army Surgeon
- Inspector
- Law Officer
- Staff Manager
- Adjutant

== Formation ==
The following is the formation of the CRF in 2017:

- Headquarters – Camp Zama (since March 2013), Sagamihara, Kanagawa
  - 1st Airborne Brigade – Camp Narashino, Funabashi, Chiba
  - Central Readiness Regiment – Camp Utsunomiya, Utsunomiya, Tochigi – the Central Readiness Regiment (CRR) has the ability to form advance missions to conduct preparations for main JSDF missions
  - Japanese Special Forces Group – Camp Narashino, Funabashi, Chiba
  - 1st Helicopter Brigade – Camp Kisarazu, Kisarazu, Chiba
  - Central Nuclear Biological Chemical Weapon Defense Unit – Camp Ōmiya, Kita-ku, Saitama with 155 personnel
  - NBC Counter Medical Unit – Camp Asaka, Nerima, Tokyo with 70 personnel
  - International Peace Cooperation Activities Training Unit – Camp Komakado, Gotemba, Shizuoka

== Symbols ==
The following are represented in the insignia and patch of the Central Readiness Force:

=== CRF insignia ===
The official insignia of the Central Readiness Force.

Japanese Archipelago and Red Circle surrounding it – CRF's mandate to operate in Japanese soil.

Laurel – Hope for a successful mission.

Purple Shadow – CRF's joint cooperation with the Japanese Ground Self-Defense Forces, the Japanese Maritime Self-Defense Forces and the Japanese Air Self-Defense Forces.

The insignia symbolizes the CRF's mandate to operate in Japanese soil.

=== CRF patch ===
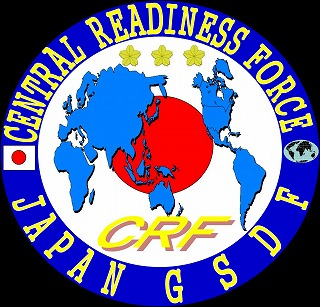
The official patch of the Central Readiness Force.

Globe – CRF's mandate to operate anywhere around the world.

Cherry Blossoms – CRF's commanding officer.

Red Circle – Japan.

The patch symbolizes the CRF's mandate to operate in foreign territory as a representative of Japan in Peacekeeping missions.
