= 1st Division (Japan) =

- 第1師団
- 1st Division Distinctive Unit Insignia
- Active: 18 January 1962 – present
- Country: Japan
- Branch: Japan Ground Self-Defense Force
- Type: Infantry division
- Size: 6,500 soldiers (As of 2023)
- Part of: Eastern Army
- Garrison/HQ: Camp Nerima, Nerima, Tokyo
- Nickname: Leader Division (頭号師団)

Commanders
- Current commander: Lt. Gen. Yasuyuki Kodama

The 1st Division (第1師団, Dai-Ichi Shidan) is one of nine active divisions of the Japan Ground Self-Defense Force. The division is subordinated to the Eastern Army and is headquartered at Camp Nerima in Nerima, Tokyo. Its responsibility is the defense of Tokyo and the Chiba, Ibaraki, Kanagawa, Saitama, Shizuoka and Yamanashi prefectures.

== History ==
The division was raised on 18 January 1962 but dates back to the 1st District Corps (Tokyo) of the then National Police Reserve formed in 1950 and reformed in 1962 as an Infantry Division.

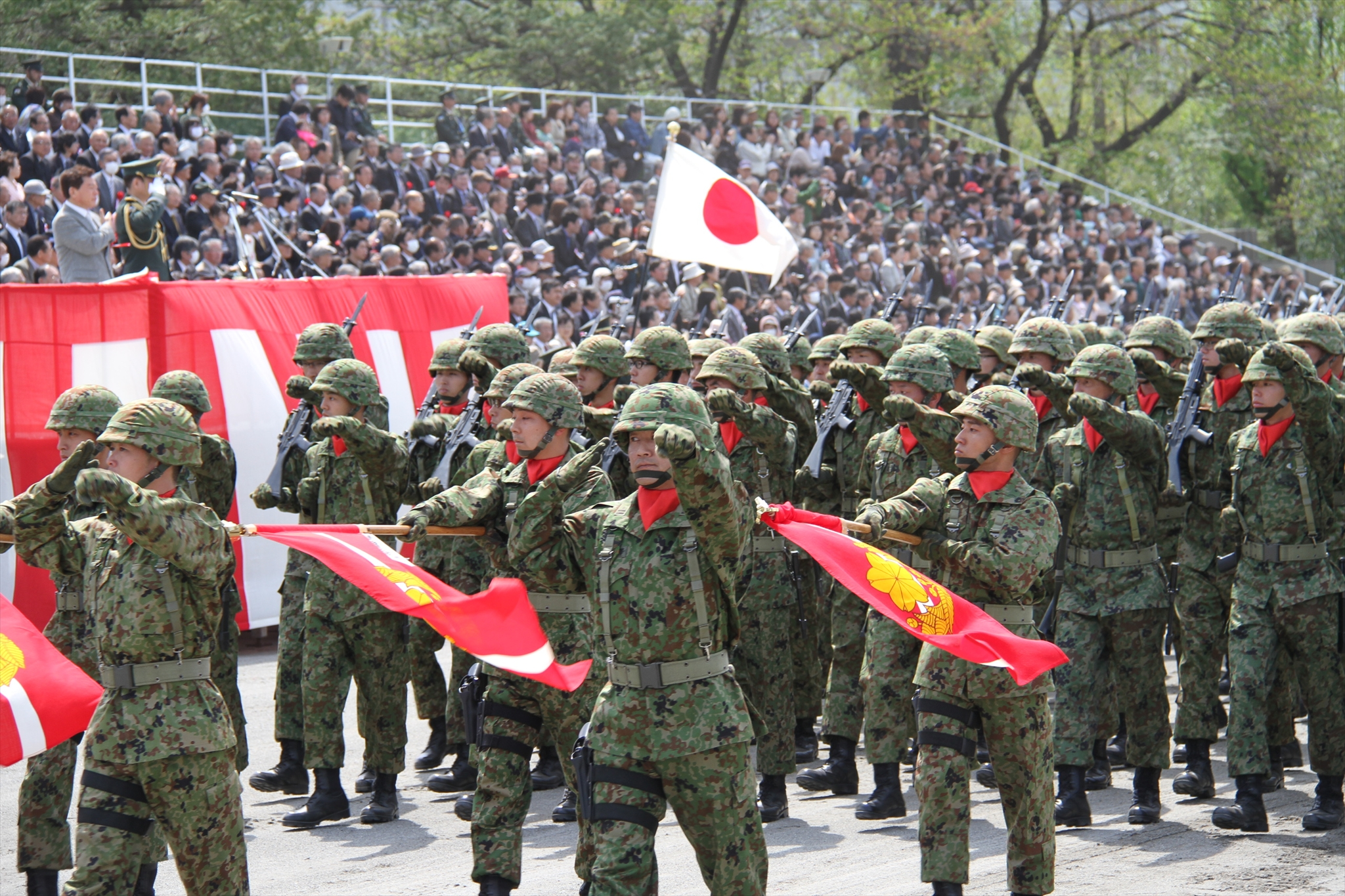
Watching march of the event of the 62nd anniversary of Nerima Gemini founding 51st anniversary of the founding of the 1st Division (April 14, 2013)

== Organization ==
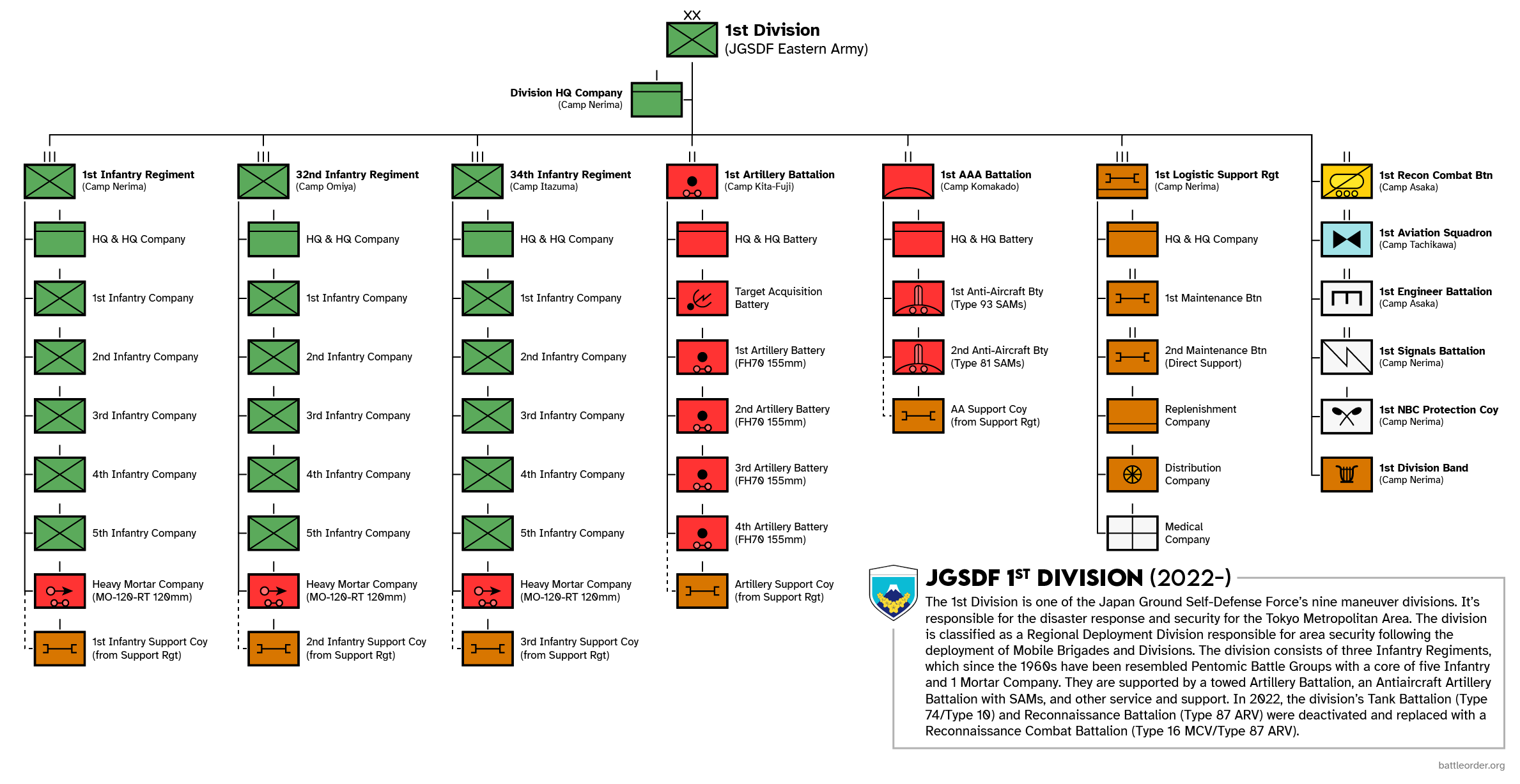
JGSDF 1st Division organization in 2022

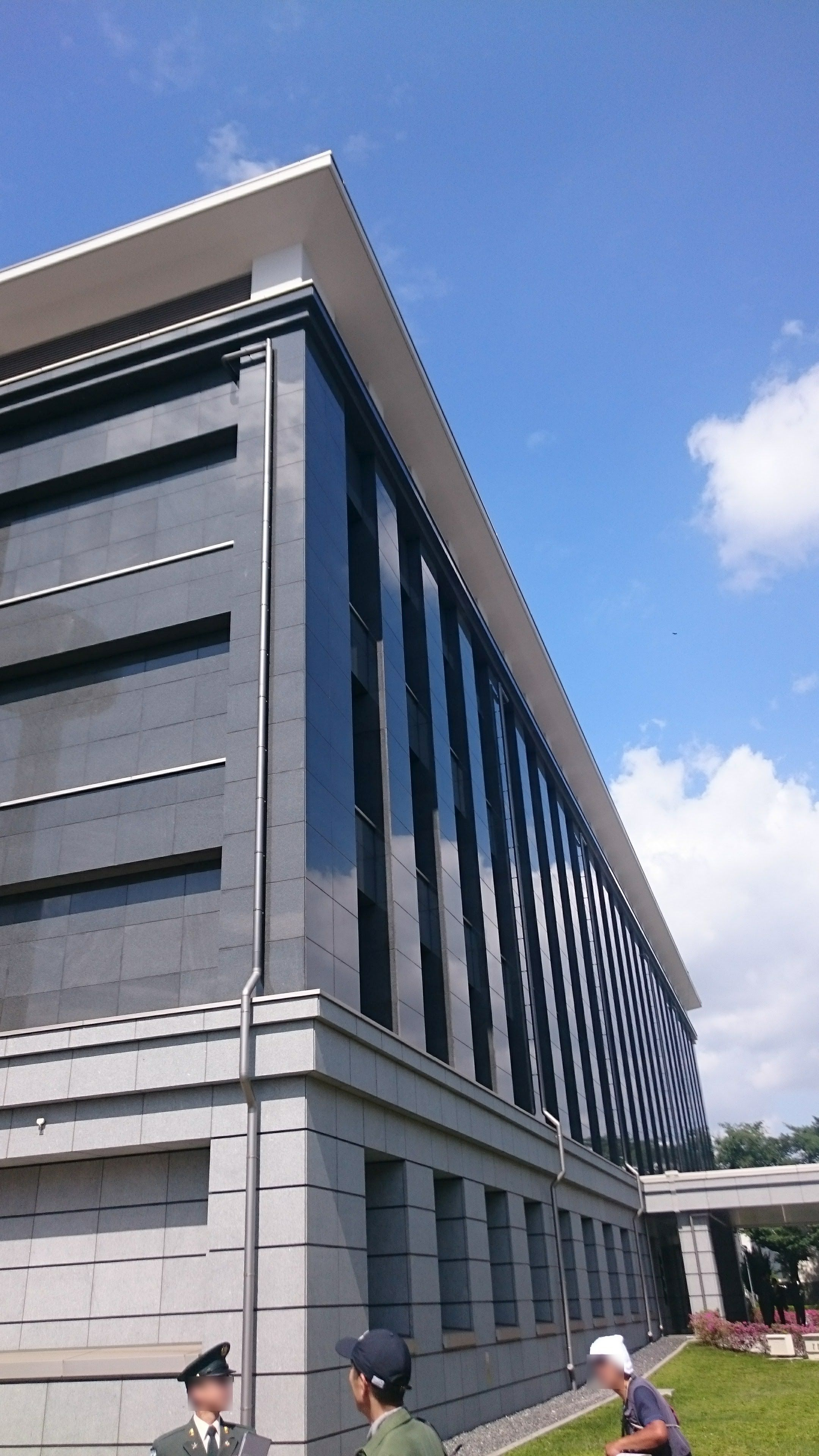
HQ building at Camp Nerima (May 19, 2019)

- 1st Division, in Nerima
  - 1st Division HQ, in Nerima
  - 1st Infantry Regiment ^{note 1}, in Nerima, with five infantry and one heavy mortar company
  - 32nd Infantry Regiment, in Saitama, with five infantry and one heavy mortar company
  - 34th Infantry Regiment, in Gotemba, with five infantry and one heavy mortar company
  - 1st Reconnaissance Combat Battalion, in Asaka, with Type 16 maneuver combat vehicles, and Type 87 armored reconnaissance vehicles
  - 1st Anti-Aircraft Artillery Battalion, in Gotemba, with a Type 81 and a Type 93 surface-to-air missile squadron
  - 1st Engineer Battalion (Combat), in Asaka
  - 1st Signal Battalion, in Nerima
  - 1st Aviation Squadron, at Tachikawa Airfield
  - 1st NBC Protection Company, in Nerima
  - 1st Logistic Support Regiment, in Nerima
    - 1st Maintenance Battalion
    - 2nd Maintenance Battalion
    - Supply Company
    - Medical Company
    - Transport Company

note 1: Infantry regiments have only battalion strength.
