= Hayao Kinugasa =

Japanese general (1915–2007)

- 衣笠 駿雄
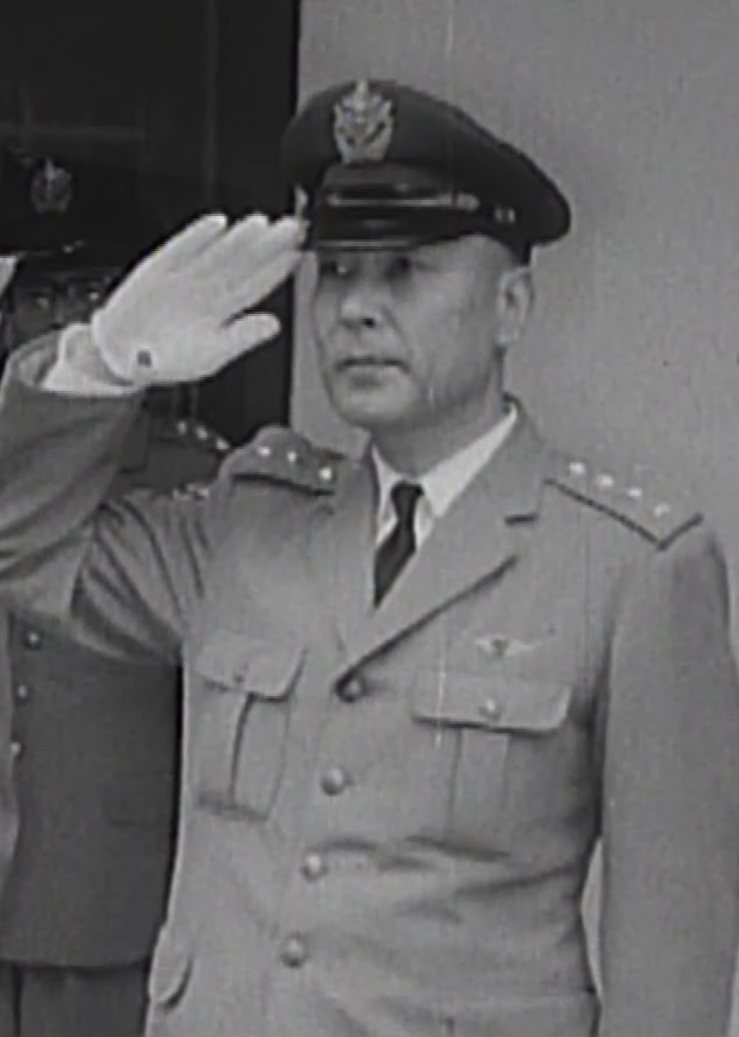
- Born: February 2, 1915; Hyōgo, Japan
- Died: February 11, 2007 (aged 92)
- Military career
- Allegiance: Empire of Japan; Japan
- Branch: Imperial Japanese Army
- Rank: General
- Commands: 1st Airborne Brigade; JGSDF's 3rd Infantry Division
- Conflicts: World War II
- Awards: Order of the Sacred Treasure

Hayao Kinugasa (衣笠駿雄, Kinugasa Hayao; February 2, 1915 – February 11, 2007) was a Japanese military officer who served in the Imperial Japanese Army during the Second World War and post-war joined up with the Japanese Self-Defense Forces (JGSDF) and its predecessor forces, namely the National Police Reserve (NPR). In the course of his career, he served in the JSDF's Joint Staff Council and was the first commander of the 1st Airborne Brigade before he retired to private life.

== History ==
Born on February 2, 1915, in Hyōgo Prefecture, he attended the Army's military academy in Narashino in 1936 before graduating in 1941. In 1942, Hayao was an instructor in the Imperial Japanese Army Academy. He was then promoted to major in 1943 and was later assigned to the Imperial Japanese Army's Imperial General Headquarters from 1944 to 1945.

After the dissolution of the Imperial Japanese Army with the rest of the Imperial Military, Hayao joined up with the NPR in 1951. In 1954, he was instrumental in the eventual formation of the 1st Airborne Brigade and continued to enhance the brigade until 1955. In 1957, he was made captain of this brigade and was eventually made the unit's first commanding officer in 1958. Later, Hayao was assigned to the JSDF's Ground Staff office from 1959 to 1960. He was then appointed as an instructor in the JGSDF's Aviation School and was an infantry commander of the JGSDF's 3rd Infantry Division in the JGSDF's Middle Army. In 1969, he was made Vice Chief of Staff before appointed as the 9th chief of staff after his predecessor resigned due to Yukio Mishima's actions after invading the former Defense Agency in 1970. In 1971, Hayao was appointed as the 9th chairman of the Joint Chiefs of Staff before retiring to private life in 1973.

== Private life ==
In 1985, Hayao was awarded the Order of the Sacred Treasures for his services in the Japanese Self-Defense Forces. After living years of obscurity in Japanese society, he eventually died on February 11, 2007 of heart failure. He was 91 years old.

Military offices
| Preceded by Ryuichi Itaya | Chairman of the Joint Staff Council; Japan Self-Defense Forces; 1971-1973 | Succeeded by Ryuhei Nakamura |
| Preceded by Masao Yamada | Chief of Staff; Japan Ground Self-Defense Force; 1970-1971 | Succeeded by Ryuhei Nakamura |
