= 1st Airborne Brigade (Japan) =

- 1st Airborne Brigade Shoulder Sleeve Patch
- Active: June 25, 1958 – present
- Country: Japan
- Branch: Japan Ground Self-Defense Force
- Type: Airborne forces
- Size: 1,900 soldiers
- Part of: Ground Component Command (陸上総隊)
- Garrison/HQ: Camp Narashino, Funabashi, Chiba
- Nicknames: Narashino Airborne Brigade, 1AB
- Motto: The Matchless Elite Second To None (精鋭無比)
- Engagements: Iraq War

Commanders
- Current commander: Maj. Gen. Yoshitaka Ishihara (MAR 2025)
- Notable commanders: Hayao Kinugasa; Yoshifumi Hibako; Satoshi Mizuno; Yosihiko Doi; Ken'ichi Kinomura; Shizuo Sekine

The 1st Airborne Brigade (第1空挺団, Dai-Ichi Kūtei Dan), also known as the Narashino Airborne Brigade (習志野空挺団), is stationed in the Japan Ground Self-Defense Force (JGSDF) Camp Narashino in Funabashi, Chiba Prefecture.

The Brigade serves as Japan's elite paratrooper unit meant to counter against enemy airborne forces units, commandos, guerrilla warfare, and irregular military units. Since 1999, the Brigade has a Guide Unit (誘導隊, Yūdō-tai), serving as its NEO (Non-combatant Evacuation Operations) unit. Currently, they are attached to current homeland defense and international combat operations under the JGSDF's Ground Component Command (Japanese: 陸上総隊) (formerly under the Central Readiness Force).

== History ==
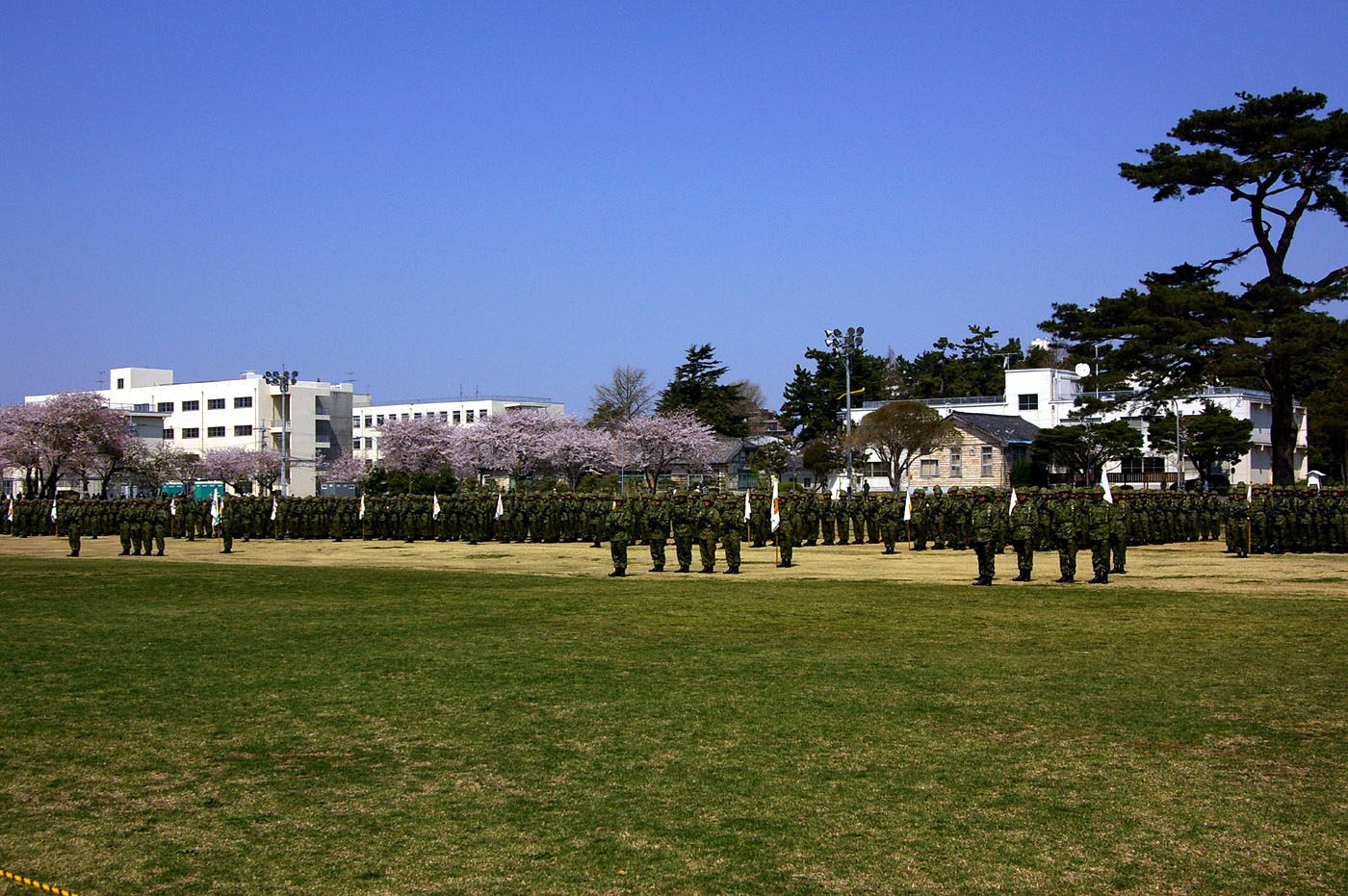
1st Airborne Brigade paratroopers in formation in the grounds of Camp Narashino.

In 1958, the Airborne Brigade's first platoon was formed after Hayao Kinugasa was made the first commander of the unit. It continued to increase in numbers as ranger and free-fall training were added in 1962 and 1969. An additional armed transport unit was established in 1973.

In 1985, the 1st Airborne Brigade was involved in rescue operations of the downed Japan Air Lines Flight 123 in the ridges of Mount Takamagahara in Gunma Prefecture after the local volunteer fire corps found some survivors, marking the first time that the Brigade was seen in the public eye. Later on, they were also deployed in Yamanashi Prefecture for civil operations and after the Great Hanshin-Awaji earthquake in 1995.

A Guide Unit was established on October 20, 1999, and based at Funabashi, Chiba. Preparations to create a new special forces unit went underway in the Brigade in 2000. In 2003, the framework of the Special Operations Group was established as an anti-guerrilla/terrorist unit embedded in the Brigade, but was established and separated from the Brigade in 2004 and placed under the control of the Defense Agency via the JGSDF like most of the JSDF's special forces units.

Brigade paratroopers were involved in Iraq as the Brigade rotated ground personnel as part of the Japanese government's commitment to Iraq. They were withdrawn alongside the bulk of the Japanese Iraqi Reconstruction Support Group in the middle of 2006. The brigade was added to the Central Readiness Force on March 28, 2007.

On October 9, 2006, members of the Oregon National Guard had a hand in assisting soldiers of the 1st Airborne Brigade in establishing a sniper school to train the unit's first generation of highly skilled snipers during Orient Shield '07.

In March 2018, the brigade was integrated into the Ground Component Command after the Central Readiness Force was disbanded.

On March 4, 2020, the brigade recruited Sergeant Reina Hashiba, the first female paratrooper who passed selection process.

During the COVID-19 outbreak in Japan, the brigade has conducted protective measures by letting its paratroopers wear facemasks and limiting the presence of spectators with its first exercise on January 13, 2021.

In June 2025, the brigade was issued maroon berets.

=== Scandals ===
==== Firearms handling ====
In 1994, Colonel Yasunobu Hideshima was arrested by JGSDF military police officers for violating both the Self-Defense Forces Law and the Firearm and Sword Control Law when he allowed three of his friends to use JGSDF firearms without prior authorization. Lieutenant Colonels Yoshiharu Amano and Michihiko Suzuki were suspended for 20 days for neglect of duty.

==== Iraq War ====
Another scandal emerged from within the unit when a 38-year-old 1st Airborne Brigade paratrooper was arrested in Inzai, Chiba Prefecture for shoplifting. He admitted to officers that he did it to demonstrate that he was serious in his effort to avoid deployment to Iraq. When JGSDF officials heard about this, they told press officials that they require the consent of the troopers and their relatives. Otherwise, they would not be deployed. The Iraq deployment had caused a national debate in Japan, and a new public consensus was necessary for the military to develop a modern role and structure.

==== Assault ====
A brigade paratrooper was disciplined for bringing a lighter to the dorms at Camp Narashino when it was used to burn the feet of his two juniors.

== Requirements ==
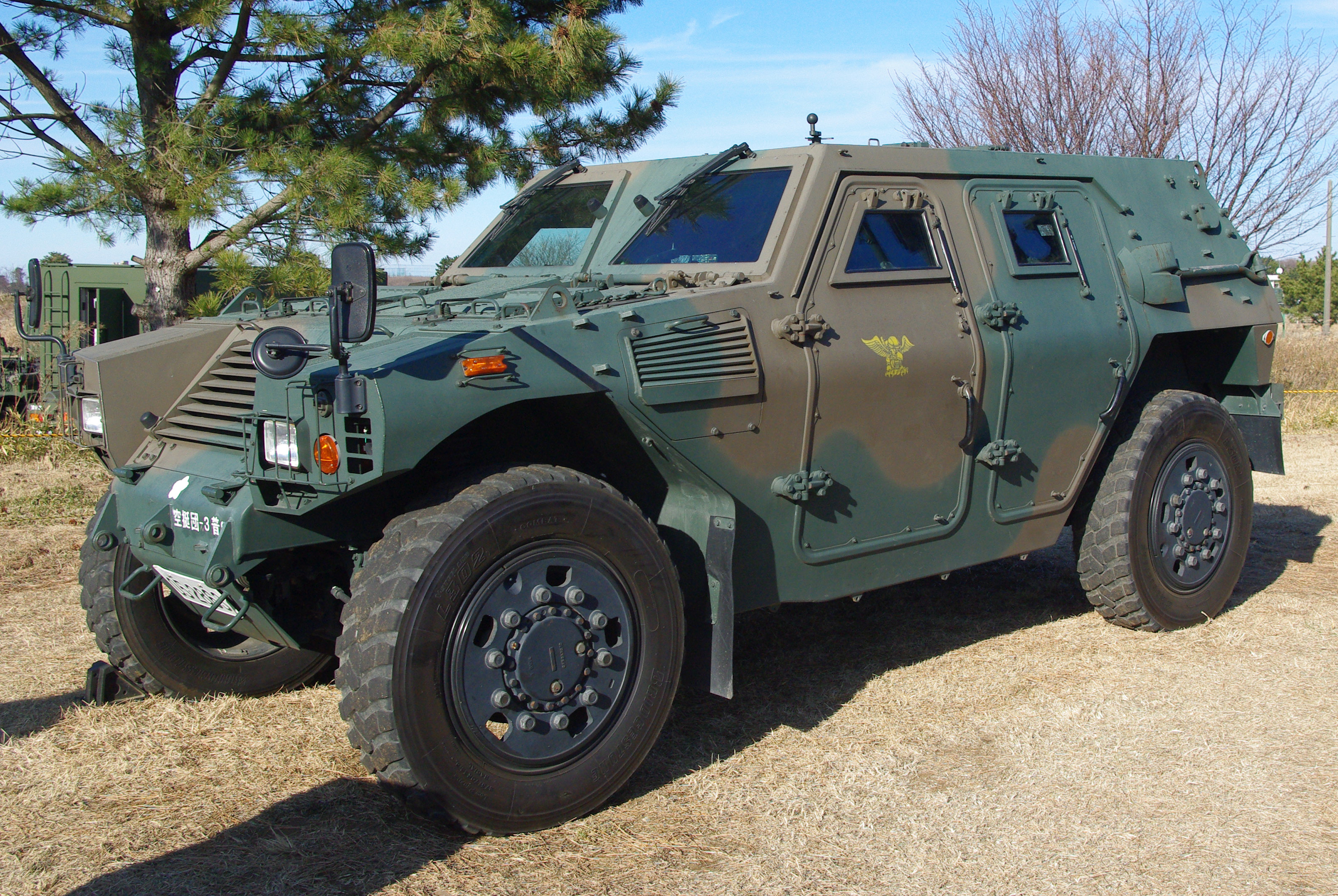
Komatsu LAV (Light Armored Vehicle) on display with 1st Airborne Brigade markings.

Before joining the 1st Airborne Brigade, all potential candidates must be able to pass the following requirements:

- Join the Brigade on or under 28 if a private; otherwise NCOs (usually Sergeants) must join on or under 36 years of age.
- Have at least the standard weight and height of 49 kg and 161 cm with chest measurements at 78.5 cm
- Lung capacity of at least 3,200 cm^{3} or more
- Have no criminal record
- Have the following points from his time in the JGSDF:
  - 5 classes or more, 1st method above various eye minimum of 45 points
  - Airborne system has been above each minimum of 60 points of 5 items such as suspension stopping jump from aircraft.
- Must be able to lift objects at 30 kg, under, and above for 50 s
- Blood pressure must be at 140mmHg~100mmHg and 90mmHg to candidates who are 34 years old or less.

=== Ranger qualification ===
1AB paratroopers receive ranger qualification at part of their training. The Ranger badge is highly sought by active duty JSDF personnel.

== Structure ==
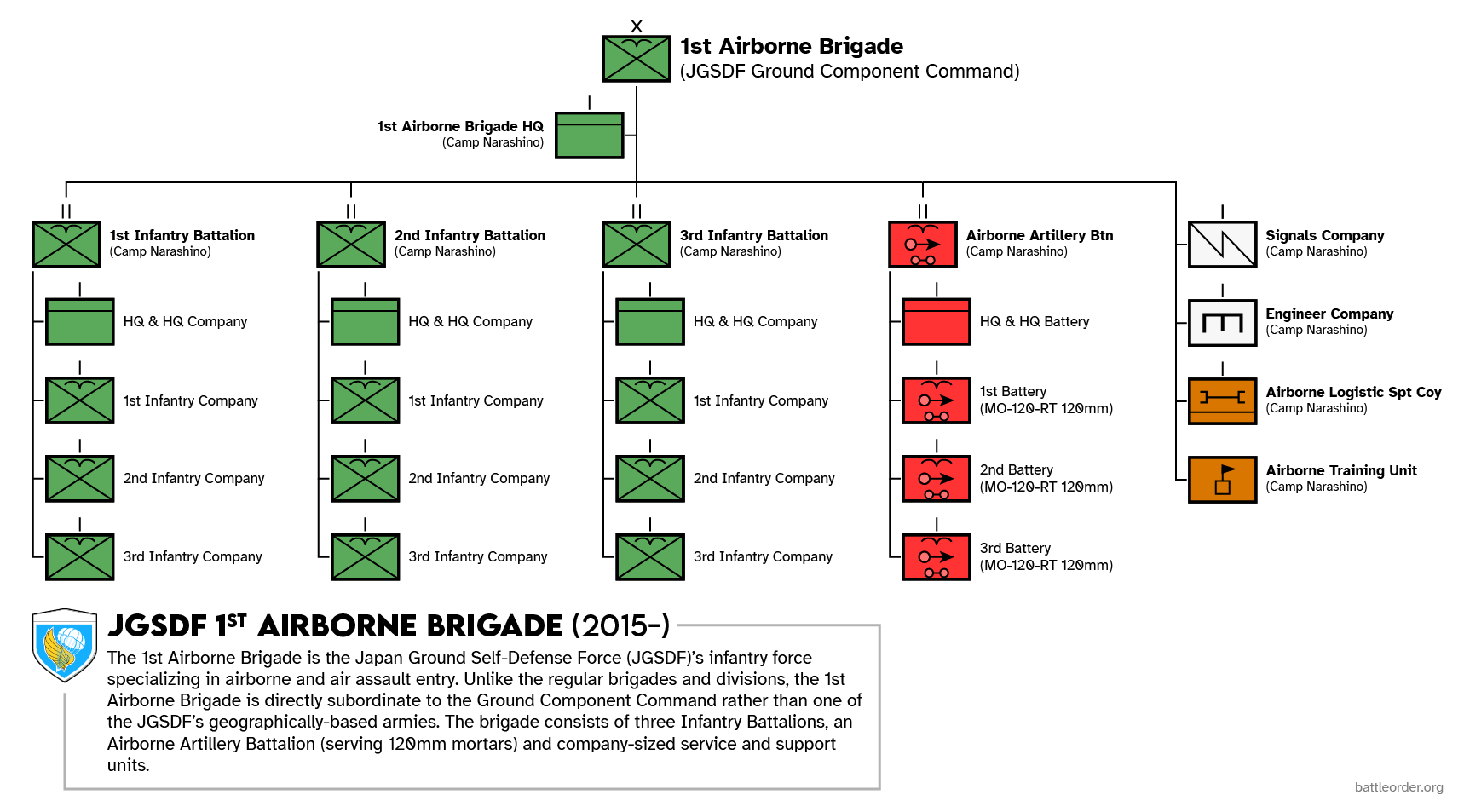
JGSDF 1st Airborne Brigade organization

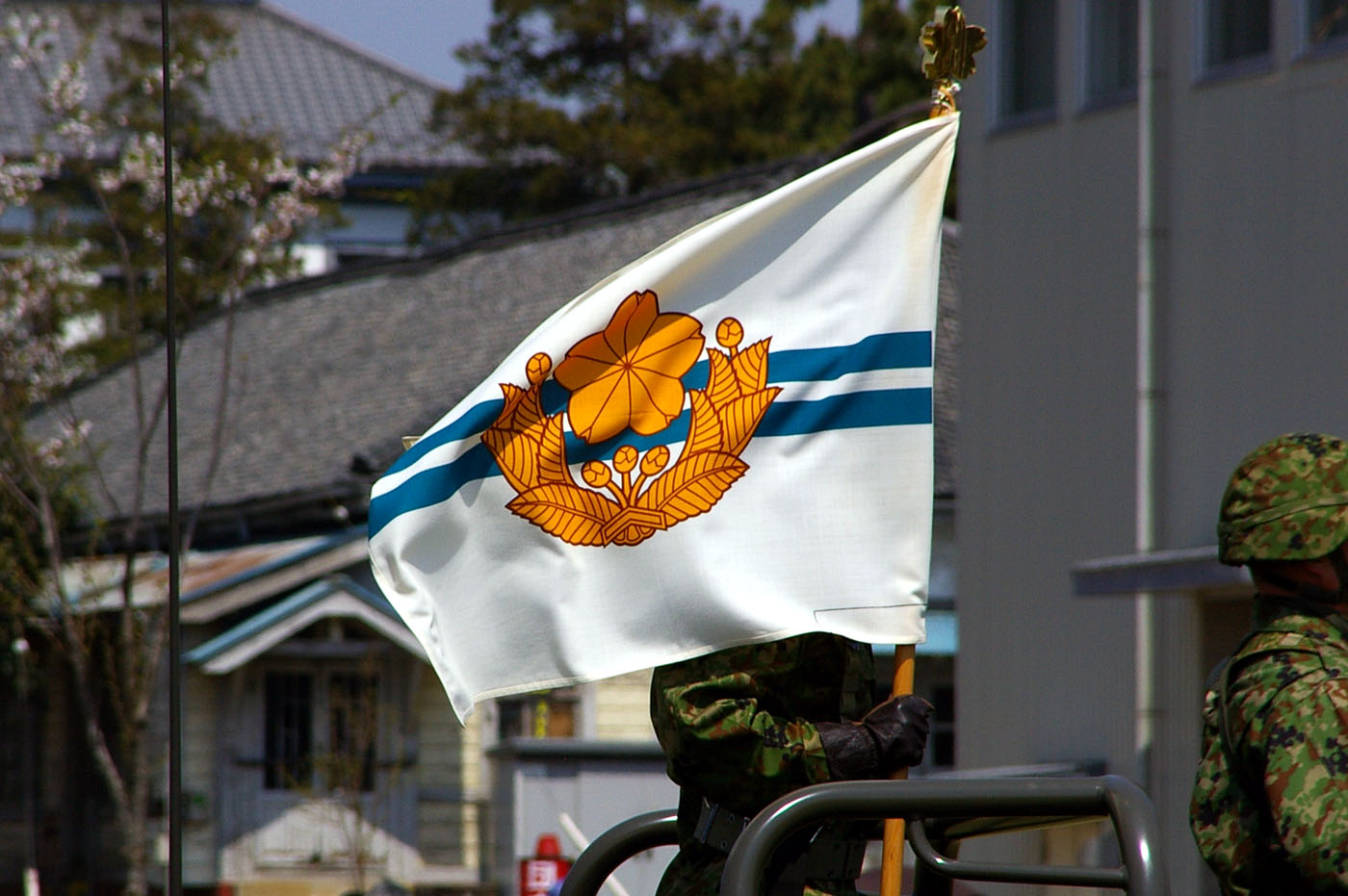
JGSDF 1st Airborne Brigade Battalion Type flag.

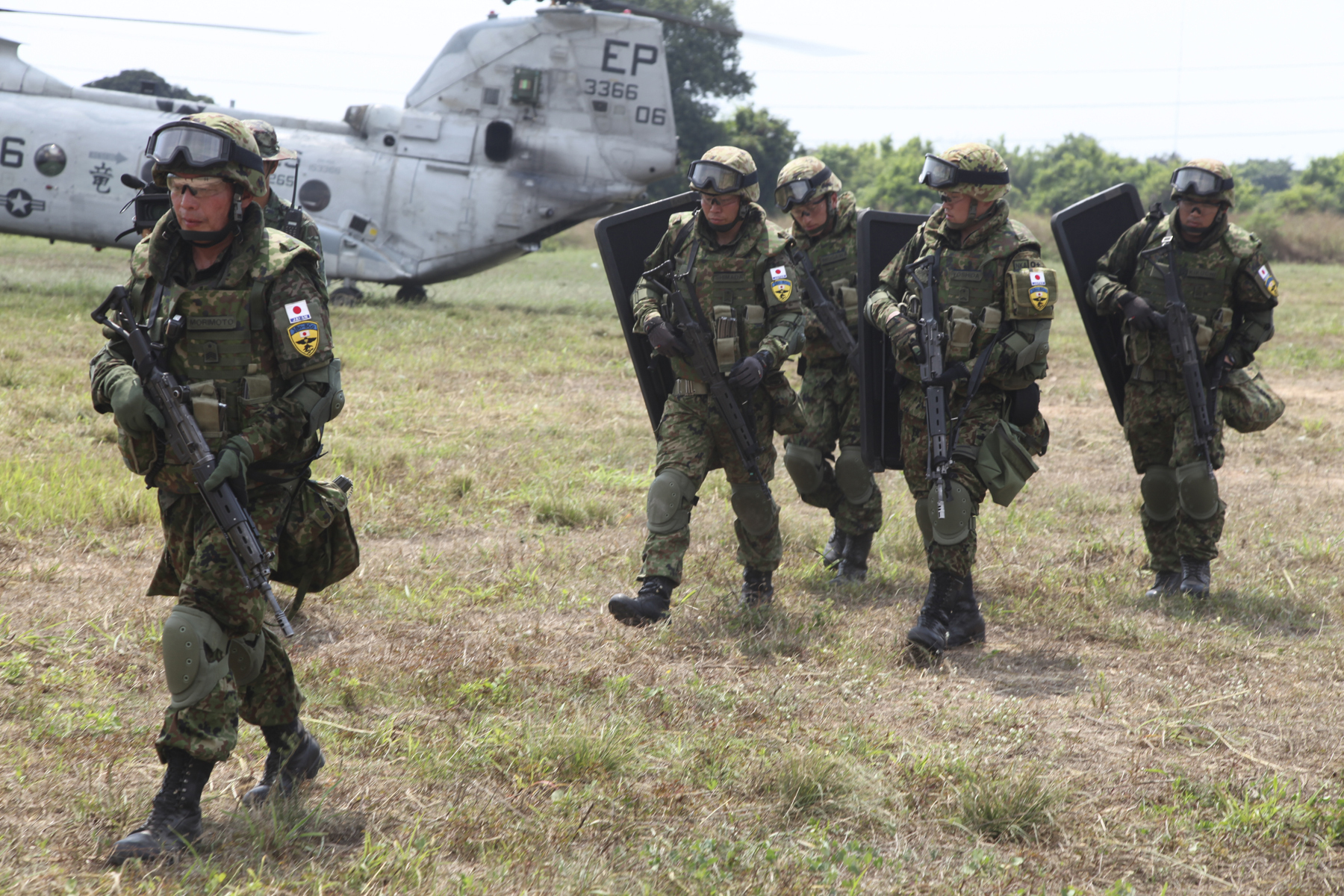
Members of the 1st Airborne Brigade who participated in the Cobra Gold exercise (2012)

The brigade's structure is as follows:

- 1st Airborne Brigade, in Funabashi
  - Brigade Headquarters Company, in Funabashi
    - Reconnaissance Platoon
    - Pathfinders Platoon
  - 1st Infantry Battalion (Airborne), in Funabashi
    - Headquarters Company
      - Reconnaissance Platoon
      - Anti-tank Platoon
      - Signals Platoon
    - 1st Infantry Company
    - 2nd Infantry Company
    - 3rd Infantry Company
  - 2nd Infantry Battalion (Airborne), in Funabashi
    - Headquarters Company
      - Reconnaissance Platoon
      - Anti-tank Platoon
      - Signals Platoon
    - 4th Infantry Company
    - 5th Infantry Company
    - 6th Infantry Company
  - 3rd Infantry Battalion (Airborne), in Funabashi
    - Headquarters Company
      - Reconnaissance Platoon
      - Anti-tank Platoon
      - Signals Platoon
    - 7th Infantry Company
    - 8th Infantry Company
    - 9th Infantry Company
  - Airborne Artillery Battalion, in Funabashi
    - Headquarters Battery
    - 1st Battery, with F1 120 mm mortars
    - 2nd Battery, with F1 120 mm mortars
    - 3rd Battery, with F1 120 mm mortars
  - Signals Company, in Funabashi
  - Engineer Company, in Funabashi
  - Airborne Training Unit, in Funabashi
  - Logistic Support Battalion, in Funabashi
    - Headquarters Company
      - Supply Platoon
      - Medical Platoon
    - Maintenance Company
    - Parachute Maintenance Company

== Weapons ==
Standard weapons are from the JGSDF, including:

- Howa Type 89-F (Para) rifle
- SIG Sauer P220 pistol
- Minebea PM-9 submachine gun
- Remington M24 sniper rifle
- Sumitomo Heavy Industries M249 LMG
- Toshiba Type 91 Mobile SAM launcher
- Kawasaki Type 01 LMAT, a man-portable fire-and-forget anti-tank missile

== Deployment ==
=== Local ===
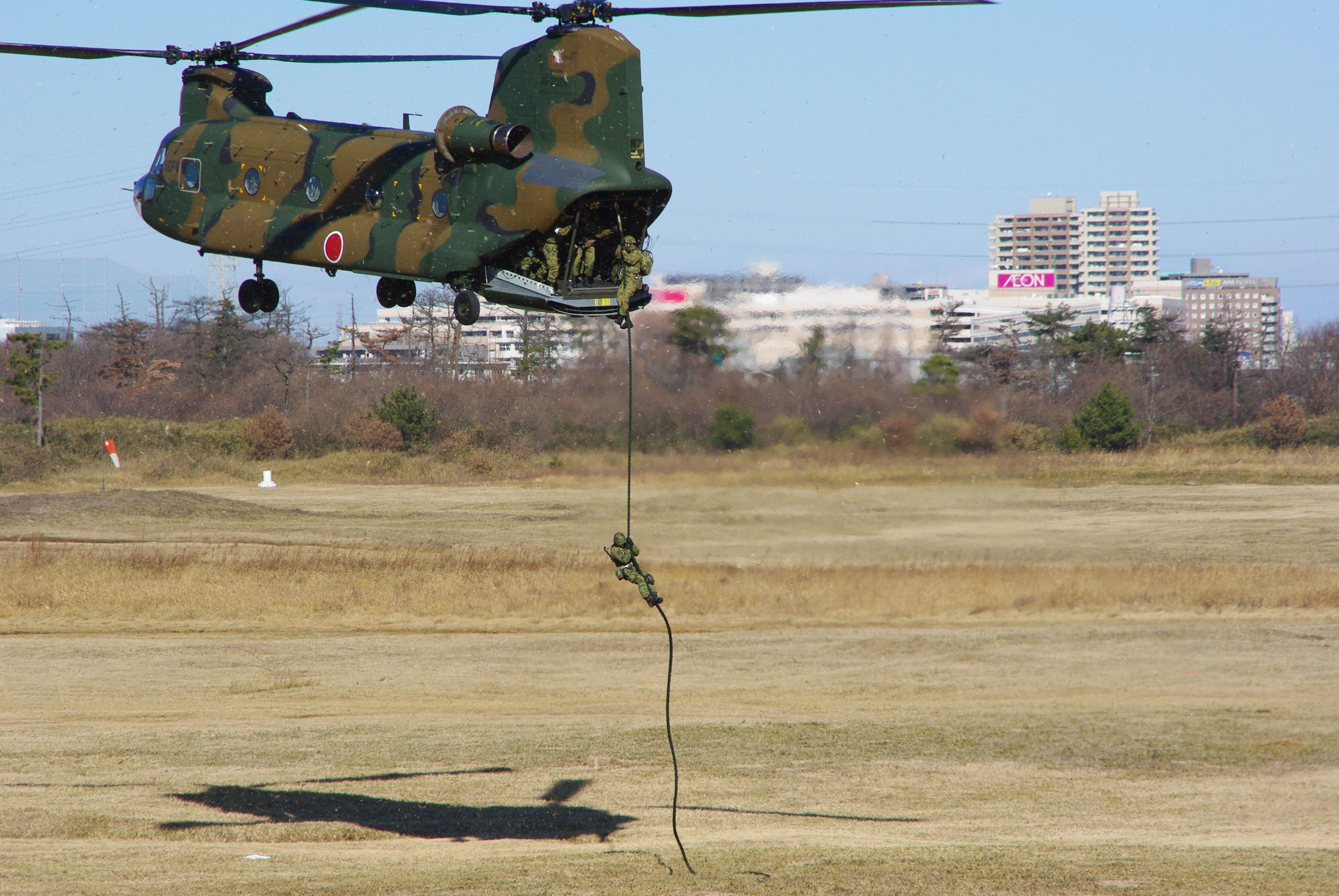
1st Airborne Brigade paratroopers fast rope from a Kawasaki CH-47 chopper during a public exhibition at Camp Narashino.

- 1st Airborne Brigade paratroopers have only been seen in action through annual new year JSDF exhibition shows in Narashino.

On January 8, 2023, the 1st Airborne Brigade conducted its first parachute drop training of the year joined by paratrooper units from the US, British and Australian armies in the Narashino training area in Chiba Prefecture. A total of 300 personnel participated in the drill involving a scenario where they recaptured an island occupied by enemy forces. Members of the brigade parachuted down to the ground as part of the drill.

=== Overseas ===
- 170 paratroopers were sent to Samawah, Iraq as part of the JGSDF's commitment to the international effort. Training was conducted for a short time in a joint exercise with American soldiers of the Oregon Army National Guard's 2nd Battalion, 162nd Infantry Regiment. All of them were withdrawn following the end of the Japanese commitment in Iraq.

== Notable personnel ==
- Akihiko Saito
- Keisuke Itagaki
- Yasunobu Hideshima
- Nakamura Morioka
