= Japan National Route 469 =

Road in Japan

National Route 469
- 国道469号
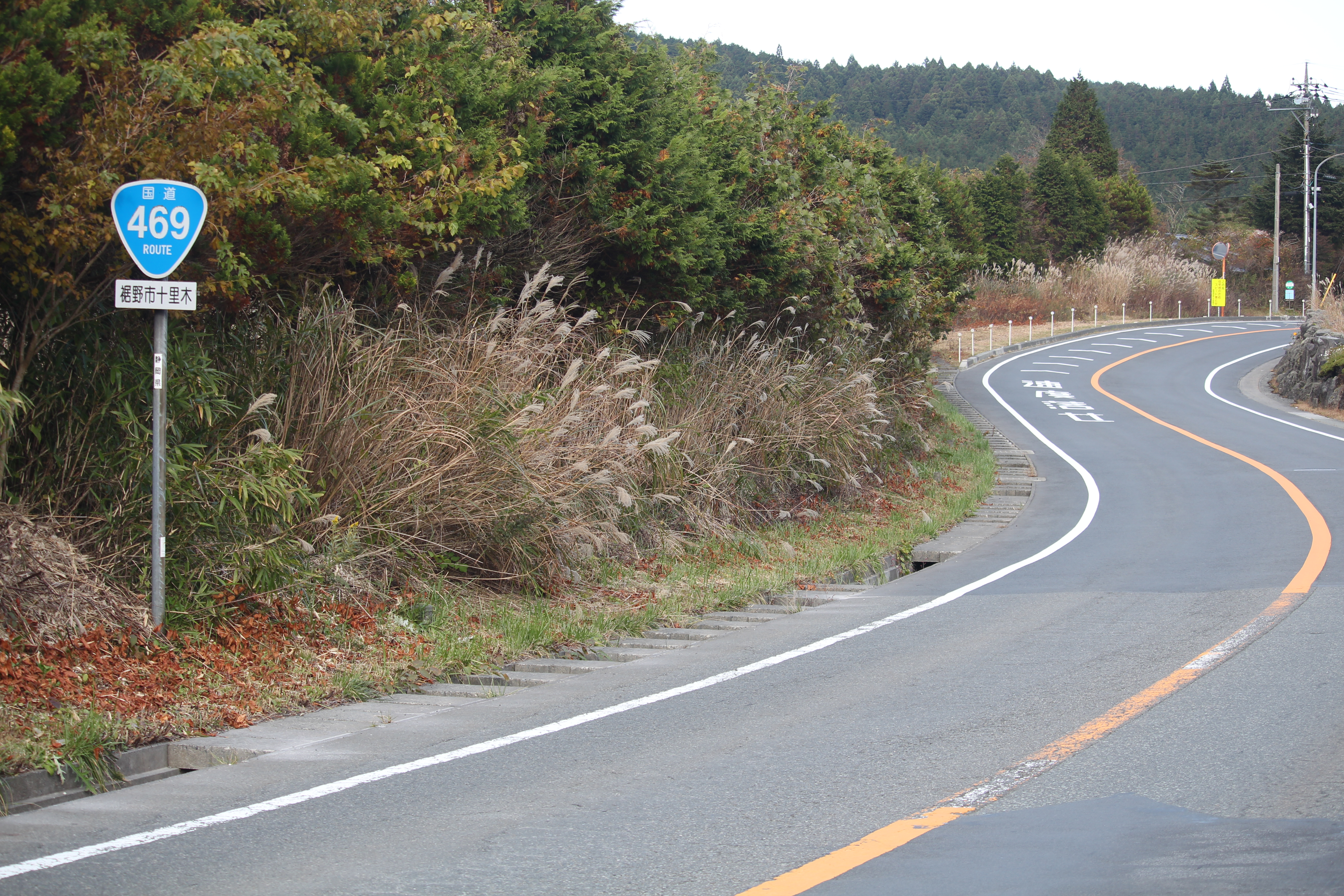

Route information
- Length: 59.1 km (36.7 mi)
- Existed: 1 April 1993–present

Major junctions
- From: Shizuoka Prefectural Route 418 in Gotemba
- To: National Route 52 in Nanbu

Location
- Country: Japan

Highway system
- National highways of Japan; Expressways of Japan
← National Route 468	→ National Route 470

National Route 469 is a national highway of Japan connecting Gotemba, Shizuoka and Nanbu, Yamanashi in Japan, with a total length of 59.1 km (36.7 mi).
