= Gotemba, Shizuoka =

Gotemba 御殿場市
- City
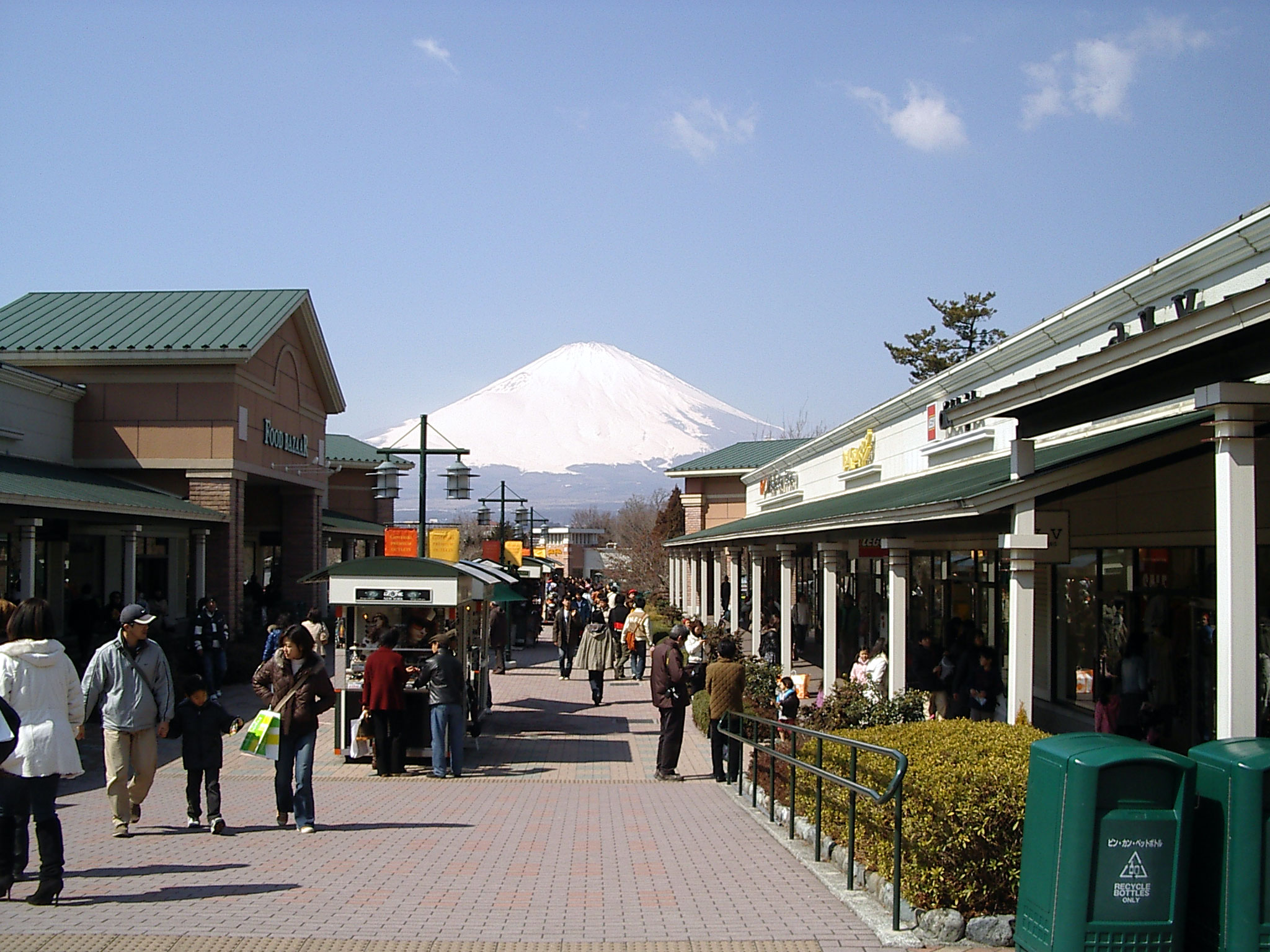
- Mount Fuji as seen from the Gotemba Premium Outlets on the outskirts of the city

- Flag Emblem

- Location of Gotemba in Shizuoka Prefecture

- Coordinates: 35°18′31.3″N 138°56′4.6″E
- Country: Japan
- Region: Chūbu (Tōkai)
- Prefecture: Shizuoka

Government
  - Mayor: Masami Katsumata (from October 2021)

Area
  - Total: 194.90 km^{2} (75.25 sq mi)

Population (June 30, 2019)
  - Total: 88,370
  - Density: 453.4/km^{2} (1,174/sq mi)
- Time zone: UTC+9 (Japan Standard Time)
- Phone number: 0550-83-1212
- Address: 483 Hagiwara, Gotemba-shi, Shizuoka-ken 412-8601
- Climate: Cfa
- Website: Official website
- Symbols
- Bird: Japanese thrush
- Flower: Sakura
- Tree: Japanese zelkova

Gotemba (御殿場市, Gotenba-shi; sometimes Gotenba) is a city on the southeastern flank of Mount Fuji in Shizuoka Prefecture, Japan. As of 30 June 2019, the city had an estimated population of 88,370 in 36,096 households, and a population density of 450 persons per km^{2}. The total area of the city is 194.90 square kilometres (75.25 sq mi).

== Geography ==
Gotemba is located in far eastern Shizuoka Prefecture at an altitude of 250–600 metres (820–1,970 ft). Mount Fuji is located to the west, and Mount Hakone to the east, with the Tanzawa Mountains to the north and Mount Ashitaka to the south. The area is noted for its numerous golf courses, with the Mitsui Sumitomo Visa Taiheiyo Masters taking place annually.

=== Surrounding municipalities ===
- Kanagawa Prefecture
  - Hakone
- Shizuoka Prefecture
  - Fuji
  - Fujinomiya
  - Oyama
  - Susono

=== Demographics ===
Per Japanese census data, the population of Gotemba has grown over the past 50 years.

Historical population
Year	Pop.	±%
1960	45,709	—
1970	55,997	+22.5%
1980	69,261	+23.7%
1990	79,557	+14.9%
2000	82,533	+3.7%
2010	89,028	+7.9%

=== Climate ===
The city has a climate characterized by hot and humid summers, and relatively mild winters (Köppen climate classification Cfa). The average annual temperature in Gotemba is 13.2 °C (55.8 °F). The average annual rainfall is 2,874.6 mm (113.17 in) with September as the wettest month. The temperatures are highest on average in August, at around 24.1 °C (75.4 °F), and lowest in January, at around 2.7 °C (36.9 °F).

Climate data for Gotemba (1991−2020 normals, extremes 1976−present)
Month	Jan	Feb	Mar	Apr	May	Jun	Jul	Aug	Sep	Oct	Nov	Dec	Year
Record high °C (°F)	16.2 (61.2)	20.3 (68.5)	22.2 (72.0)	27.0 (80.6)	30.3 (86.5)	32.7 (90.9)	33.8 (92.8)	35.3 (95.5)	33.0 (91.4)	29.2 (84.6)	24.3 (75.7)	20.2 (68.4)	35.3 (95.5)
Mean daily maximum °C (°F)	7.8 (46.0)	8.6 (47.5)	11.7 (53.1)	16.5 (61.7)	20.8 (69.4)	23.5 (74.3)	27.1 (80.8)	28.7 (83.7)	25.5 (77.9)	20.3 (68.5)	15.4 (59.7)	10.4 (50.7)	18.0 (64.4)
Daily mean °C (°F)	2.7 (36.9)	3.5 (38.3)	6.6 (43.9)	11.5 (52.7)	15.9 (60.6)	19.2 (66.6)	22.9 (73.2)	24.1 (75.4)	20.9 (69.6)	15.6 (60.1)	10.3 (50.5)	5.2 (41.4)	13.2 (55.8)
Mean daily minimum °C (°F)	−1.9 (28.6)	−1.2 (29.8)	1.9 (35.4)	6.8 (44.2)	11.7 (53.1)	16.0 (60.8)	20.1 (68.2)	21.0 (69.8)	17.5 (63.5)	11.6 (52.9)	5.7 (42.3)	0.5 (32.9)	9.1 (48.5)
Record low °C (°F)	−8.8 (16.2)	−12.2 (10.0)	−8.8 (16.2)	−4.8 (23.4)	2.4 (36.3)	8.0 (46.4)	11.3 (52.3)	12.9 (55.2)	7.0 (44.6)	0.9 (33.6)	−4.8 (23.4)	−7.7 (18.1)	−12.2 (10.0)
Average precipitation mm (inches)	104.6 (4.12)	128.9 (5.07)	253.3 (9.97)	248.4 (9.78)	255.7 (10.07)	297.4 (11.71)	361.4 (14.23)	247.5 (9.74)	372.5 (14.67)	315.2 (12.41)	185.5 (7.30)	104.3 (4.11)	2,874.6 (113.17)
Average precipitation days (≥ 1.0 mm)	6.8	7.8	12.1	11.5	12.3	14.1	13.9	11.2	12.5	11.6	8.8	6.8	129.4
Mean monthly sunshine hours	173.7	155.4	151.6	163.2	155.4	103.6	118.6	157.7	115.7	129.7	147.1	165.7	1,733.9
Source: Japan Meteorological Agency

== History ==
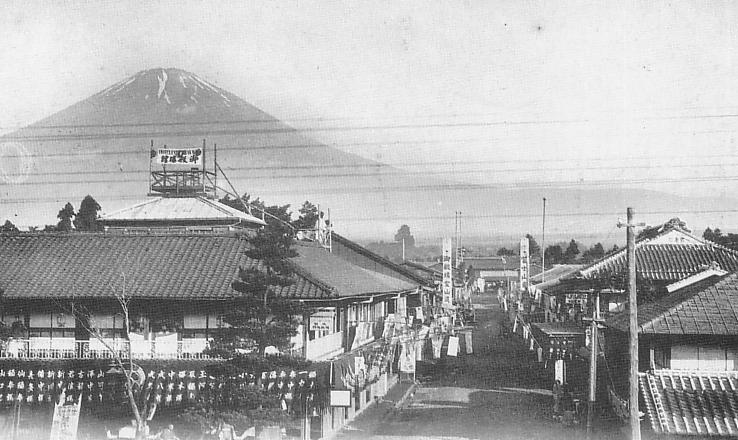
Gotemba in the early 1940s

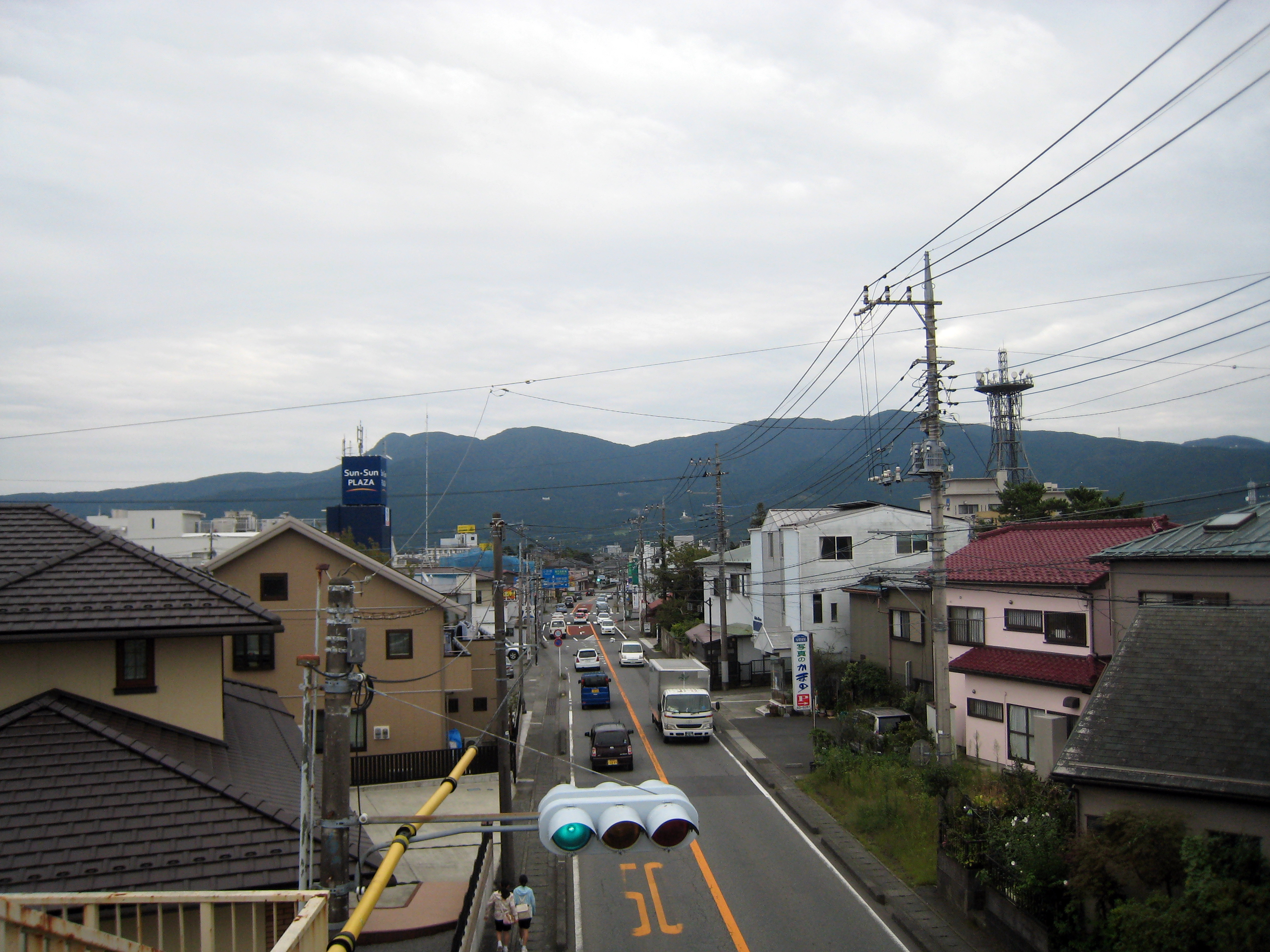
A street in Gotemba

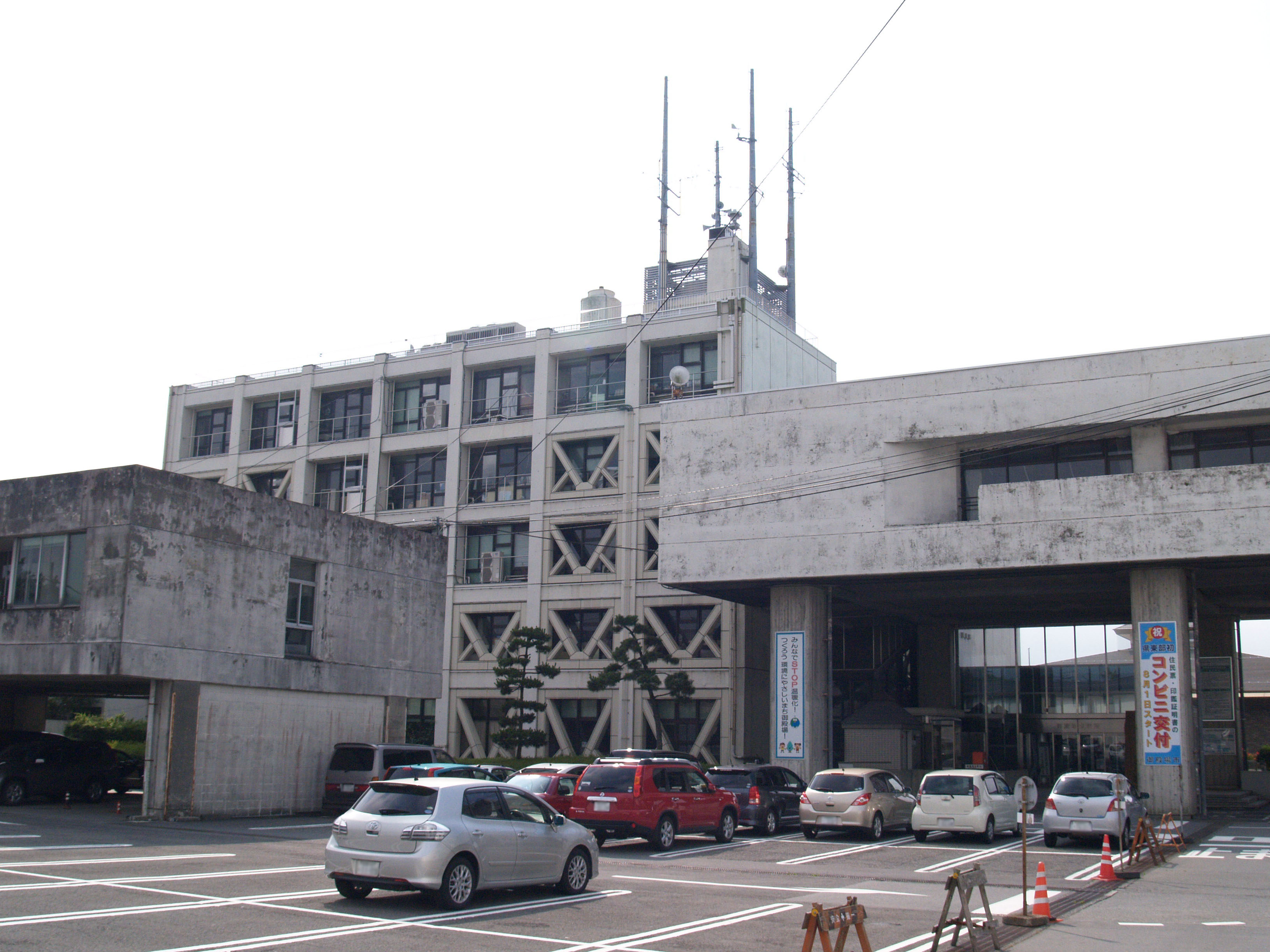
Gotemba City Hall

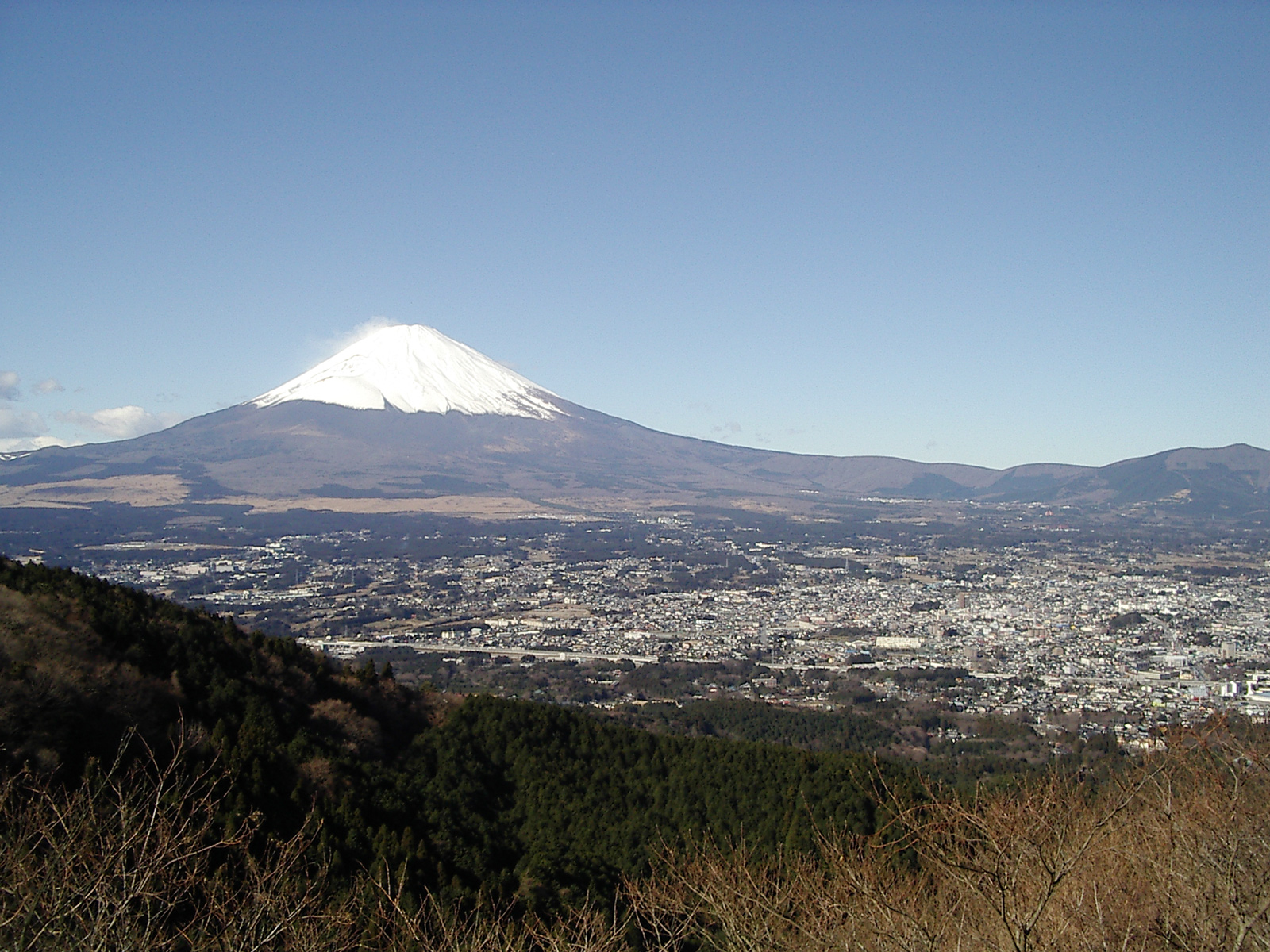
Mount Fuji and city of Gotemba

Gotemba was the location of the earliest known settlement founded in the region of Shizuoka which dates back 2,000 years ago. The inhabitants of the area (including Gotemba) were not ethnically Yamato and were likely Ainu.

Gotemba was the site of a shōen belonging to Ise Shrine in the Heian period. During the Edo period the area was part of Odawara Domain. After the start of the Meiji period, it became part of Shizuoka Domain until the abolition of the han system in 1871 and the establishment of Shizuoka Prefecture. The opening of Gotemba Station on what was then the Tōkaidō Main Line on February 1, 1889, spurred development of the area. With the establishment of the modern municipalities system on April 1, 1889, Gotemba Town was created within Suntō District, along with Fujioka Village, Harasato Village, Ino Village, Tamaho Village, and Takane Village.

However, the opening of the Tanna Tunnel on December 1, 1934, resulted in the route of Tōkaidō Main Line shifting south to Atami, leaving Gotemba on the spur Gotemba Line, which resulted in temporary depopulation. During the pre-war era, Gotemba was a major base area for the Imperial Japanese Army, and still houses military facilities and a large training area (the East Fuji Maneuver Area) for the modern Japanese Ground Self-Defense Force and the United States Marine Corps.

Gotemba was elevated to city status on February 11, 1955, through the merger of Gotemba Town with neighboring Fujioka Village, Harasato Village, Ino Village, and Tamaho Village. The city expanded through annexation of Takane Village on January 1, 1956 and the Furusawa District of Oyama Town on September 1, 1957. The Gotemba Interchange on the Tōmei Expressway was completed on May 25, 1969.

== Government ==
Gotemba has a mayor-council form of government with a directly elected mayor and a unicameral city legislature of 21 members.

== Economy ==
Gotemba has a mixed economy. Agriculture has traditionally been dominated by rice, irrigated by water from Mount Fuji, and has been supplemented by the growing of various green vegetables and the raising of pigs. Development of light industries, especially in food processing and electronics has profited through Gotemba's location on the Tōmei Expressway, and Gotemba is noted for a number of golf courses and a spacious outlet shopping center.

Retailing company Chelsea Japan rented former Gotemba Family Land Amusement Park, and officially opened in July 2000 as Gotemba Premium Outlets.

== Education ==
Gotemba has ten public elementary schools and six public junior high schools operated by the city government, and two public high schools operated by the Shizuoka Prefectural Board of Education. The city also has one private high school, and the prefecture also operates one special education school for the disabled.

== Transportation ==
=== Railway ===
- Central Japan Railway Company - Gotemba Line
  - Gotemba – Minami-Gotemba - Fujioka

=== Highway ===
- Tōmei Expressway
- National Route 138
- National Route 246
- National Route 469

== Sister cities ==
- Chambersburg, Pennsylvania, United States, since August 22, 1960
- Beaverton, Oregon, United States, since October 22, 1987

== Military installations ==
- East Fuji Maneuver Area
- JGSDF Camp Itazuma
- JGSDF Camp Komakado
- JGSDF Camp Takigahara

== Local attractions ==
The Peace Pagoda built in 1964 by Nipponzan-Myōhōji-Daisanga is a noted symbol of the city.

== Notable people ==
- Kenyu Horiuchi, voice actor
- Nobuo Serizawa, professional golfer
