= Special Forces Group (Japan) =

Military special operations unit of Japan

- 特殊作戦群
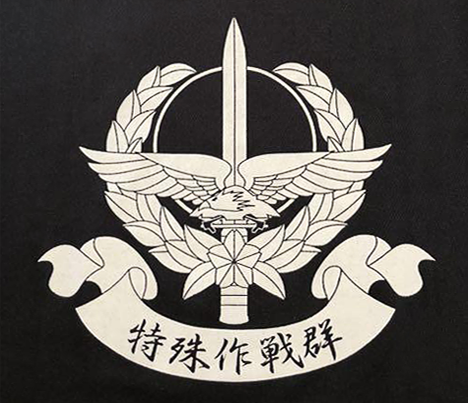
- Active: March 27, 2004–present
- Country: Japan
- Branch: Japan Ground Self-Defense Force
- Type: Special forces
- Size: Classified, estimated 300
- Part of: Ground Component Command
- Garrison/HQ: Narashino Garrison, Funabashi, Chiba
- Nicknames: SOG (Former); SFGp (Current)
- Engagements: War on terror; Iraq War; Iraqi occupation; War in Afghanistan (2001–2021); 2021 Kabul airlift; War in Sudan (2023–present); Evacuation of foreign nationals during the war in Sudan (2023)

Commanders
- Current commander: Takanori Hirata (Colonel)
- Notable commanders: Takashi Araya

The Special Forces Group (Japanese: 特殊作戦群, Hepburn: Tokushu-sakusengun) is the Japan Ground Self-Defense Force's special forces unit, established on March 27, 2004.

Their mission is infiltration into enemy territory, reconnaissance, sabotage, and hostage rescue, and conducting military operations against guerrillas or enemy commandos. The unit is based in Camp Narashino in Funabashi, Chiba, along with the 1st Airborne Brigade.

The SFGp has been referred to as Japan's Delta Force, due to their specialized role in the Japan Ground Self-Defense Force. The initial operators trained with the U.S. Army's Delta Force.

The civilian counterpart of the SFGp is the Special Assault Teams of the prefectural police departments under the Japanese National Police Agency.

While current manpower is classified, an estimated 300 operators are known to serve in the SFGp.

== History ==
In 1998, the Defense Agency had proposed the formation of a unit within the JGSDF that would handle tasks such as counter-terrorism with a selected group of JGSDF soldiers from the 1st Airborne Brigade sent to the United States to be trained by Green Berets operators. At the same time, two platoons were created from the brigade to be the foundations for the new unit. These consisted of the G Platoon (Formation Unit) and the S Platoon (Research Unit).

The establishment of the unit's framework had been completed in 2003, after 3 years of training and organisation. The unit's structure is based on that of Green Berets, Delta Force, SAS (Special Air Service), KSK (Kommando Spezialkräfte), and Australian Special Forces units. Bilingual 1st Special Forces Group personnel were on hand to assist the JGSDF in creating their Table of Organization and Equipment (TO&E). Takashi Araya once mentioned in an interview that he trained with Green Berets abroad for a year.

On March 27, 2004, the Defense Agency activated the unit as the Special Operations Group, mandated under the JGSDF for counter-terrorism operations.

In 2005, the SOG had deployed four of its operators to serve as bodyguards for the commander of the JGSDF's contingent in Iraq under the Japanese Iraq Reconstruction and Support Group.

On March 28, 2007, the SOG, along with the 1st Airborne Brigade, the 1st Helicopter Brigade, and the 101st NBC Protection Unit, became part of the newly created Central Readiness Force.

On March 26, 2008, the unit's name was changed from "Special Operations Group" (SOG) to "Special Forces Group" (SFGp).

On page 14 of the January–March 2014 edition of「Special Warfare」, authorized official bimonthly publication by the John F. Kennedy Special Warfare Center and School and Fort Bragg, the U.S. Army Green Berets 1st SOG(A) and the JGSDF SOG conduct a bilateral exercise "Silent Eagle," each fall at JBLM in Washington State.

In 2016, the SFGp was placed on standby during the 42nd G7 summit in case their assistance is required to back up the Special Assault Team and the Anti-Firearms Squad.

On page 83 of the October–December 2017 edition of Special Warfare magazine, an authorized official bimonthly publication by the John F. Kennedy Special Warfare Center and School and Fort Bragg, the strongest relationship and history between the U.S. Army Green Beret 1st SOG(A) 1st Battalion stationed in Okinawa, and the SFGp, as well as the training conducted by the former USPACOM subordinated Green Berets CRF (Crisis Response Force) and the JGSDF SFGp at Joint Combined Exchange Training (JCET) in Camp Narashino and Okinawa on various missions, including direct action, hostage rescue, urban operations, and mobility on rotary wing and vehicle platforms.

On January 18, 2018, the SFGp conducted one of their few exercises before the presence of the Australian and Japanese prime ministers. At least one SFGp operator was an observer at the Special Operations Forces Industry Conference (SOFIC) 2018 exercises in Florida. King Abdullah II of Jordan visited Japan and was given a demonstration by SFGp operators on November 27, 2018.

On February 18, 2019, several SFGp operators were deployed to attend Flintlock military exercises in Africa.

On November 5, 2021, the SFGp has trained in Guam with the Green Berets. Exercises between the 1st Special Operations Group and the SFGp are conducted yearly under the codename Silent Eagle.

On June 29, 2021, then Prime Minister Yoshihide Suga visited maneuvers performed by SFGp operators.

On August 23, 2021, more than a dozen SFGp operators, along with 100 regular JGSDF troops, were deployed to evacuate Japanese nationals and other civilians from Afghanistan.

In August 2022, photos from Joint Exercise Dusk Samurai 2022 with the Australian Army 2nd Commando Regiment at Sydney Parramatta, Australia, were posted on the Australian Department of Defence (Australia) official website.

On October 6, 2022, the JGSDF confirmed on their official website, Facebook, Instagram, and Twitter accounts that the SFGp and the Australian Army Special Operations Command (Australia) conducted field training in Australia in August 2022.This is the first official announcement by the JGSDF regarding the SFGp's training and joint training between SFGp and special forces units of other countries, and was the sixth joint exercise with the Australian Army Special Forces since 2015.

Volume 19, number 1, 2023 of Veritas, a publication published by the U.S. Army Special Operations Command History Office, contains a description of SFGp and details of Joint Exercise Silent Eagle 2011 between SFGp and the U.S. Army Green Berets 1st SOG(A).

On March 16, 2023, the JGSDF confirmed on their official website, Facebook, Instagram, and Twitter accounts that the SFGp and the U.S. Army Special Operations Command (Green Berets) conducted field training in United States in January to February 2023.

On March 17, 2023, the U.S. Army 1st Special Forces Group (A) confirmed on their official Facebook and Instagram accounts that the SFGp and 1st SOG(A) conducted joint training with the United States Special Operations Command (USSOCOM) in February 2023.

On April 25, 2023, SFGp operators were deployed to Sudan alongside CRR soldiers to help Japanese and foreign nationals leave the country due to fighting between the Rapid Support Forces (RSF) and the Sudanese Armed Forces.

== Formation ==
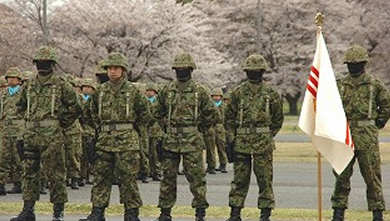
JGSDF SFGp commandos standing at parade rest during a 2007 ceremony.

According to a 2017 Gendai Ismedia article, the SFGp is reported to compose of the following:

- Commander (Led by a Colonel)
- Executive Officers (Led by a Lieutenant Colonel)
- Headquarters
  - 1st Department (General Affairs)
  - 2nd Department (Intelligence)
  - 3rd Department (Planning)
  - 4th Department (Supply)
- Headquarters Administration Unit (Led by 3 Majors)
- 1st SOG Company
  - Company Headquarters
  - 1st Platoon (HALO)
    - Specialized squads (e.g. Assault, Sniper)
  - 2nd Platoon (Naval warfare)
  - 3rd Platoon (Mountain warfare)
  - 4th Platoon (Urban warfare)
- 2nd SOG Company
- 3rd SOG Company
- Training Unit

== Training ==
Potential recruits to the SFGp are drawn from Ranger-qualified JGSDF soldiers and paratroopers of the 1st Airborne Brigade. The unit's passing rate is said to be at 3% due to demanding physical fitness qualifications aside from a recruit's ranger or airborne qualifications.

SFGp operators are required to study English in order to be bilingual, although they are trained to learn other languages like Arabic, Chinese and Russian.

When the first soldiers were recruited, there was an effort for them to have foreign training due to a lack of experience. According to Takashi Araya, he had to train with the Green Berets in order to be familiarized with modern special forces concepts since those who are Ranger-trained and those who are in the SFGp are not different in terms of their training. Others were given training by various private military contractors when they have free time in either the US or in the UK with their own money.

The SFGp does joint exercises with the SAT.

== Weapons ==
Like the special operations units of other countries, not only those listed here, but also all kinds of domestic and foreign small arms and equipment that are neither distributed nor disclosed to the general public are selected from catalogs and test samples for government agencies that are not open to the public, and are rumored to be procured in secret and in abundance through the ample budget or secret funds of the Japanese government. It is said that the unit is also characterized as a special operations and weapons/equipment development experimental unit, and there is a possibility that the results of equipment development experiments are fed back to the general units as well. (e.g. the new Howa Type 20).

=== Personal Clothing and Equipment ===
Due to the nature of their missions, the Special Forces Group uses a variety of combat clothing and equipment. Depending on the mission, they wear Type 3 camouflage uniforms, urban camouflage, and MultiCam uniforms, etc. Privately-purchased items and equipment from the U.S. military and other foreign militaries are also observed in use.

- Type 3 camouflage uniform
- Type 3 camouflage uniform for urban areas

In addition to the camouflage uniforms deployed by regular units, unique equipment such as dark blue camouflage uniforms are also provided. According to Article 4, Paragraph 1 and Appendix 1 of the Detailed Regulations for Ground Self-Defense Force Personnel Dress (JGSDF Directive No. 24-8, February 28, 1968), combat uniforms are classified into general, aviation, airborne, armored, and urban wear, and urban combat uniforms may be worn "by SDF personnel in special operations groups (including those scheduled for deployment) when they are engaged in deployment, training, etc." In 2022, images released by the Australian Department of Defense and the Ministry of Defense's official social networking sites show Special Operations Group members wearing urban camouflage uniforms. (This image has since been removed from their official social media accounts)

- MultiCam uniforms

Worn according to the mission/operation. During the Japan-U.S. Joint Military Exercise Keen Sword 23, personnel can be seen wearing multicam camouflage uniforms.

- Various MultiCam equipment

In addition to the camouflage uniforms, the ADF has a variety of MultiCam equipment, and images released by the Australian Department of Defence show SFGp members wearing MultiCam kits.

- Combat Shirts

In an image released by the Australian Department of Defence, SFGp personnel are wearing combat shirts similar in design to the Type 3 camouflage uniform.

- Type 18 bulletproof vest
- Type 3 bulletproof vest (modified)
- FAST helmet
- Type 88 helmet (Type 2)

It was confirmed at the Central Readiness Force Formation Completion Ceremony that the 1st Airborne Corps was equipped with a three-point chinstrap specification similar to the one used by the 1st Airborne Corps.

- Balaclava
- Personal night vision device JGVS-V8 (monocular night vision device)
- GPNVG-18 (four-lens night vision device)

Purchased through FMS (Foreign Military sales). Images released by the Australian Department of Defence confirm that Special Operations Group personnel are equipped with these night vision devices.

- Personal Protective Equipment
- Airtight protective clothing
- Ballistic goggles

Tactical gloves made of various flame-retardant and abrasion-resistant materials

=== Assault rifles ===
Special Forces groups tend to be more diverse in their use of foreign rifles than the Japanese-made Howa Type 89 and Howa Type 20 rifles used by conventional units.

- Colt M4A1 SOPMOD Block I:

A statement by Tomoaki Iishiba, a U.S. Army captain indicted for exporting military-grade optical sights and other equipment to Japan without authorization from the U.S. government, revealed that the Japan Ground Self-Defense Force has purchased and adopted the M4 carbine [61]. It was also confirmed that the M4 carbine was purchased with FMS (Foreign Military Sales) in 2007 and 2008[60][62] along with the QDSS-NT4 suppressor and M203A2 grenade launcher.

- Heckler & Koch HK416

It was procured as Special Rifle B and was confirmed to have been equipped by personnel aboard the UH-60 Black Hawk, as seen in images from a training exercise in Australia in 2022. At that time, they were observed using optical sights (mostly EOTech and Aimpoint sights), laser aiming modules, tactical flashlights, Magpul PMAGs and Heckler & Koch Gen.3 magazines, etc.

- FN SCAR
- Heckler & Koch G36
- HOWA Type 20

The Howa Type 20, which is the latest service rifle of the JSDF featuring an adjustable stock, improved water, dust, and corrosion resistance, and built-in accessory rails for greater customizability, is preferably deployed by the SFGp.

- HOWA Type 89-F

The Howa Type 89-F (also known as the Type 89 Para), which is a variant of the standard-issue Howa Type 89 featuring a folding stock that enables versatility in close-quarters combat and urban warfare, is deployed. The Type 89-F is used by airborne troops, armored vehicle crews, and reconnaissance soldiers in addition to the Special Forces Group.

=== Battle Rifles ===
- Heckler & Koch HK417

Public Notice for Central Procurement" under the title of "Technical Assistance" in the information on the public call for applications of the Supply Control Headquarters.

- FN SCAR

=== Sub-machine guns ===
- Heckler & Koch MP5
- Heckler & Koch MP7
- SIG MPX
- Minebea PM-9

=== Machine guns ===
It is used to support troops, and depending on the mission, it can be mounted on a tripod, bipod, vehicle such as a Komatsu light armored vehicle, helicopter such as CH-47JA and UH-60JA, or aircraft and fired.

- FN MINIMI

A Type 62 tripod can be mounted, and a night vision device for close range aiming, or "direct aiming glasses" may be mounted for long range shooting.

- M2 Browning

In addition to being used with a tripod mounted, it is installed on a special mount for position defense and use as an anti-aircraft weapon. Also mounted on vehicles, helicopters and aircraft.

- M134 Minigun

It is mounted on the UH-60JA and CH-47JA helicopters.

=== Sniper rifles ===
- Remington M24
- Barrett M99
- Barrett M88
- SAKO TRG

Used with the M24A2 in joint training with the U.S. Army Special Operations Command during the "FY2022 FOIP (Free and Open Indo-Pacific Intervention Program)" held from January to February 2023.

- Remington MSR

=== Shotguns ===
- Remington Model 870 (Wilson Combat-based)

=== Pistols ===
- Heckler & Koch USP

Reportedly the Tactical model as they are used with suppressors and laser aiming modules.

- Minebea P9

Carried by members in a leg holster (Safariland 6004) when appearing before the press at the Central Readiness Force formation completion ceremony on March 31, 2007.

- SIG Sauer P226
- Heckler & Koch SFP9
- Large caliber pistol (model unknown)
- Subcompact pistol for concealed carry (model unknown)

=== Weapon attachments ===
Privately-purchased weapon attachments and those obtained through FMS (Foreign Military Sales) can be seen, but the most commonly used examples are:

- M203 grenade launcher
- QDSS-NT4 suppressor
- EOTech holographic weapon sights
- Aimpoint CompM2
- Aimpoint CompM4
- Aimpoint Micro T-1/T-2
- EOTech magnifiers
- AN/PEQ-15

=== Missiles and rocket launchers ===
- Type 91 surface-to-air missile
- Type 01 LMAT
- Carl Gustaf 8.4 cm recoilless rifle
- Panzerfaust 3

=== Grenades and landmines ===
- HOWA Type 96 automatic grenade launcher
- Various grenades
- Smoke grenades
- Stun grenades

Procurement of Type 1 flash-pitched sounding canisters and multi-stage flash-pitched sounding canisters has been confirmed.

- Type 92 anti-tank mines

=== Other Equipment ===
In addition to conventional combat, the Special Operations Group conducts special warfare such as counterterrorism operations and mountain warfare, and is therefore equipped with a number of special personal effects tailored to its missions.

- Type 53 21.5mm Flare Gun
- Special Security baton

The procurement of baton holsters has been confirmed. The Central Readiness Regiment, the Maritime Self-Defense Force Entry Inspection Unit, and the Police Force are also equipped with special baton holsters.

- Handcuffs
- Chemical light
- Individual First Aid Kit

IFAK (Individual First Aid Kid), etc. In general, due to the nature of their missions, special forces units are equipped with more advanced and sophisticated first aid equipment than the general forces.

- Multi-tool, survival knife
- Lensatic compass
- Tactical light (flashlight)
- Binoculars, etc.
- Various sensors, drones, and other reconnaissance and information gathering equipment
- Various field communications equipment (satellite communications equipment, etc.)
- GPS navigation equipment (Garmin, etc.)
- Portable explosive detection equipment 2
- Chemical agent detectors
- CR detectors
- Unit dosimeters
- Type 3 Dosimeter
- Type 3 Company Dose Rate Meter
- Portable Dosimeter Set
- Portable Weather Meter
- Rebreather (CCR)

=== Vehicles ===
- High Mobility Vehicle
- All combat units of the JGSDF possess these vehicles.
- Komatsu light armored vehicle [68]
- Type 73 heavy-duty truck
- Type 73 medium truck

A published photo of the unit's building reveals that they possess a Type 73 Medium Truck and a Type 73 Heavy Truck.

- Reconnaissance motorcycles

The reconnaissance motorcycle is capable of airborne drop and airborne transport using a high-altitude air-drop system (CADS). U.S. Special Forces are also equipped with these vehicles.

- Bulletproof raid support vehicle

Special Forces of various countries have this vehicle. Japanese police special forces also have them.

- Light snow vehicle (snowmobile)
- Type 10 snowmobile
- Combat Rubber Raiding Craft(CRRC)

The Amphibious Task Force, 1st Airborne Brigade, and Special Operations Group possess these vehicles. The Maritime Self-Defense Force has adopted 11-meter class RHIBs under the name of Special Boat (SB), which are equipped by the Special Security Forces. General units are equipped with rubber boats for reconnaissance.

- Various SUVs

Bulletproof and equipped with an armory. Mimicking civilian vehicles.

- Personal vehicles of members of the unit

Individual troopers' vehicles may also be modified to be equipped with robust weapons magazines to prevent seizure, and may be loaded with weapons and equipment for action.

== Unit features ==
As part of regulating and protecting the identities of the various soldiers serving in the unit, their faces are hidden in balaclavas and cannot be revealed except with authorization from their commanding officers. SFGp officers are exempted from the rule.
