= Central Readiness Regiment =

Japanese infantry regiment

- Active: March 26, 2008 – present
- Country: Japan
- Branch: Japan Ground Self-Defense Force
- Type: Mechanized infantry
- Role: Rapid deployment
- Size: approx. 700 soldiers
- Part of: Ground Component Command (陸上総隊)
- Garrison/HQ: Utsunomiya, Tochigi Prefecture
- Nickname: Chū-Soku-Ren (中即連)
- Motto: Who Else but Us (俺がやらねば誰がやる)
- Engagements: ・South Sudan PKO Mission ・2021 Afghanistan RJNO Operation ・Operation Ocean Shield

Commanders
- Current commander: Colonel Hitoshi Goto (since 2025)

The Central Readiness Regiment (中央即応連隊, Chūō-Sokuō-Rentai) is an infantry regiment of the Japan Ground Self-Defense Force, being stationed at Camp Utsunomiya near the Utsunomiya Air Field (Camp Kita-Utsunomiya), as it is intended to be ready for rapid deployment both in Japan and abroad.

== History ==
The regiment was established in August 2006. The first regimental commander, Colonel Yamamoto, was appointed in 2007 with the formation of the regiment was complete by March 2008.

In 2009, a detachment selected from the regiment was sent to Djibouti to participate in an anti-piracy operation as a security force at the air base. Since then, the regiment has been deployed on a number of missions outside of Japan, including a humanitarian assistance mission for the 2010 Haiti earthquake and the United Nations Mission in South Sudan.

During Fall of Kabul and Kabul airlift in Afghan War, the regiment were dispatched to evacuate its citizens in Afghanistan

In 2025, it was reported that the regiment is planned to be merged in 2026 with the Special Forces Group to form a new Special Forces Brigade.

== Organization and Equipment ==
The regiment was established as a unique infantry regiment of the Central Readiness Force. Unlike the 1st Airborne Brigade being a unique airborne force, the regiment has adopted a table of organization and equipment similar to that of an infantry regiment with three rifle companies. However, it has developed specialized organization of its own for special missions, including a military engineering company being established in 2017 and an explosive ordnance disposal team in 2019. All of the soldiers in this regiment have volunteered to be transferred, and many are qualified as paratrooper or ranger.

The regiment is equipped with armoured fighting vehicles similar to other infantry regiments, including Komatsu LAV and Type 96 armored personnel carrier. In addition, the regiment also is equipped with unique equipment to prepare for military operations other than war overseas, such as Bushmaster Protected Mobility Vehicles for non-combatant evacuation operations and Long-range acoustic devices as non-lethal weapons.

In August 25, 2019, an IHI Aerospace-made unmanned ground vehicle was deployed at the 2019 Fuji Firepower demonstration for explosive ordnance disposal missions.

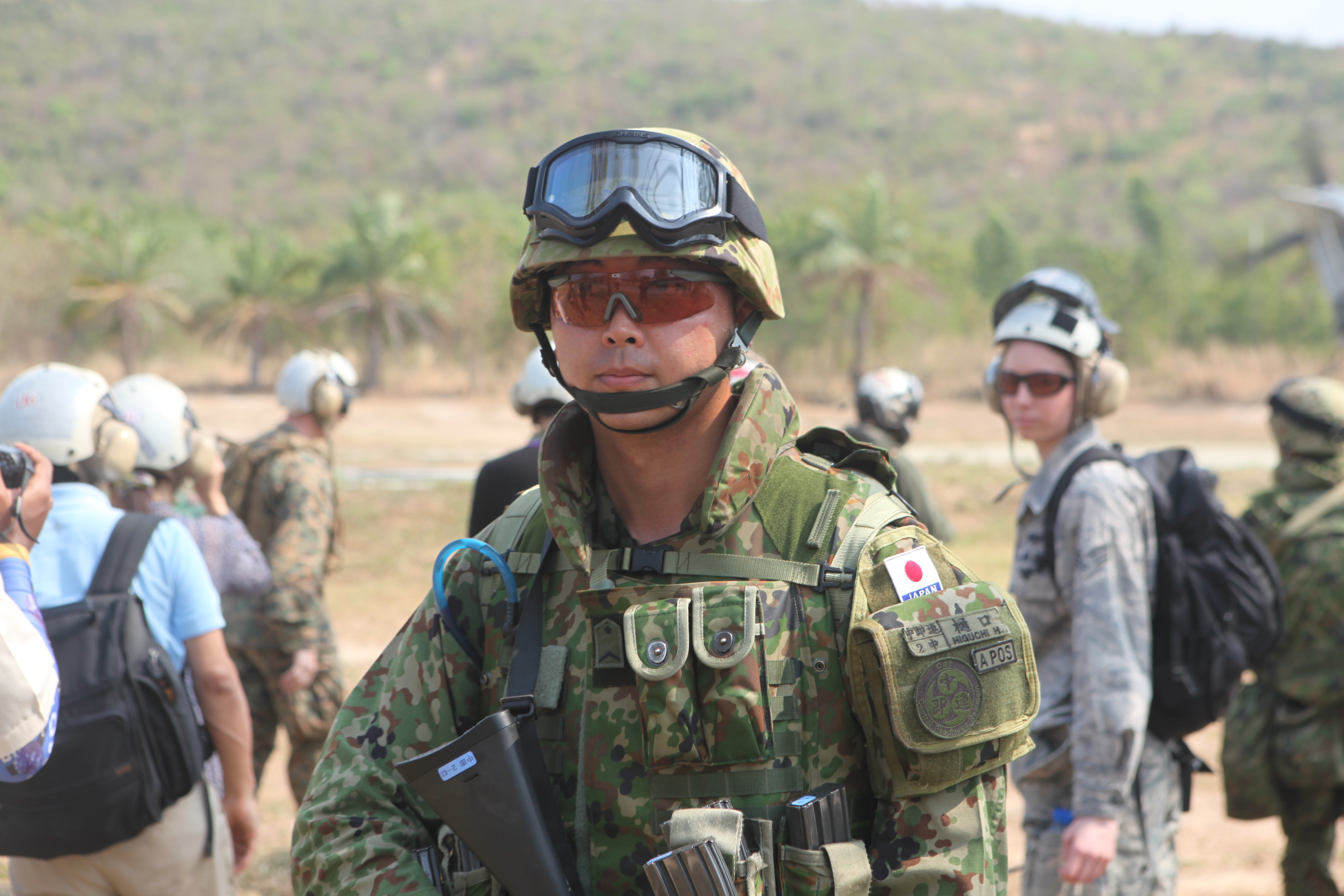
A CRR soldier during the multi-national Cobra Gold exercise

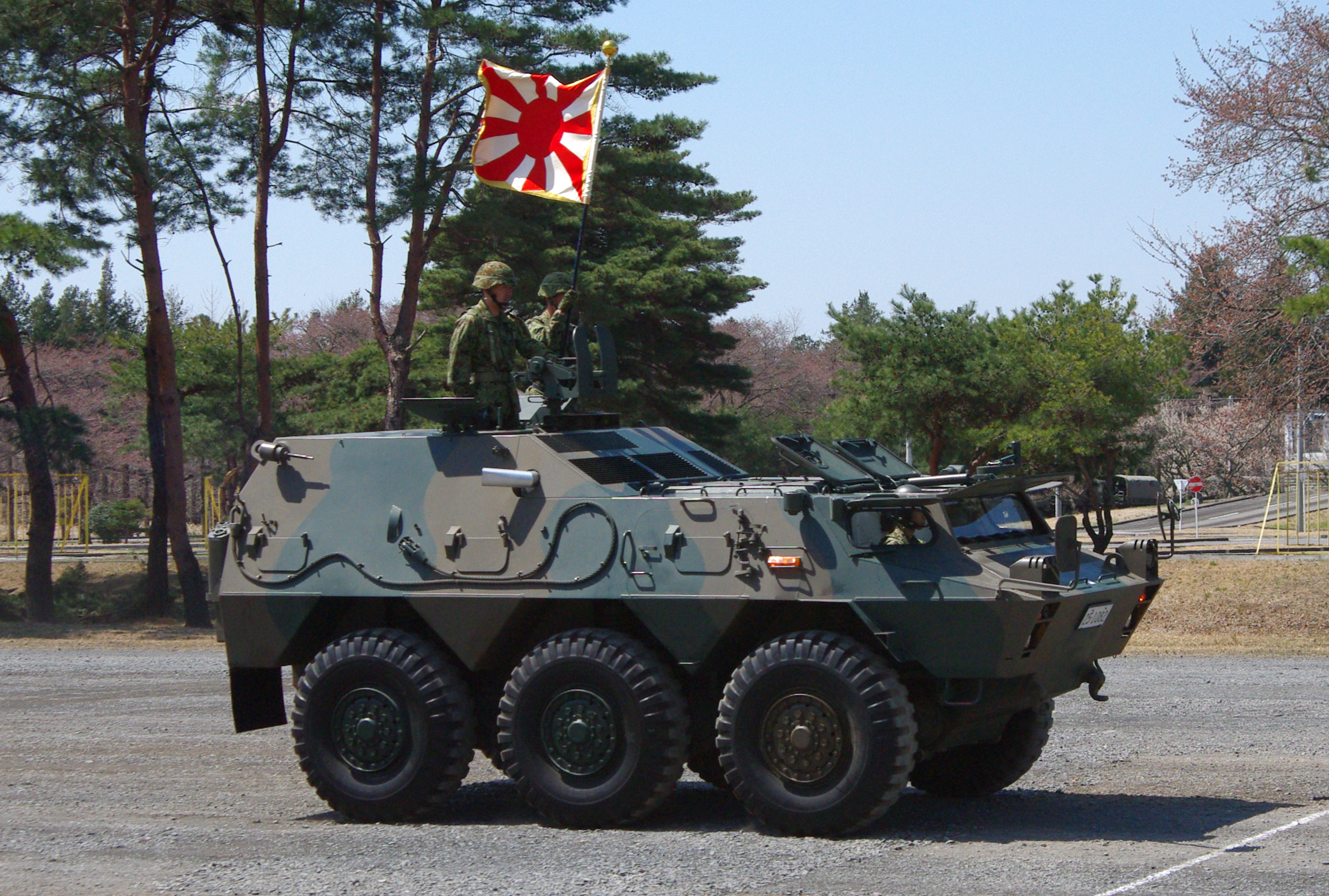
Type 82 Command Communication Vehicle with a Rising Sun Flag

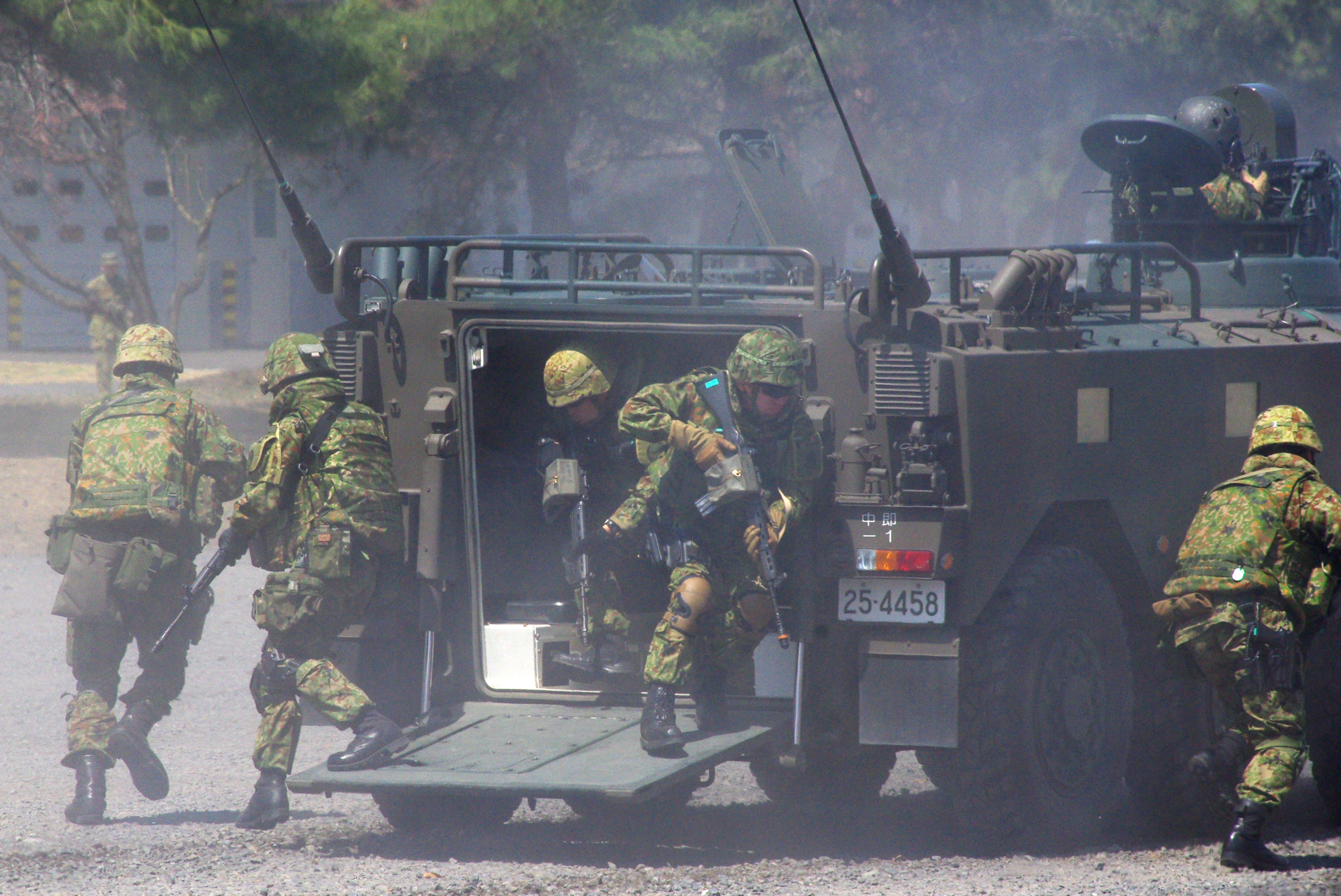
CRR soldiers rushing from a Type 96 APC
