= Takashi Araya =

Japanese martial artist and author (born 1959)

- 荒谷 卓 (Araya takashi)
- Born: January 1, 1959; Akita Prefecture, Japan
- Education: Ōdate Homei High School; Tokyo University of Science
- Military career
- Allegiance: Japan
- Branch: Japan Ground Self-Defense Force
- Service years: 1982-2008
- Rank: Colonel
- Units: Special Forces Group, Ground Self-Defense Force
- Other work: Martial artist (Director of Meiji Jingu Budojo Shiseikan), Reserve Blue Ribbon Advisor

Takashi Araya (荒谷 卓, Romanization: Araya Takashi, 1 January 1959 (Shōwa 34) - ) is a Japanese martial artist and author, who is the director at Shiseikan, Meiji Shrine. He was a Japan Ground Self-Defense Force colonel and has organized the Special Forces Group (特殊作戦群, Tokushusakusengun) as the first leader.

== Biography ==
Takashi Araya attended Ōdate Homei High School in Akita Prefecture and graduated from Tokyo University of Science. The Araya family served the Northern Fujiwara noble family through a gold mining business. When he was a student at the Tokyo University of Science, he majored in remote sensing of artificial satellites. While attending the University of Science, he practiced karate mainly at the Kyokushin Nagareyama Dojo, and also practiced at the Meiji Jingu Martial Arts Dojo, Meiji Shrine. In the summer of the 4th year of Science University, his teacher advised him to join the Japan Self-Defense Forces and said, "You look like a soldier. Join the Self-Defense Forces." After graduating, he joined the Ground Self-Defense Force as an officer candidate.

After graduating from the officer candidate school, he worked as a unit in the infantry regiment and qualified for airborne, ranger officer, and intelligence officer. He worked in the 19th Ordinary Regiment of the Western Army as a junior officer. After becoming a middle grade officer, he worked at the Ground Self-Defense Force Research School (currently the JGSDF Military Intelligence School), where he studied Information Gathering Satellites. Thereafter, he entered the JGSDF Staff College, Command and General Staff Course (CGS). After graduating from the same school, he worked as a company commander of the 1st Airborne Brigade and the JGSDF 39th Infantry Regiment. In 1995, Araya studied abroad at the German military school Bundeswehr Command and Staff College.

The following year, he returned to Japan in 1996 and worked for the Ground Staff Office Defense Department. In the Ground Staff Office, he worked in the Research Team, Defense Team, Operations Team, and also in the Strategic Laboratory, Defense Policy Division, Defense Bureau, and the Defense Agency. During this time, he was involved in reviewing defense strategies, formulating medium- to long-term defense capability development plans, defense legislation such as the Terrorism Special Measures Law, and North Korea issues. In addition, at the Ground Staff Office, where the special forces creation design was underway, he struggled to prepare for the establishment of the special forces,. He gained the personal reputation as "the expert of special operations of the Ground Self-Defense Force".

In 2002, in order to establish the first special forces of the Japan Ground Self-Defense Force, he studied abroad for one year in the United States Army Special Forces (Green Beret) and received education on special missions. After returning to Japan, Araya became the commander of the Special Operations Group formation preparation team, and prepared the special forces training curriculum. Simultaneously, he secured personnel from among the JSDF who volunteered all across the country. When selecting personnel, they set strict selection criteria similar to those of the British and American Special Forces and conducted a selection test. However, there were some divisions that did not pass. The division commander protested and they directly faced this problem.

In 2004, a special operations group was established and Araya became the first group leader. Araya led the special operations group for three years under the guidance policy of "special operations group warrior Bushido". During his tenure, he continued his service at Yasukuni Shrine, which he had occasionally performed since he was a junior officer. In various missions, there were often disagreements with the Ground Staff on the development and command relations of the special operations group, but there was no compromise on the strength of the unit. Shigeru Ishiba, then Director general of the Defense Agency, favorably evaluated Araya's work as the first group leader in his book "National Defense."

In 2007 (Heisei 19), he retired from the Special Operations Group. Afterward, he worked as the Chief Research and Development Officer of the GRD (JGSDF Ground Research and Development Command). Director of 3rd Laboratory, 2nd Research Division, General Research Department, etc. In August 2008 he retired with the rank of Colonel.

After retiring, he became the director of the Meiji Jingu Shiseikan in October 2009, and worked to enhance the youth nature school and martial arts courses to learn Japanese spiritual culture. He also focused on holding martial arts courses outside Japan, and helped establish the European-based International Shiseikan Martial Arts Association, the Russian Shiseikan Martial Arts Club, and the Moscow State University Martial Arts Club. He resigned in October 2018.

In November 2018, the "International Symbiotic Creation Association, Kumano Asuka Musubi No Sato" was established in Asuka-cho, Kumano city, Mie Prefecture, and started activities in the UNESCO Sacred Sites and Pilgrimage Routes in the Kii Mountain Range. The activities are aimed at creating a better world by reawaking the resilience and power of the human psyche, through self-sustaining daily activities and experiences with friends. A goal is to forge a better future for people globally based on the greatness of nature and Japanese traditional culture. According to Araya, global capitalism will collapse and approach a period of total human transformation, and how to build the world beyond this period is an urgent issue for humankind. In order for humankind to maintain its history for as long as possible, it is necessary to abandon the principle of competition and base it on the order of harmony and symbiosis, and natural beliefs such as animism are clues. It is natural that different cultures and traditional customs are formed according to the different natural environment in each region of the world. Instead of forcibly unifying them with one idea or order, each cultural custom is mutually shared. He argues that a world that respects and acknowledges should be the world order of post-global capitalism. As a concrete activity for that purpose, in order to form regional cultural communities around the world that eliminate the influence of money as much as possible and to build a network that connects with each other, the "International Symbiotic Creation Association" was established with the base in Kumano. The reason for being based in Kumano is that the Nankii Peninsula is the oldest area of natural beliefs in Japan.

=== Controversy ===
Araya is accused of being a COVID-19 denier, accusing mass media of hyping concerns about the pandemic and the deep state. also, he made many claims about the Russo-Ukrainian War, especially to justify the Russia's Invasion of Ukraine - such as "a current situation about Ukraine is a conspiracy orchestrated by United States and UK to make Russian forces reluctantly joined the war, just like what they did to Japan (今般のウクライナ情勢は、かつて日本がはめられたのと同じやり方でロシアを戦争に引きずり込もうという英米の策略だ。)" He's also accused of far right-wing views of wanting to turn the JSDF into an actual military.

On January 23, 2021, Kyodo News revealed that Araya has offered various forms of unsanctioned private military combat training courses to active duty or reserve JSDF personnel for several years. The JSDF Intelligence Security Command kept him under surveillance for years because of his Ultranationalistic behavior and his unsanctioned private military combat training, but he was never charged.

== Bibliography ==
Takashi Araya wrote several books. These mainly cover topics such as special forces, bushido, JSDF, self-improvement, samurai spirit, security and constitutional amendment.

=== Single-work ===
- Takashi Araya "To the Fighters" Namiki Shobo, 2010. ISBN 4890632530 .
- Takashi Araya "To those who Fight: Japan's Cause and Bushido", 2015, ISBN 4890633324.
- Takashi Araya "Unwavering Power to Strengthen Yourself" Mikasa Shobo, 2018. ISBN 4837927475 .
- Takashi Araya "Resurrection the Samurai Spirit! Creating a world that lives together under the roof of the universe ”Namiki Shobo, 2019. ISBN 4890633839 .

=== Co-authored ===
- Kazuhiro Araki, Sukeyasu Ito, Takashi Araya, The Reservists' Blue Ribbon Association "Self-Defense Forces Illusion" Sankei Shimbun Publications, 2016. ISBN 9784819112925 .

=== Edited ===
- Meiji Jingu Seiseikan "Meiji Jingu Seiseikan Martial Arts" Namiki Shobo, 2013. ISBN 9784890633104 .

=== Interview ===
- Kazuhisa Ogawa "The Real Face of the Ground Self-Defense Force" Shogakukan, 2009. ISBN 4093897190 .

=== Contribution ===
- Public Interest Incorporated Association Taiyukai "" Defense "No. 51" Lessons from the Algerian Hostage Case "" Public Interest Incorporated Association Taiyukai, 2013.
