= Bushmaster Protected Mobility Vehicle =

Australian-built armoured vehicle

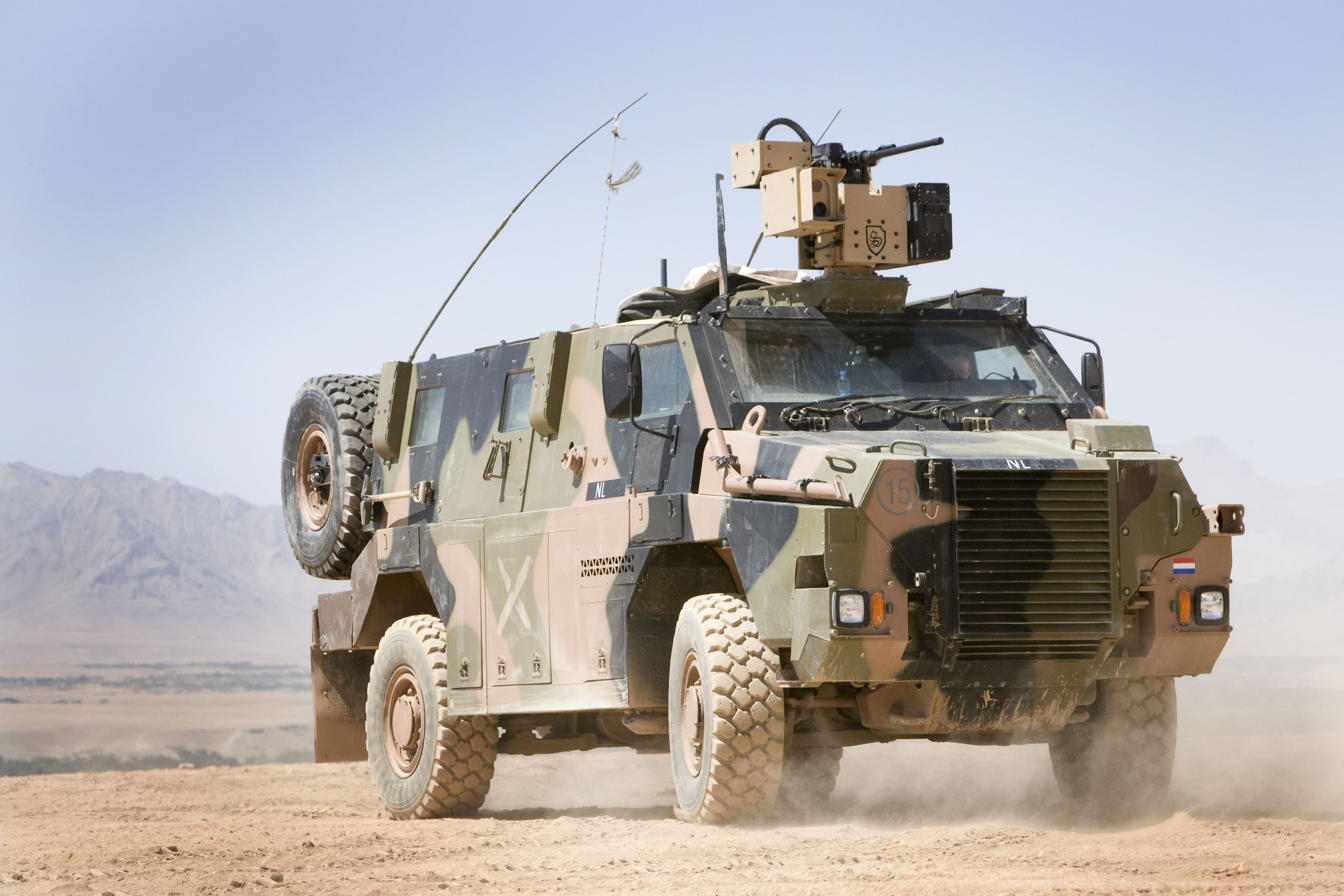
- A Royal Netherlands Army Bushmaster fitted with a remote turret
- Type: Infantry mobility vehicle
- Place of origin: Australia

Service history
- In service: 2004–present
- Used by: Users
- Wars: INTERFET (East Timor); War in Afghanistan; Iraq War; Northern Mali conflict; UNDOF (Golan Heights); Iraqi Civil War; Syrian Civil War; Russian invasion of Ukraine

Production history
- Designer: Thales Australia (formerly ADI)
- Manufacturer: Thales Australia (formerly ADI)
- Unit cost: A$2,450,000 (2022)
- Produced: 1997–present
- No. built: > 1,300 as of January 2025
- Variants: Troop, Command, Ambulance, IED, Utility

Specifications
- Mass: 11,400 kg (25,133 lb) (kerb); 15,400 kg (33,951 lb) (GVM)
- Length: 7,180 mm
- Width: 2,480 mm
- Height: 2,650 mm
- Crew: 1 (driver), 9 (passengers)
- Armor: ballistic exceeds STANAG 4569 level 1 – standard ballistic up to STANAG 4569 level 3 – option FSP up to STANAG 4569 level 5 – option IED high level of protection from monocoque hull – standard mine exceeds STANAG 4569 level 3 – standard
- Main armament: Remote weapon station up to 12.7 mm HMG or 40 mm AGL, or manned open turret up to 12.7 mm HMG or 40 mm AGL
- Secondary armament: Manned swing mounts up to 7.62 mm (one front and two rear)
- Engine: Caterpillar 3126E 7.2L six-cylinder diesel, turbocharged 224 kW (300 hp) @ 2,200rpm 1,166 N⋅m (860 lb⋅ft) @ 1,440rpm
- Power/weight: 26.4 hp/tonne
- Transmission: ZF Ecomat 6HP502 G2 (six forward speeds, one reverse)
- Suspension: Arvin Meritor 4000 series fully independent, progressive coil spring with upper control arm and lower wishbone
- Ground clearance: 1,340 mm (front overhang); 1,950 mm (rear overhang); 40° (approach angle); 38° (departure angle); 108° (ramp over angle); 60% (gradient); 36° (side slope); 460 mm (vertical obstacle); 1,200 mm (fording, unprepared)
- Fuel capacity: 319 L (84 U.S. gal)
- Operational range: 800 km (497 mi)
- Maximum speed: 100 km/h (62 mph)(governed)
- Steering system: Power assisted

The Bushmaster Protected Mobility Vehicle or Infantry Mobility Vehicle is an Australian-built four-wheel drive armoured vehicle. The Bushmaster was primarily designed by the then-government-owned Australian Defence Industries (ADI) and is currently produced by Thales Australia following its acquisition of ADI. The Bushmaster is currently in service with the Australian Army, Royal Australian Air Force, Royal Netherlands Army, British Army, Japan Ground Self Defense Force, Indonesian Army, Fiji Infantry Regiment, Jamaica Defence Force, New Zealand Army and the Armed Forces of Ukraine.

Transportation of infantry, incorporating full protection from small arms fire, was the primary role for which the Bushmaster was designed; infantry would dismount from the vehicle before going into action. As it was lightly armoured, the term infantry mobility vehicle (IMV) was initially used, rather than armoured personnel carrier, to distinguish the Bushmaster from heavier wheeled and tracked APCs used by the Australian Army, such as the ASLAV and M113. It was later discovered that the high-hardness steel specified for the Bushmaster meant that it generally offered better protection against ballistic weapons and IEDs than the aluminium alloys used in ASLAVs and M113s. To reflect this capability, it was later redesignated a "Protected Mobility Vehicle" (PMV).

== Development ==
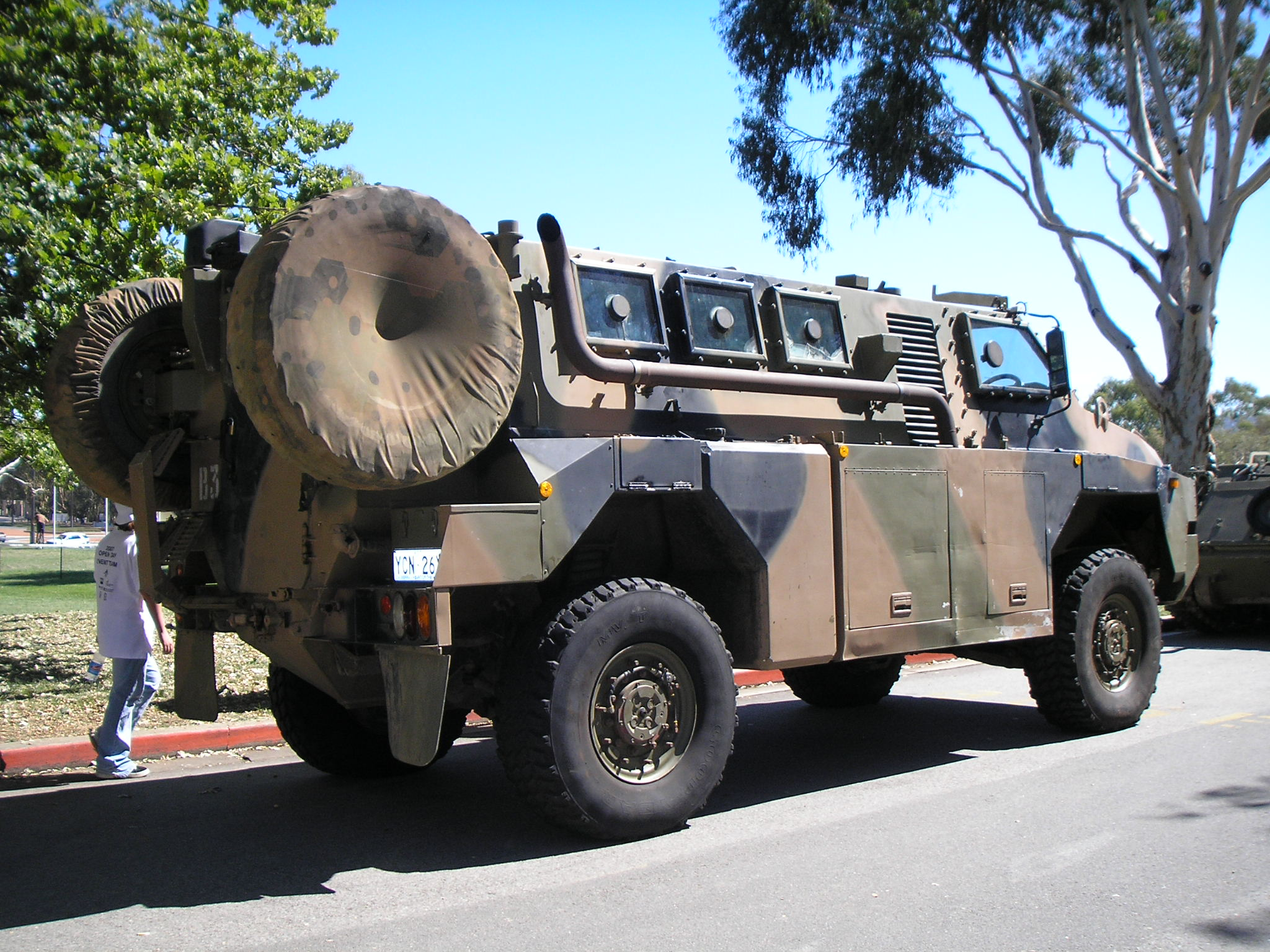
A pre-production Bushmaster

The 1991 Defence Force Structure Review identified the Australian Army's need for an Infantry Mobility Vehicle (IMV). The 1994 White Paper stated that new land force vehicles would be acquired. Project Bushranger (Land 116) was created to procure both protected and unprotected vehicles.

The Interim Infantry Mobility Vehicle (IIMV), a fleet of unarmoured vehicles similar to the Land Rover Perentie were built and purchased from British Aerospace Australia, from November 1993, to prove the concept of infantry mobility and fill the IMV role, until the IMV entered service.

In February 1994, the draft specification for the IMV was released, followed in July by the invitation to register interest, with 17 proposals received including by Australian company Perry Engineering with the Bushmaster, and by Australian Specialised Vehicle Systems with the Taipan, derived from the South African Mamba. In September 1995, the request for tender was issued to five shortlisted proposals.

In early 1996, Perry Engineering produced a prototype Bushmaster, based on an Irish designed Timoney Technologies MP44, including the Rockwell/Timoney independent suspension, and with US company Stewart & Stevenson components from the Family of Medium Tactical Vehicles (FMTV). Over 65% of the components by Stewart & Stevenson were from the FMTV including engine, transmission, steering, instrumentation, electrical and pneumatic systems. The prototype was built in less than seven months.

In September 1996, the Australian government-owned company Australian Defence Industries (ADI) purchased the intellectual property rights from Boral's Perry Engineering with agreement from Timoney Technologies and Stewart & Stevenson.

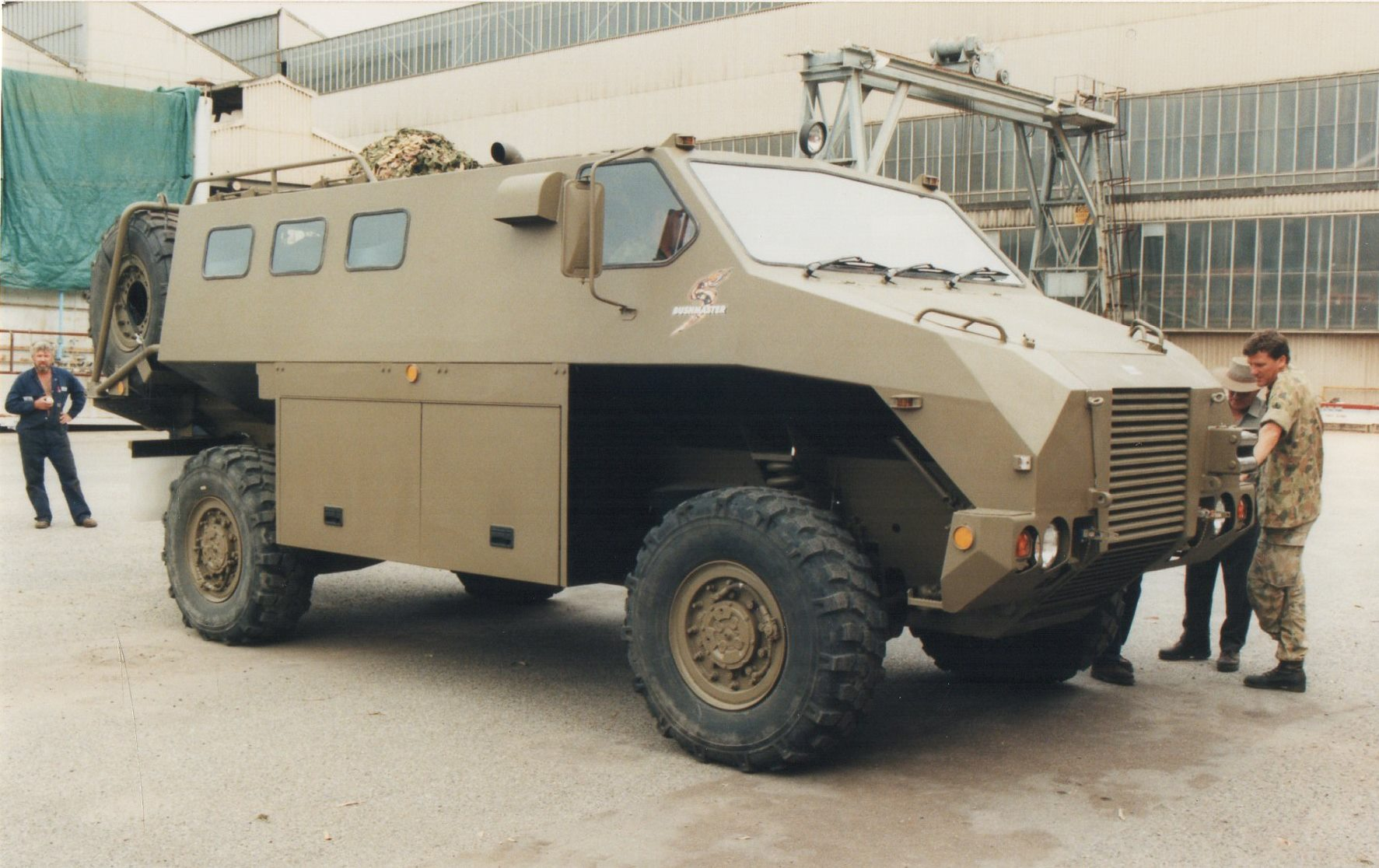
A Bushmaster prototype at Perry Engineering in Adelaide in the late 1990s

By January 1997, following the withdrawal of other bids, the Bushmaster and Taipan remained the only contenders for the project. That November, ADI launched its re-engineered Bushmaster proposal changing the design and shape of the hull to withstand a greater force and associated internal and external features. In March 1998, three Bushmaster IMVs and three Taipan IMVs built in South Africa started a 44-week competitive evaluation trial. Neither vehicle fully met all of the requirements of the specification, and performed with varying success over the course of the trials.

In March 1999, ADI was awarded the Bushranger contract to produce the Bushmaster at their Bendigo facility. In November 1999, ADI was privatised becoming 50% owned by French company Thales and 50% owned by Australian company Transfield. In 2006, Thales acquired the remaining 50% of ADI and renamed the company to Thales Australia.

In October 2016 it was announced that Australia and Indonesia would jointly develop a vehicle based on the Bushmaster for use by the Indonesian military. The vehicle, known as the Sanca, is manufactured by Pindad in collaboration with Thales.

== Design ==
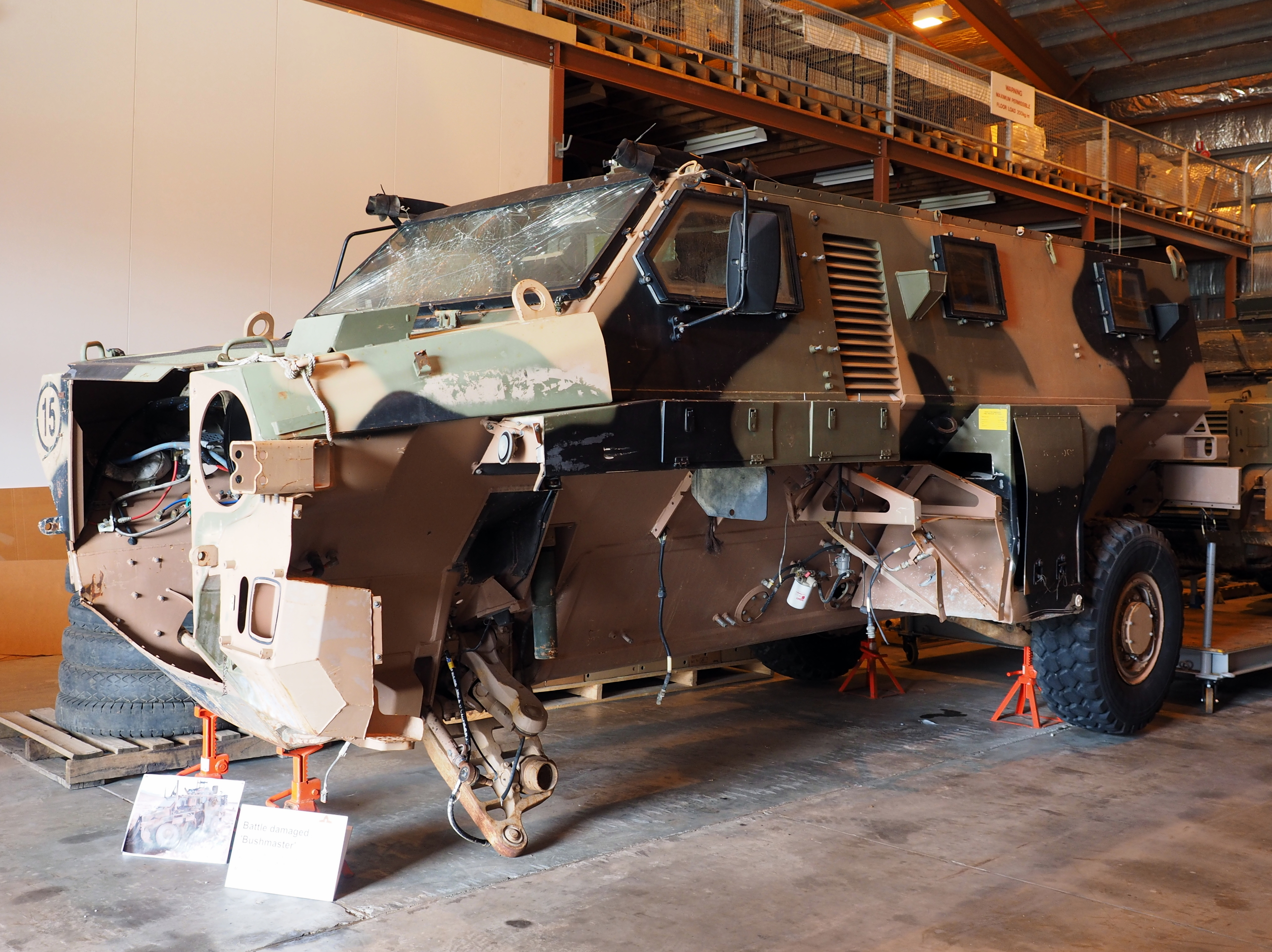
A Bushmaster that was badly damaged by a bomb in Afghanistan, with the front storage bins removed to show the type's V-shaped hull.

The Bushmaster is optimised for operations in northern Australia, and is capable of carrying up to nine soldiers and their equipment, fuel and supplies for three days, depending on the type of variant. The vehicle is fitted with air conditioning and was once planned to have a cool water drinking system, but was omitted upon production due to cost constraints. After operational complaints the drinking water cooling system is being reconsidered for installation. It has a road cruise speed of 100 km/h and an operational range of 800 km.

The Bushmaster is a mine protected vehicle and provides a high degree of protection against land mines, using its v-hull monocoque to deflect the blast away from the vehicle and its occupants. The vehicle's armour provides protection against small arms of up to 7.62 mm ball ammunition, 81 mm mortar fragments, Claymore mines, and with additional applique armour, protection for armour-piercing ammunition of up to 7.62 mm.

The fuel and hydraulic tanks of the vehicle are located outside the crew compartment, while it also has an automatic fire suppression system. The troop carrier variant of the Bushmaster is fitted with one gun ring. The forward gun ring can be fitted with a 5.56 mm or 7.62 mm machine gun. The two rear hatches each have a mounting boss to allow the attachment of a swing mount capable of holding a 7.62 mm machine gun.

The Bushmaster is air transportable by the C-130 Hercules and C-17 Globemaster III aircraft, as well as the Mil Mi-26 cargo helicopter. It is the first armoured vehicle to be completely manufactured in Australia since the Sentinel tank during World War II.

== History ==
In keeping with the vehicle's role and capabilities, the Australian Army designates Bushmaster-equipped infantry units as being motorised, and not mechanised. Following the vehicle's troubled development, a total of 299 Bushmasters were ordered by the Wheeled Manoeuvre Systems Program Office of the Defence Materiel Organisation for the Australian Defence Force, reduced from the 370 which were originally ordered.

Bushmaster deliveries began in 2005, three years later than was originally scheduled, and were scheduled to be completed in July 2007. Deliveries of the troop-carrier variant (152 vehicles) were completed on 7 June 2006. Deliveries of the command variant were completed by mid-2006 followed by the delivery of the other variants.

In December 2006 Minister for Defence Brendan Nelson announced that the Australian Bushmaster order had been increased and over 400 vehicles would be delivered. This figure was confirmed as 443 vehicles in a subsequent press release. In August 2007 an additional 250 were ordered for a total ADF delivery of 696 vehicles of all configurations. This was increased in October 2008 to 737 vehicles for the Australian Defence Force.

In May 2011 the Australian government announced the purchase of an additional 101 Bushmasters, in order to replace vehicles damaged on operations and to provide additional vehicles for training and operational use. A further order for 214 vehicles was announced in July 2012. This order was placed to retain skilled workers needed to later produce Hawkei vehicles, with the Army having little need for the additional Bushmasters. This took the total number of Bushmasters in service with the Australian military to 1,052.

The Motorised Combat Wing of the Army's Combat Arms Training Centre provides initial training to Army and Air Force Bushmaster drivers. Maintenance training is provided by the Army Logistic Training Centre.

As of 2017, the Bushmaster was planned to remain in service until 2030.

In May 2023, the Australian government placed a A$160 million order for 78 Bushmasters to replace the Bushmasters gifted by Australia to Ukraine, and to keep the Bushmaster production line open. In July 2024, the Australian government placed a A$45 million order for 15 Bushmasters to be delivered in 2026 to be used for the command and control of the new High Mobility Artillery Rocket System (HIMARS) that the Army is scheduled to receive from 2025. In January 2025, the Australian government placed a A$100 million order for 44 Bushmasters to be used for the command and control of a new land-based maritime missile system that the Army is to acquire. In April 2026, the Australian government announced that it had placed a A$750 million order for 268 "next generation" Bushmasters.

== Variants ==
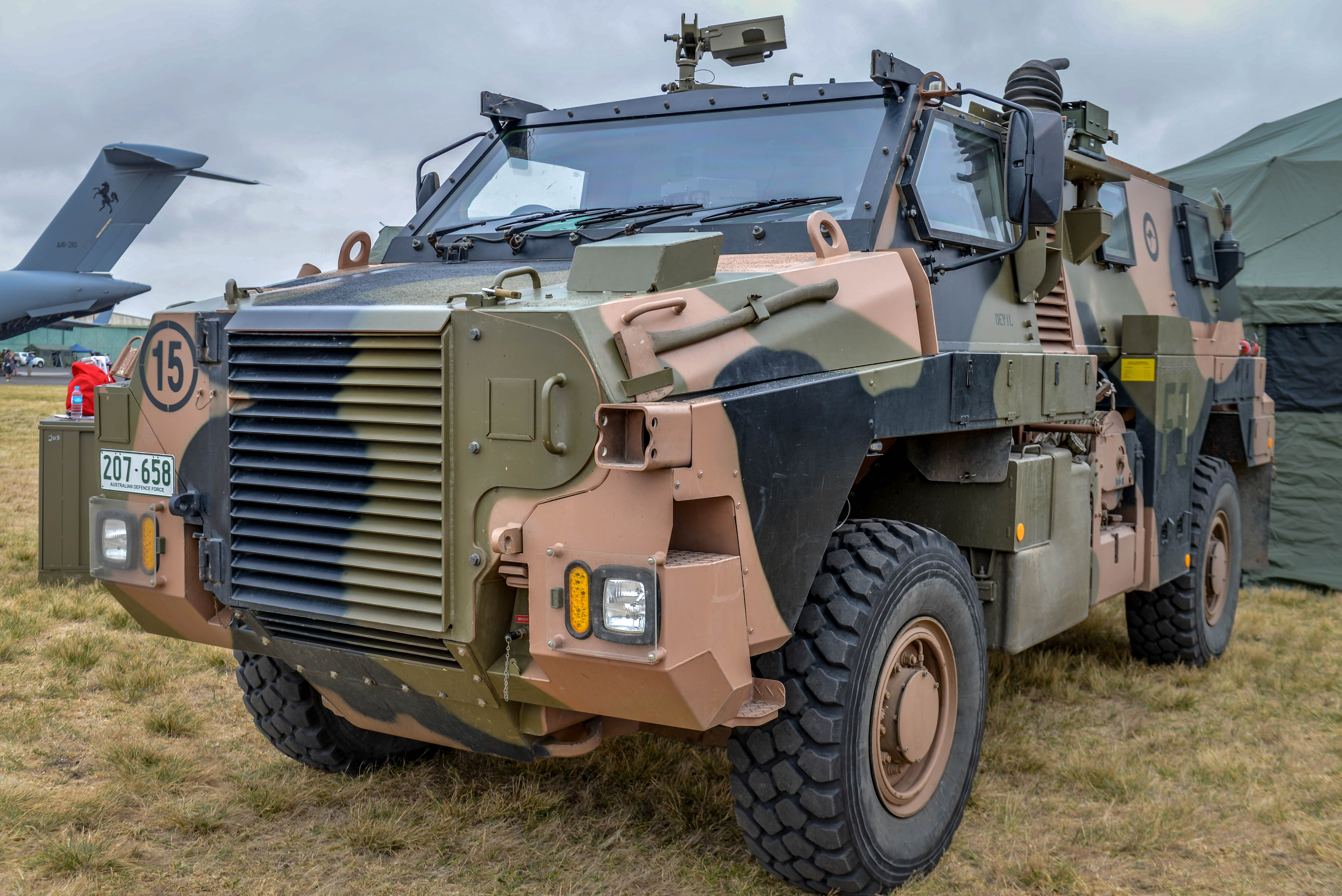
A Bushmaster operated by the Royal Australian Air Force's Airfield Defence Guards

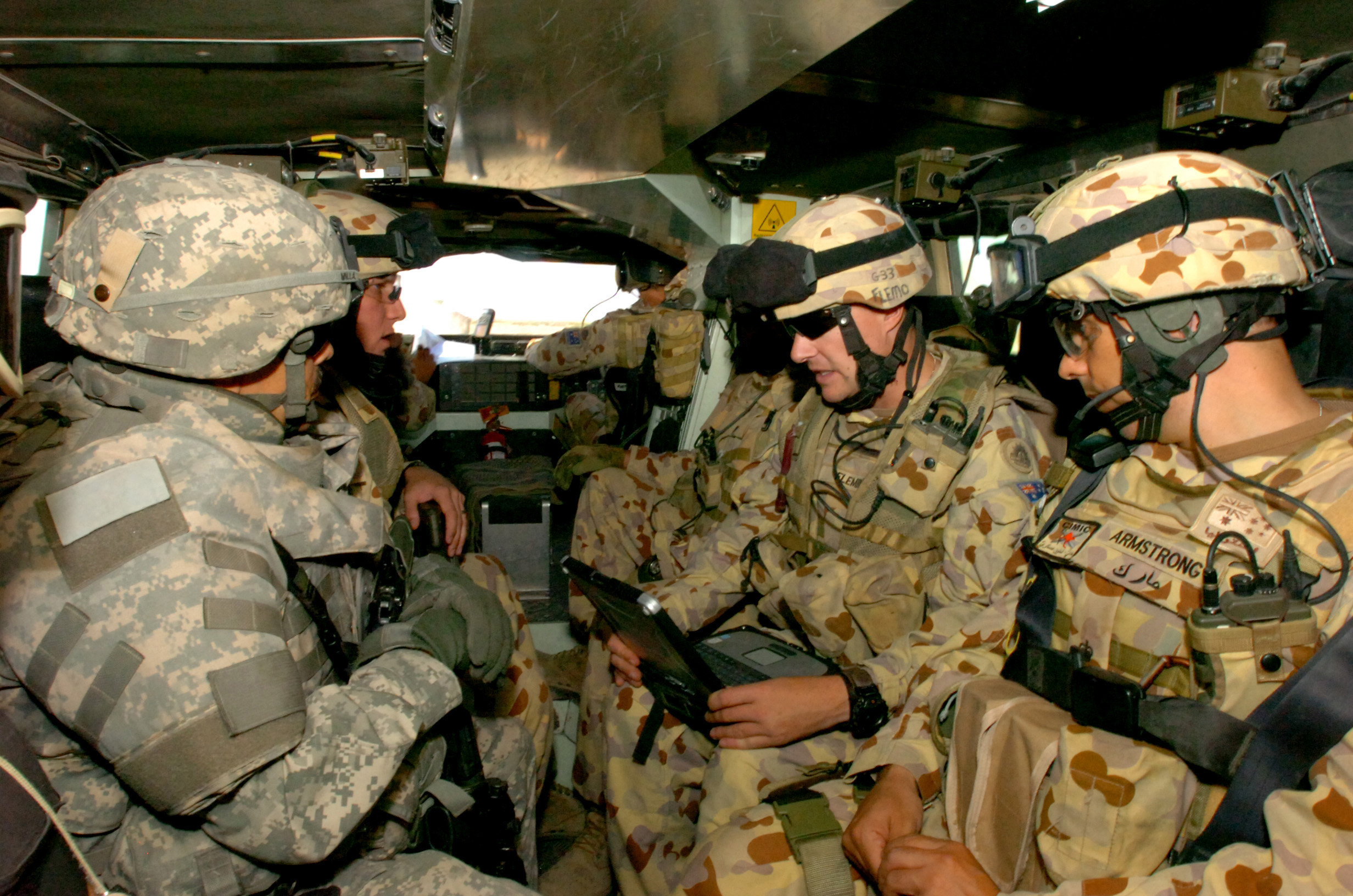
Australian and United States soldiers inside a Bushmaster

Several Bushmaster variants have been produced for the Australian Army and Royal Australian Air Force, these are:

- Troop
- Command
- Assault Pioneer
- Air Defence
- Mortar variant
- Direct Fire Weapons
- General Maintenance Variant (reworked Pioneer)
- Ambulance

The Troop variant being used by the Royal Australian Air Force originally differed from the Army variant in that it was fitted with 10 seats for infantry and a third weapon mount. All Troop variants are now fitted with 10 seats.

Thales developed a Single Cab Utility variant of the Bushmaster that was unsuccessfully proposed for the Land 121 Phase 3 Project. Thales has developed a Dual Cab Utility variant and a ISTAR (intelligence, surveillance, target acquisition and reconnaissance) Kit.

In January 2015, Australian Defence Magazine reported that an Electronic Warfare variant with a 6-metre (20 ft) mast is currently under development to meet an Australian requirement under the Defence Capability Plan.

In August 2022, the Army unveiled a fully electric prototype the electric Bushmaster Protected Military Vehicle (ePMV) developed with 3ME Technology in collaboration with the Defence Science and Technology Group. The ePMV will undergo road trials after a larger battery is fitted. The same month a Bushmaster fitted with solar panels by SME Praxis Labs was also unveiled.

=== Modifications ===
In September 2007, the Army reported that the fleet would be upgraded with a protected weapon system (PWS) that is stabilised with thermal imaging, camera and laser rangefinder. Other upgrades include spall curtains, fire suppression system, cool water drinking system and an additional seat following criticisms from Australian soldiers in Iraq and Afghanistan including that the gunner is exposed to enemy fire.

Between 2009 and 2012, the Protected Mobility, Troop, Command and Mortar variants in use in Afghanistan were upgraded. The upgrade included the addition of the protected remotely controlled weapons station, automated fire suppression system and ECM systems. The Special Operations Task Group vehicles were fitted with a weapon ring to mount a 12.7 mm heavy machine gun.

There was a survivability enhancement to the lower hull, floor, seat mounts and axle caps. Two adaptive roller kits were provided able to be mounted to the front of the vehicle for protection against mines or IEDs. In late 2012, the entire fleet was rotated, with new upgraded vehicles provided with increased blast protection and the option of adding extra external composited armour.

During 2012-2013, the Army purchased 11 Self Protection Adaptive Roller Kits (SPARK) mine roller Mark 2 (SMR2) for the Bushmaster.

In 2015, 45 Bushmasters had their remote weapons systems (RWS) refurbished and upgraded by the RWS manufacturer Electro Optic Systems. In 2023, the ADF stated that a number of Bushmasters would be equipped with a Battle Management System for mounted command, developed by Systematic.

In 2027, Thales will commence building a "next generation" Bushmaster (also known as Bushmaster 5.6) for the additional 268 Bushmasters ordered by Australia.

=== Civilian ===
The FireKing, a civilian firefighting variant of the Bushmaster, is operated by the South Australian Forestry Corporation (ForestySA) with 15 in service.

A Bushmaster was used in a Victoria Police operation in 2014, painted grey with police decals.

=== Foreign variants ===
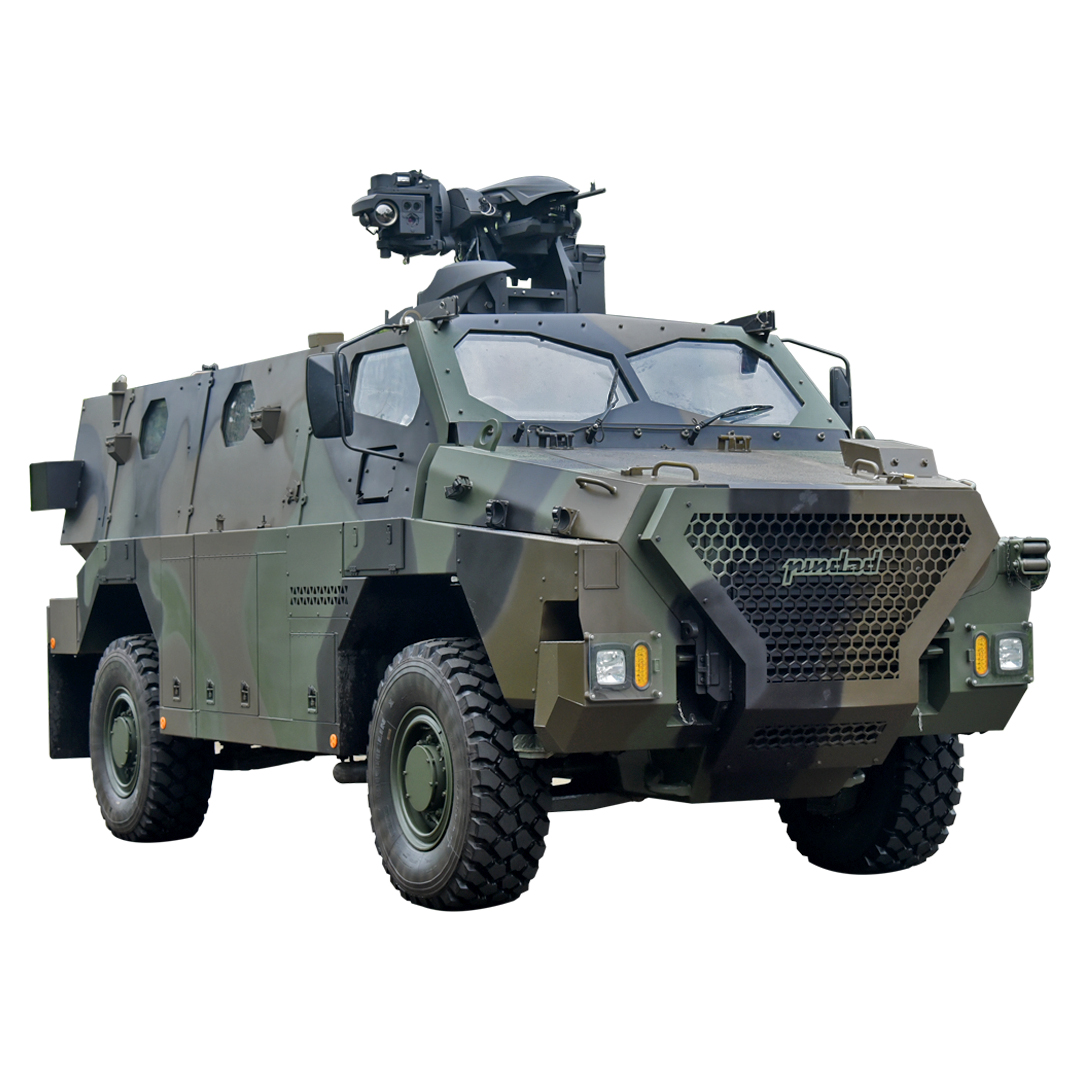
An Indonesian variant Pindad Sanca MRAP with Rheinmetall Qimek RCWS

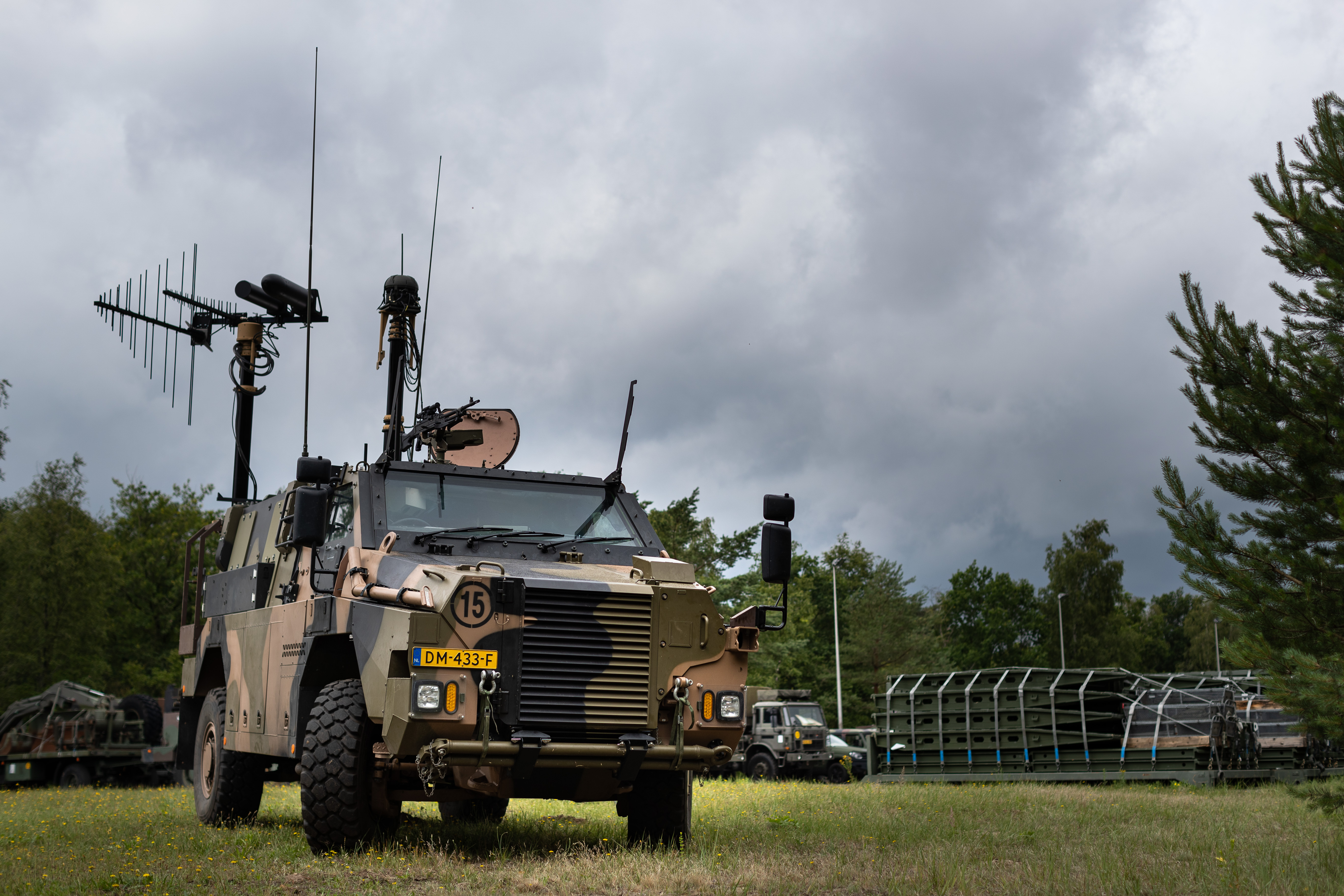
A Dutch electronic warfare Bushmaster variant in 2020

In 2007, Thales developed a 6x6 Bushmaster and partnered with Oshkosh Truck in a failed bid for the United States Army Medium Mine Protected Vehicle (MMPV) program.

In 2009, an Improvised Explosive Device (IED) interrogation variant was purchased by the Dutch Army with a hydraulic arm fitted with interrogation tool, light, camera, metal detector and proximity detector.

An Indonesian variant made by Pindad known as Sanca based on the Bushmaster but created to meet Indonesian requirements, was revealed in November 2016 after it was announced in October 2016 that Thales will work with Pindad. 50 Sancas are scheduled for delivery with 30 going to Indonesian forces stationed overseas on peacekeeping operations and 20 for Kopassus forces. Sanca means Python in the Indonesian language. The Sanca is made in collaboration with PT Len, meant to demonstrate the C5i concept (Combat Information) aside from the traditional C4 concept.

In January 2018, Thales Australia launched the MR6 variant for the British Army Multi Role Vehicle-Protected program. MR6 is an abbreviation for Multi Role 6 with the six signifying the sixth production run. The MR6 has a new hull that features front crew doors, a wider rear door and the compartment has increased height and has been extended. The driveline has a new Caterpillar C7 engine, a new heavy-duty suspension, an anti-lock braking system, a choice of two transmissions and transfer case options, a new alternator and a auxiliary power unit option. The MR6 has a new storage system, digital dash, central tyre inflation, the C4I system from the Hawkei and an improved remote weapon station that can be fitted with a 30 mm cannon. The MR6 has an extra two tonne payload.

In 2021, Thales adapted previous Bushmaster vehicle designs to produce the Bushmaster NZ5.5 for the New Zealand Army.

In February 2026, Thales Australia announced that it had developed a left-hand drive variant.

=== StrikeMaster ===
A StrikeMaster being operated by a US Marine during an exercise in Norway during 2026

The StrikeMaster Coastal Defence System based on the utility variant was developed by Thales Australia and Kongsberg for an Australian Army contract to acquire a land based maritime strike capability under LAND 8113 - Phase 2. The StrikeMaster featured a two-cell angled launcher for the Naval Strike Missile. The StrikeMaster was first tested in October 2025 in Norway, with the firing of a NSM Booster Test Vehicle. In April 2026, the M142 High Mobility Artillery Rocket System (HIMARS), firing the Land-Based Anti-Ship Missile (LBASM), was selected for LAND 8113 - Phase 2.

=== Mulga utility variant ===
In June 2026, Thales unveiled a new Bushmaster 5.6 utility variant named the Mulga at Eurosatory 2026. The Mulga variant is also available in left-hand drive. Thales said it will have "offensive capability against new threats".

== Operational service ==
=== Australia ===
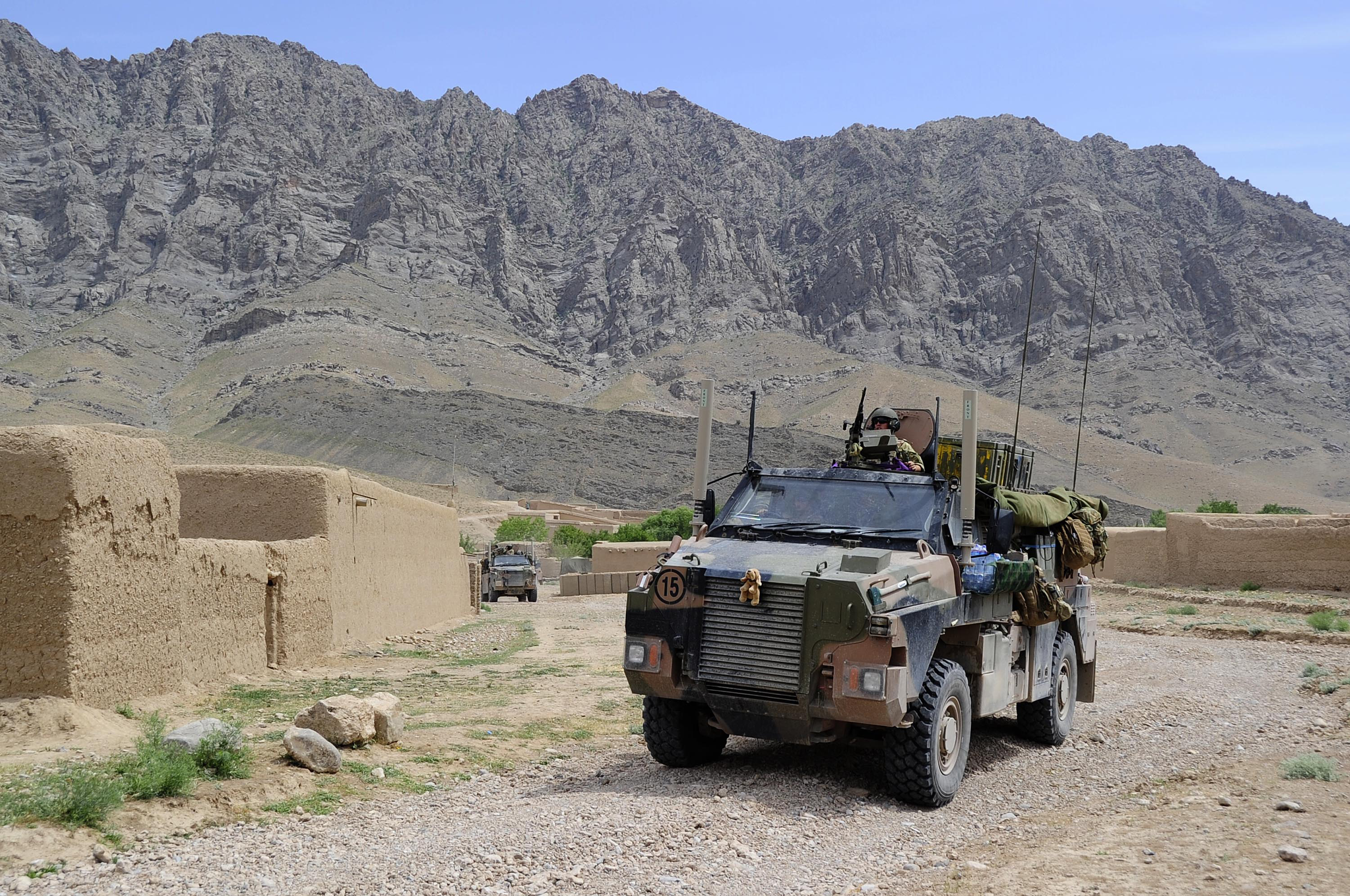
Two Bushmasters passing through a settlement in Afghanistan in April 2010

To date, Australia's Bushmasters have been deployed on five operations:

- Two prototypes were deployed to East Timor in 1999 for the International Force East Timor (INTERFET) for trials, VIP protection and media escort duties.
- Ten Bushmasters were deployed to Iraq with the Al Muthanna Task Group in May 2005. This force was later redesignated Overwatch Battle Group (West) and operated 19 Bushmasters from September 2006.
- A small number of Bushmasters were operated by Special Operations Command soldiers part of the Special Operations Task Group in Afghanistan from September 2005 after its redeployment until late 2013.
- A Company, 6th Battalion, Royal Australian Regiment was equipped with Bushmasters during its role as the security response force for the 2006 Commonwealth Games.
- The Reconstruction Task Force, later redesignated the Mentoring Task Force, which was deployed in Afghanistan from August 2006 to late 2013 was also equipped with a large number of Bushmasters.

On 17 March 2010, all five Australian soldiers from the 1st Mentoring Task Force who were occupying a Bushmaster were wounded, three of them seriously, when it was hit by a roadside bomb in the Chora Valley north of the main Australian base near Tarin Kowt in Oruzgan Province during a routine vehicle patrol. As of May 2011, 31 Bushmasters have been damaged beyond repair while serving with the Australian Army. The largest number operating in Afghanistan at one time was 104.

=== Netherlands ===
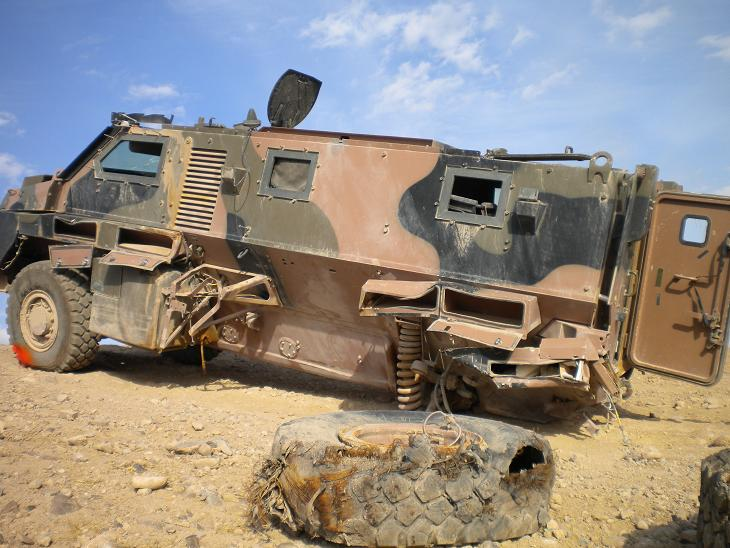
A Bushmaster damaged after striking an improvised explosive device

In July 2006 the Dutch Government announced an urgent purchase of 25 Bushmasters to equip Royal Netherlands Army units operating in Afghanistan. Due to the urgency of this purchase these vehicles were taken from Australian Army stocks. Additional Bushmasters were built by ADI to replenish the Australian inventory. 23 Bushmasters were directly delivered to Dutch Army units in Afghanistan starting from 28 August 2006. The remaining two vehicles were transported to the Netherlands to be used for training purposes. Twelve of the Bushmasters were fitted with a Thales SWARM remote weapon station before delivery.

In July 2007, Canberra based Electro Optic Systems Holdings Limited (EOS) was awarded a contract of A$5.8 million for the supply of remote weapon systems for use by the Netherlands army. The contract was awarded to EOS by Thales Australia for fitting to the Bushmaster vehicles manufactured by Thales for the Netherlands army. The order entailed 17 M101 Common Remotely Operated Weapon Stations (CROWS). It was expected that the first of these systems would be operational in theatre by August 2007.

On 20 September 2007, during an engagement with the Taliban a 20-year-old Dutch soldier was killed in action. His body was evacuated in a Bushmaster which was attacked with small arms, mortars and RPGs. The vehicle was struck several times but all soldiers in the Bushmaster survived and were unhurt. Since the vehicle was immobilized and still under attack, they were forced to abandon it. Since salvage was not possible the Bushmaster was later destroyed by a Dutch Apache helicopter. The troops were transported out of danger by a second Bushmaster IMV.

On 19 October 2007 during a firefight between a Dutch patrol and Taliban insurgents, a Bushmaster was hit by an improvised bomb. Although none of the passengers were hurt, the bomb damaged the front of the Bushmaster. The Bushmaster was sent to Multi National Base Tarin Kot (Kamp Holland) (the Dutch base) for repairs.

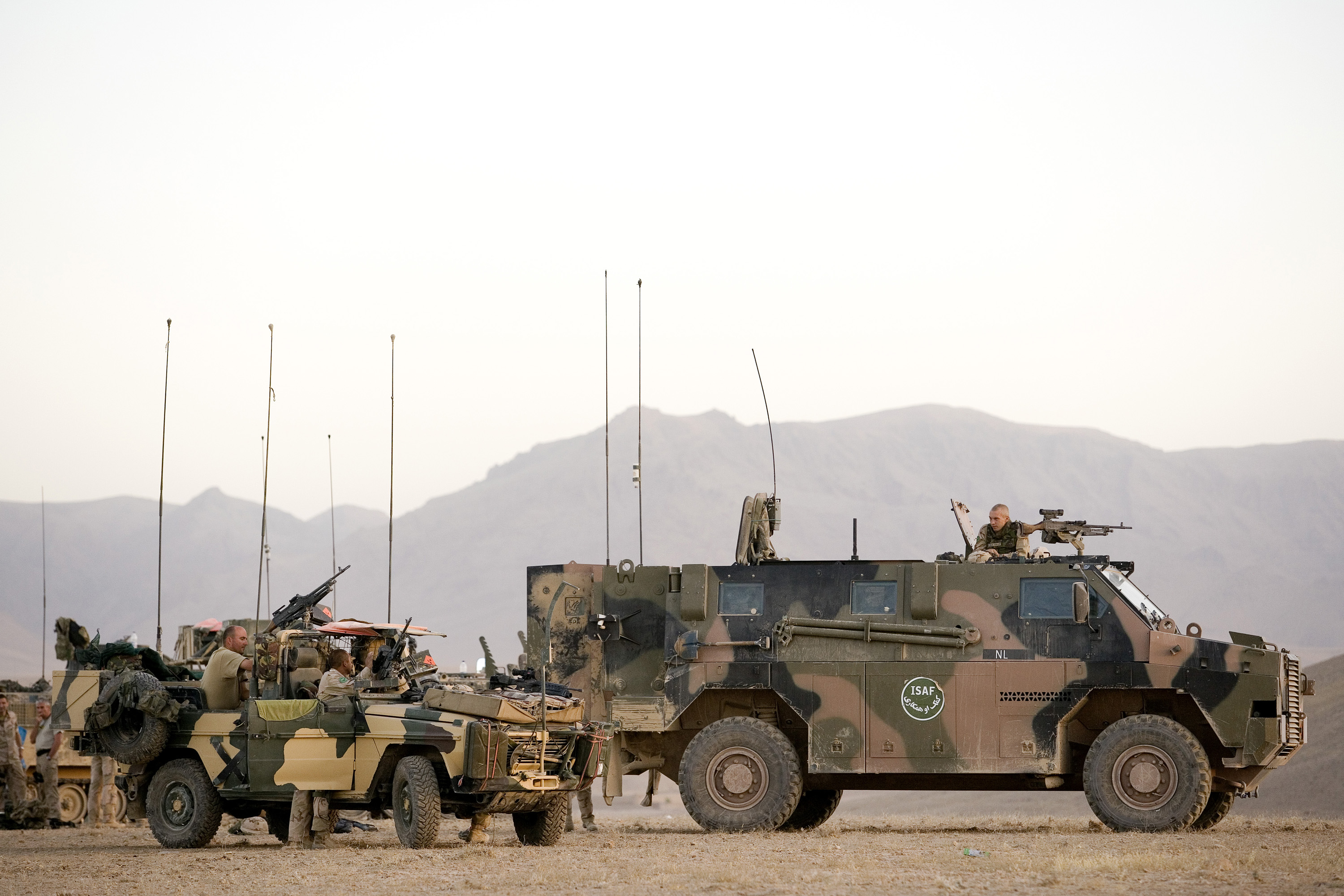
A Dutch Bushmaster in Afghanistan in 2007

The Netherlands ordered additional Bushmasters on several occasions in 2007 and 2008. On 20 November 2007 the Dutch Defence Ministry announced that it would acquire an additional 10 vehicles to replace the two damaged and two destroyed vehicles and a Patria armoured vehicle which was also destroyed in Uruzgan. One vehicle would be sent to the Netherlands for training purposes, and the rest go directly to Afghanistan. The Dutch ordered a further 13 Bushmasters in June 2008, taking their total order to 49 vehicles. At this time six Dutch Bushmasters had been destroyed in Afghanistan.

In January 2009, another batch of nine vehicles was ordered, these vehicles to be fitted with cameras, sensors and an interrogation arm to find and destroy improvised explosive devices (IEDs). A further 14 Bushmasters were ordered in June 2009. In August 2009, another 14 vehicles were ordered, bringing the total Dutch order to 86. Dutch special forces deployed as part of the Northern Mali conflict from April 2014 were equipped with a number of Bushmasters. In May 2015 a Dutch Bushmaster was struck by an IED near Kidal. No one was hurt by this incident and the Bushmaster was returned to the Dutch camp at Gao. In June 2015, a further 12 were ordered. In July 2020 the Dutch Army took delivery of its first Multirole Electronic Warfare Bushmaster. In April 2026, the Australian government announced that the Netherlands will acquire an disclosed number of additional Bushmasters.

=== United Kingdom ===
The British Army acquired 24 Bushmasters in April 2008 specifically for use in Iraq to support Task Force Black and United Kingdom Special Forces (UKSF) operations around Basra. The heavily modified vehicles, known as the Escapade, were used to provide armoured transport for strike teams.

Features included an increased armour package, bullbar, ECM and anti-IED suites, and a CROWS RWS fitted with an M2 .50 calibre machine gun. The UKSF had been using an armoured hull protected vehicle in Afghanistan the Supacat HMT 400 since 2003. The Bushmaster provided all-round protection, compared to the HMT 400 with an exposed crew, that was required in built-up urban areas in Iraq. UKSF left Iraq in May 2009.

In 2016, the Escapade was used in the Battle of Mosul during the Iraqi Civil War. In 2017, the Escapade was used in the Battle of Raqqa during the Syrian Civil War.

=== Ukraine ===
During the 2022 Russian invasion of Ukraine, following Ukrainian president Volodymyr Zelenskyy's address to the Australian Parliament on 31 March 2022 and a request for Bushmasters, Prime Minister Scott Morrison agreed to give 20 Bushmasters to Ukraine on 8 April 2022. They were to be flown to Europe on RAAF C-17 transports, which can carry 4 vehicles at a time. The Bushmasters were fitted with remote weapon stations and included two ambulance variants.

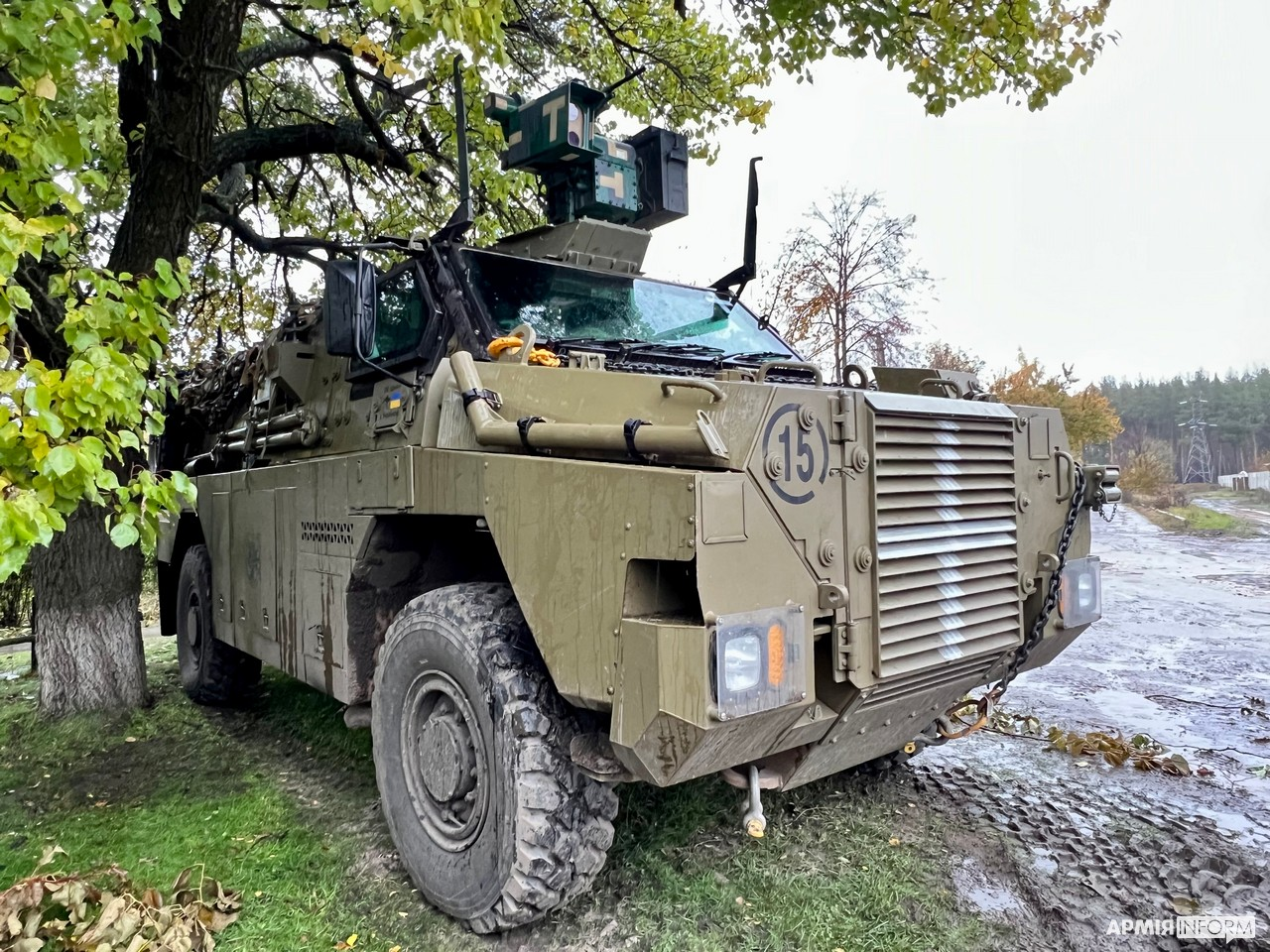
A Ukrainian Bushmaster during the 2022 Russian invasion of Ukraine

On 19 May 2022, Defence Minister Peter Dutton announced that Australia would give a further 20 Bushmasters. On 4 July 2022, during Prime Minister Anthony Albanese's visit to Ukraine he announced an additional 20 Bushmasters would be donated.

On 15 September 2022, ABC News reported that the Ukrainian ambassador to Australia Vasyl Myroshnychenko had made a request to the Australian government for an additional 30 Bushmasters. ABC News reported that 40 of the 60 Bushmasters had been delivered. Myroshnychenko said that the Bushmasters were being “used almost as infantry fighting vehicles – though they are not that – because we don't have anything else". On 27 October 2022, Prime Minister Anthony Albanese announced an additional 30 Bushmasters would be donated, bringing the total up to 90. On 12 July 2023, Prime Minister Anthony Albanese announced an additional 30 Bushmasters would be donated, bringing the total up to 120.

On 29 May 2022, the Australian Financial Review reported that there was a video confirming the destruction of one Bushmaster by Russian troops in Trypillia, Donetsk. The driver of another Bushmaster who was close to the attack when it happened praised the quality of the vehicle, saying everyone survived the attack.

Other sources report that within weeks of their arriving at least three had been destroyed in action. It is understood that those aboard escaped from two of the destroyed vehicles but the third was hit by an anti-tank weapon and the soldiers it carried were killed.

Bushmasters were used for moving troops during the 2022 Ukrainian Kharkiv counteroffensive.

President Zelenskyy in an address to the Lowy Institute think tank on 6 October 2022 praised the Bushmasters saying "This equipment has performed masterfully in real combat operations". According to Oryx, 14 Bushmasters have been destroyed and 4 damaged by Russian forces.

== Operators ==
A map of Bushmaster operators in blue

=== Current operators ===
Australia (1,015 received, 763 in use, 405 on order)
1,015 Bushmasters were delivered to the Australian Defence Force.
As of November 2023, the Army had 763 Bushmasters available for use.
In May 2023, Australia ordered an additional 78 Bushmasters.
In July 2024, Australia ordered an additional 15 Bushmasters.
In January 2025, Australia ordered an additional 44 Bushmasters.
In April 2026, Australia ordered 268 "next generation" Bushmasters.
Fiji (10)
10 refurbished Bushmasters purchased in 2017 from Australian Defence Force stock, seven for use in peacekeeping as part of the United Nations Disengagement Observer Force (UNDOF) in the Golan Heights and three for training purposes in Fiji. In March 2017, the seven Republic of Fiji Military Forces Bushmasters arrived in the Golan Heights. In October 2023, Fiji ordered an additional 14 Bushmasters for peacekeeping operations.
Indonesia
4 vehicles operated by Indonesia. In 2014, 3 vehicles were delivered to the Indonesian Army Special Forces Command Kopassus. 50 Sanca variant ordered for overseas forces and Kopassus. In September 2021, Australia announced that it would donate 15 Bushmasters to Indonesia to support peacekeeping missions.
Jamaica (18)
18 total Bushmasters. 12 ordered in December 2013 to replace the Jamaica Defence Force's fourteen Cadillac Gage V150s. Deliveries began in mid-2015, and were completed in early 2016. An additional 6 Bushmasters were ordered in 2020.
Japan (8)
8 vehicles operated by the Japan Ground Self-Defense Force. An initial order of 4 was placed in 2014 for the Central Readiness Regiment (CRR) to enable the CRR to evacuate Japanese citizens in the event of an overseas emergency. In 2018, a second order was received of 4 more vehicles for the CRR.
Netherlands (102)
98 Bushmasters ordered; the Netherlands is the second largest operator of the Bushmaster. In operational use by the Dutch Army and Royal Dutch Marines. In 2021, the Netherlands received an additional 6 vehicles: 5 custom ambulances and a troop carrier.
102 are operational as of 2024, and are being modernised.
The variants in service are:
- General service
- Command posts
- Driver training vehicle
- Maintenance diagnosis and recovery
- Multirole EOV "Knifefish" (electronic warfare)
- Casualty evacuation
- Engineering vehicle
- Explosive ordinance disposal
In April 2026, an undisclosed number of additional Bushmasters were purchased by the Netherlands. It has been reported that it is between 25-30 Bushmasters.
New Zealand (48)
43 vehicles operated by the New Zealand Army. 5 Bushmasters operated by the New Zealand Special Air Service (NZSAS) designated as the Special Operations Vehicle – Protected Heavy (SOV-PH). A memorandum of sale had been under negotiation with the Australian Defence Force for the transfer of the Bushmasters in 2017. In 2018, the NZ Ministry of Defence reported it had been signed. In July 2020, the New Zealand Ministry of Defence ordered 43 NZ5.5 variants with deliveries throughout 2023.
Ukraine (120 donated by Australia)
120 Bushmasters were gifted to Ukraine in 2022-2023 by the Australian Government for the Ukrainian Ground Forces to aid in the 2022 Russian invasion of Ukraine. The 120 vehicles were gifted in four batches in 2022 in April, May, July and October, and a fifth batch in July 2023. As of December 2025, Oryx reported that 47 Bushmasters had been destroyed, 5 damaged and 3 captured by the Russians.
United Kingdom (24)
24 Bushmasters purchased in April 2008. British vehicles are fitted with additional armour, electronics to counter IEDs and a .50 calibre machine gun mounted in a RWS.

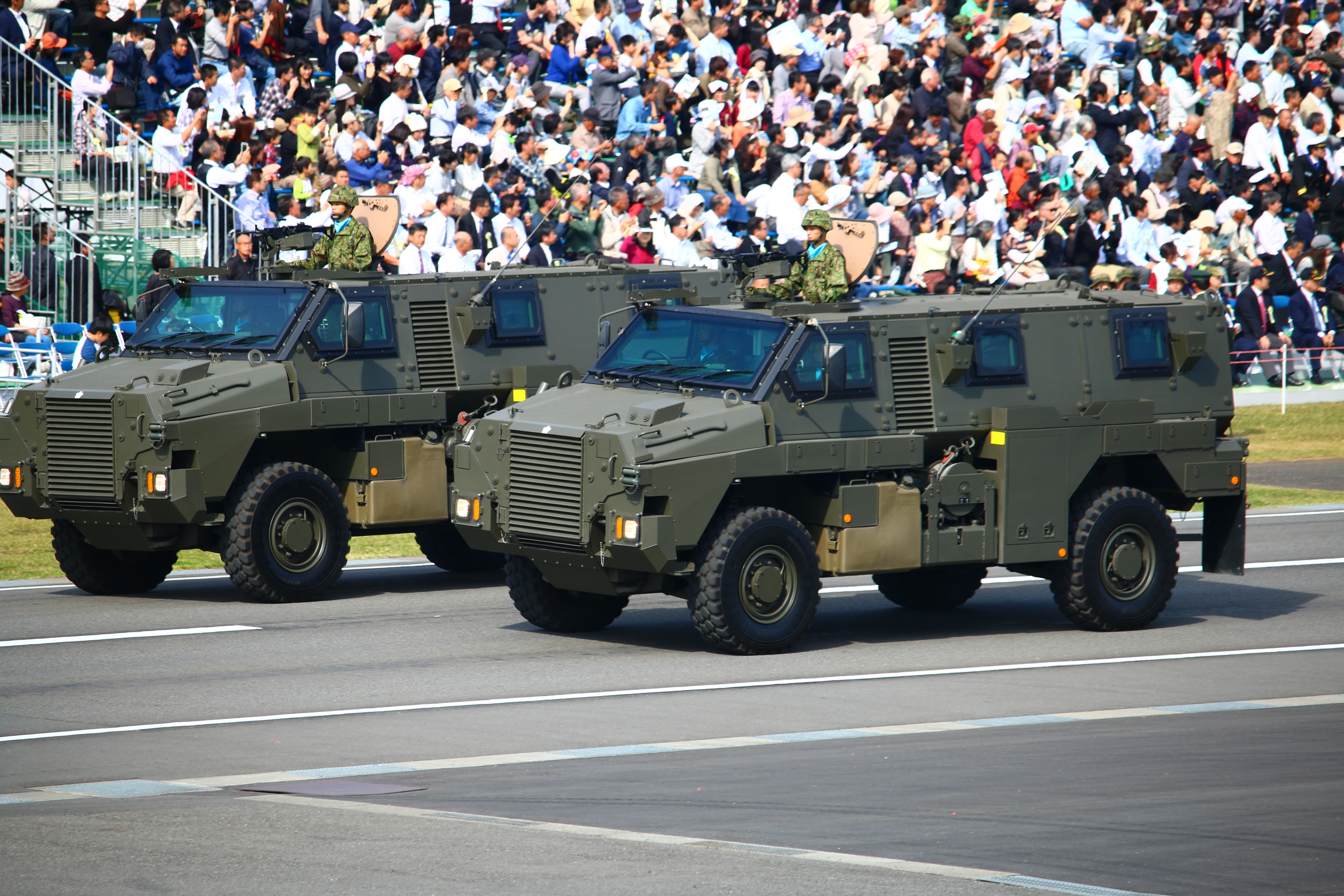
Two Bushmasters in service with the Japan Ground Self-Defense Force's Central Readiness Regiment.

=== Trials and interest ===
Libya
Expressed interest in 100–400 vehicles.
Spain
In August 2008, it was reported that the Spanish Government was "showing strong interest in the Bushmaster".
United Arab Emirates
Trialled only.

=== Failed bids ===
Canada
A bid was submitted with Thales Canada and DEW Engineering for the Tactical Armored Vehicle Program, but later withdrawn when the Canadian government decided it wanted a smaller vehicle; the competition was ultimately won by Textron with a modified M1117, tailored to Canadian requirements.
France
The Bushmaster, under the name Broussard (French "Bushman"), competed against a lightened version of Nexter's VBCI and the Renault AMC for a 2,300 vehicle contract to replace the French Army's VABs. France finally selected the Nexter VBMR Griffon.
United States
Thales partnered with US truck manufacturer Oshkosh to bid for the Mine-Resistant Ambush Protected (MRAP) program and the Medium Mine Protected Vehicle (MMPV) program. The Thales bid for the MRAP program failed. Thales developed a 6x6 Bushmaster for the MMPV program and submitted two variants: one fitted with an interrogator arm and the other a robot carrier.

== See also ==
- Hawkei PMV – (Australia)
