= Ranger Courses =

Japanese military training courses

Rangers
- レンジャー
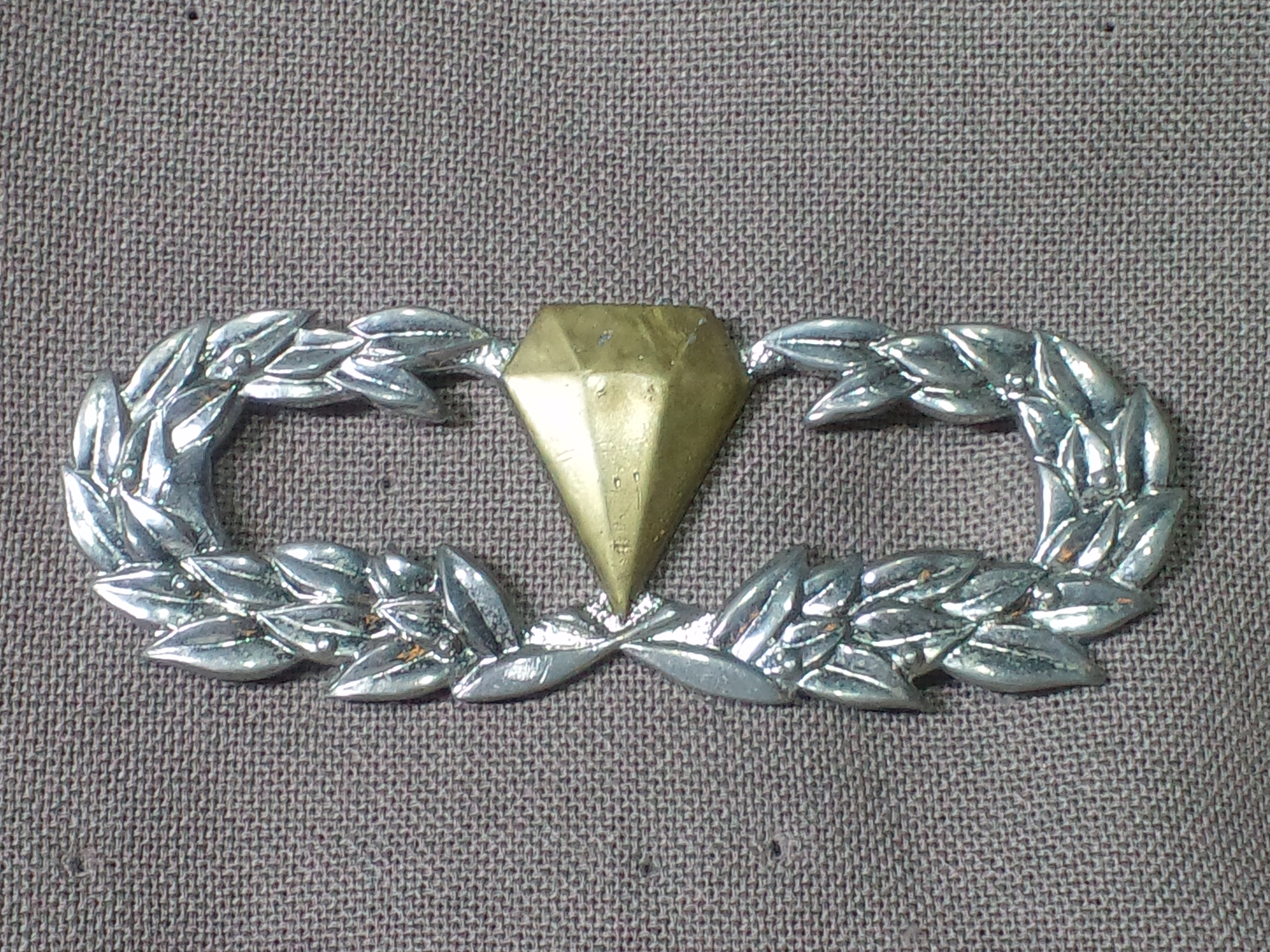
- Ranger pin badge as used in the JSDF.
- Active: 1956–present
- Country: Japan
- Branch: Japan Ground Self-Defense Force
- Type: Special Forces-type training courses
- Garrison/HQ: Fuji Training School, JGSDF Camp Fuji

Insignia
- Identification symbol: Ranger Pin Badge

The Ranger Courses (レンジャー課程, Renjā-katei) are military education and training courses oriented toward Commando operations in the Japanese Ground Self-Defense Force (JGSDF). (Note: As official names, Fuji Courses, Airborne Ranger Course and Winter Ranger Course are distinguished as Katei-kyōiku (課程教育) being supervised by Ground Staff Office officially, and local courses are Shūgo-kyōiku (集合教育) of each units own.)

== History ==
The original course that is still held at Fuji School was established in 1956 by two JGSDF officers who had graduated from the United States Army Ranger School. This course was basically the Japanese version of the American Ranger School at the beginning.

In 1960, local ranger courses were started by each infantry regiment. As ranger courses continued to be carried out in various JGSDF units, they developed according to the country's geography.

== Ranger Courses ==
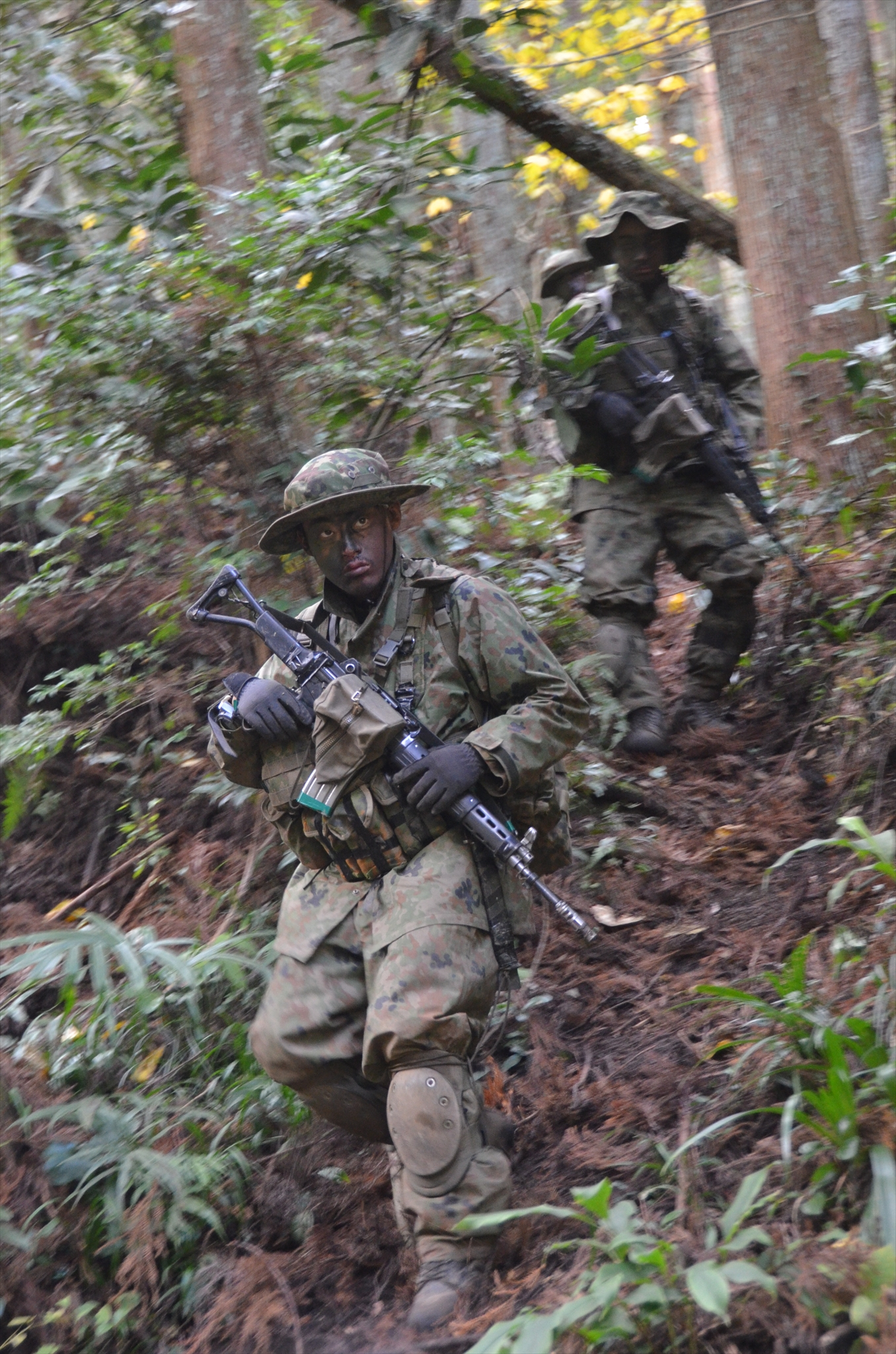
Airborne Ranger students during exercise.

Generally, there are four types of Ranger Courses as follows, but all courses are known for their severe harshness so only eligible soldiers can take these courses:

Local courses
Enlisted ranks can take Ranger Courses with their divisions, brigades and regiments. These courses are conducted by instructors who have completed the Fuji School course, but are localized according to the area in charge of each unit. For example, there is the Japanese Alps in the area of responsibility for the 13th Infantry Regiment (Matsumoto, Nagano), so its Ranger Courses focus on mountain warfare and are known as the "Alpen Ranger".
After heavy physical training, nine exercises are held in the ordinary local course for nine weeks while enduring great mental and psychological stresses and physical fatigue, and the following skills are acquired:
- Navigation (Note: According to Warrant Officer Susumu Takahashi, prospective Ranger candidates are first trained to handle paper maps and compasses.)
- Demolition
- Military communications
- Waterborne infiltration
- Air assault
- Survival skills
- Mountaineering skills
- Special reconnaissance
At Fuji School (at the base of Mount Fuji)
Course instructor candidates and officers need to complete the 13-week course at the Fuji School. Those who complete this course are specifically qualified to wear a gold badge.
At Narashino (Chiba Prefecture)
The 1st Airborne Brigade aims to give ranger training to all the members and implements its own Airborne Ranger Courses.
At Niseko (Hokkaido)
Winter Ranger Course (冬季遊撃課程, Tōki-Yūgeki-katei) is established by Cold Weather Combat Training Unit (冬季戦技教育隊, Tōki Sengi Kyōiku-tai). This is advanced post-graduate ranger training for cold-weather warfare, thus soldiers who have completed this course are entitled to wear special badges, in addition to regular ranger badges.

JGSDF soldiers are not the only ones to participate in the courses. Air Self Defense Force paramedics (Japanese counterparts of the United States Air Force Pararescuemen) have also participated in Airborne Ranger Courses. JGSDF rangers are known as pioneers of rope and mountain rescue techniques, thus eligible members of civilian law enforcement and rescue organizations (Mountain security squads of the police and Rescue Technicians of the fire departments, (Note: They're known as Super Rangers in English literature in Japan with various fire departments/bureaus.) for example) can take Ranger Courses arranged for search and rescue operations.

Scenes of local courses

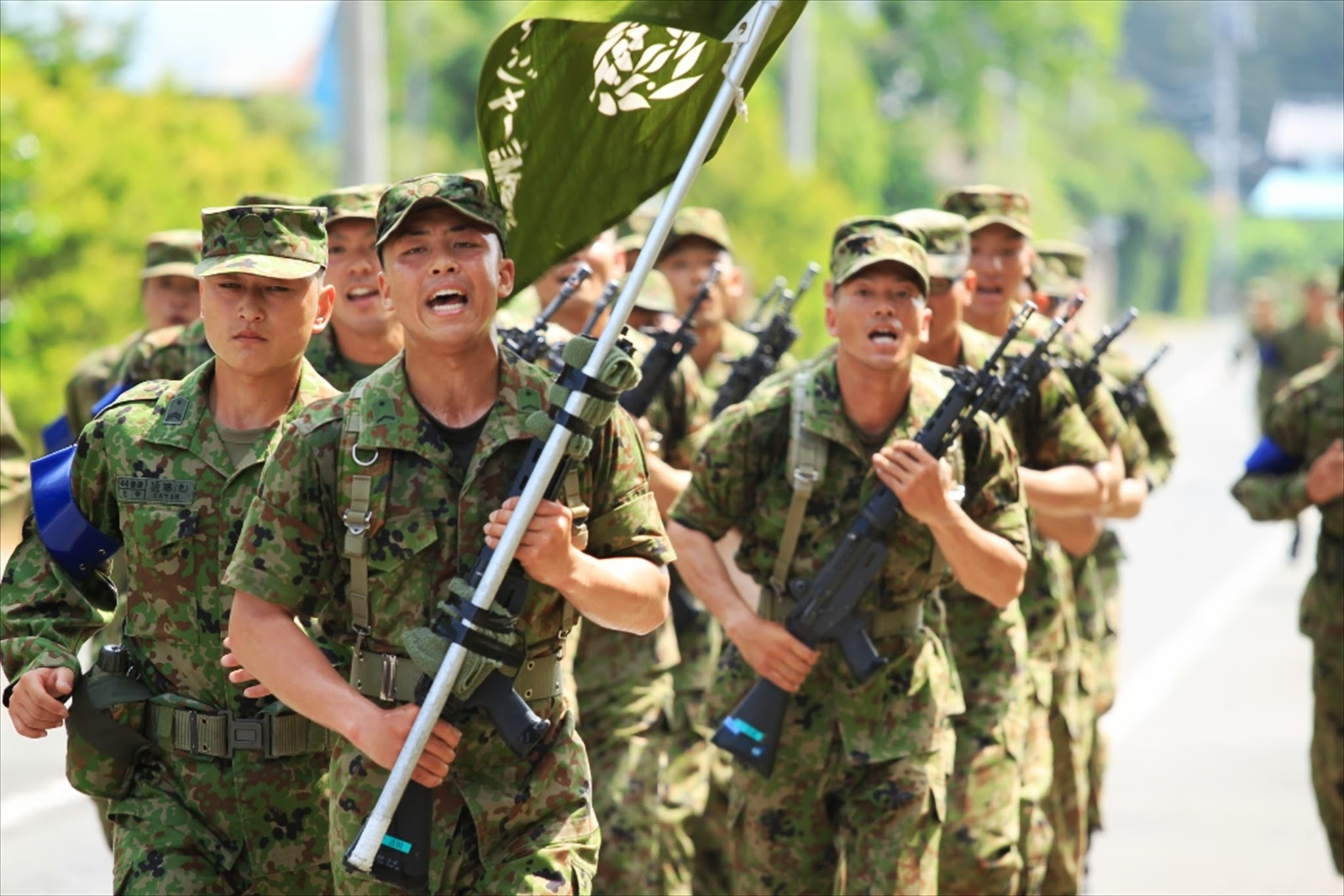
Physical training: 10-mile run with the Ranger flag in the lead

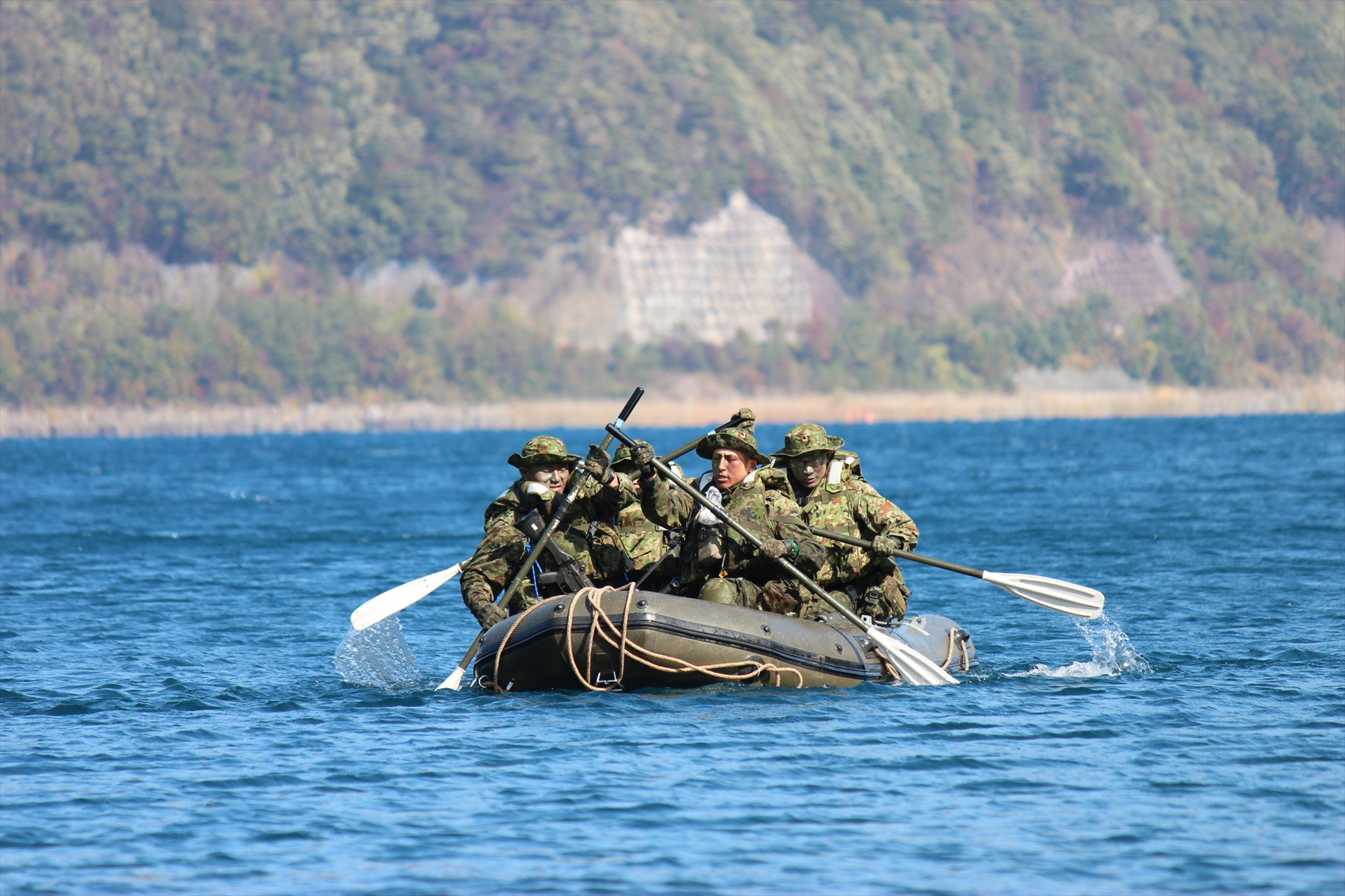
Waterborne infiltration by an inflatable boat

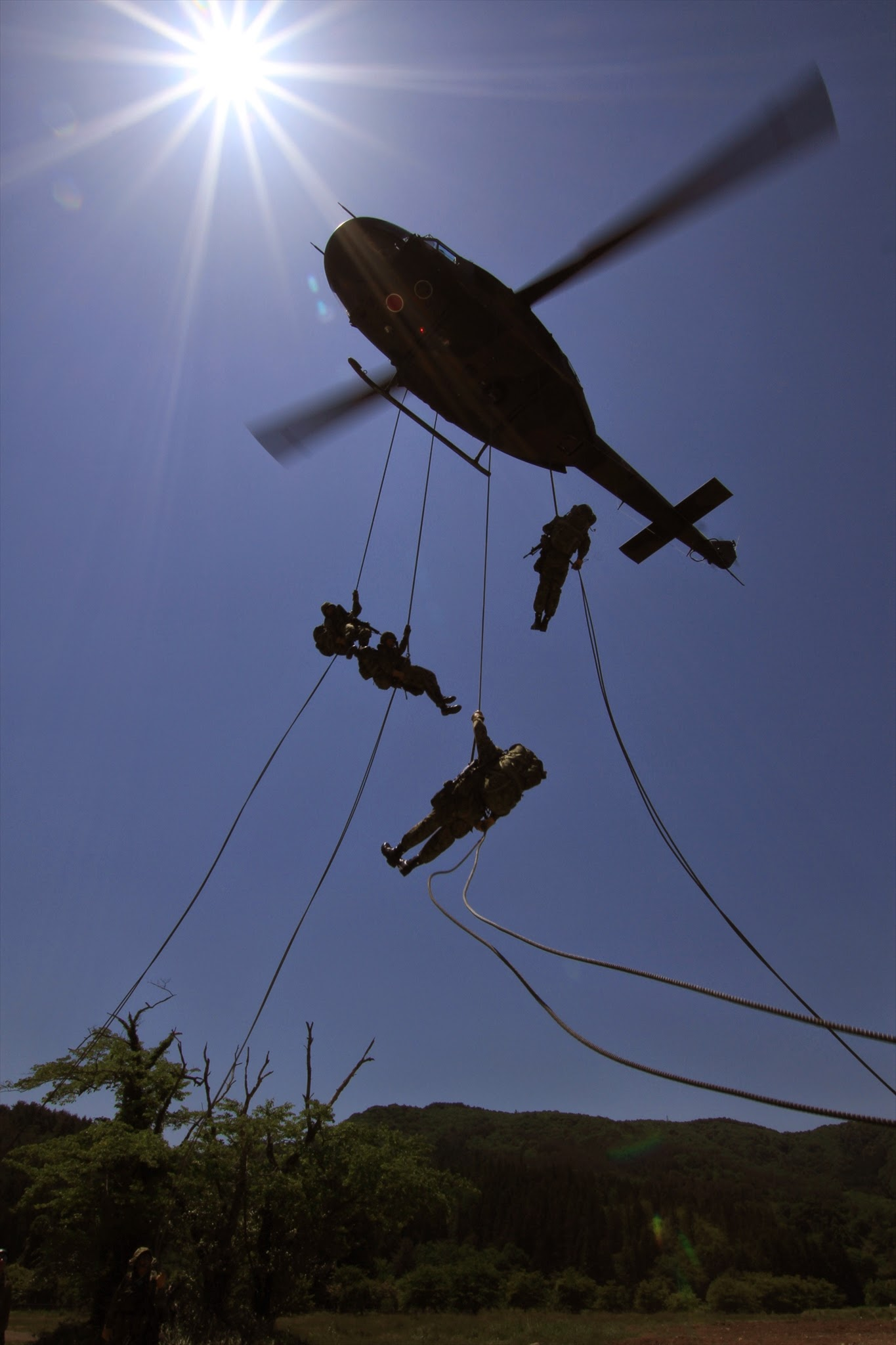
Air assault: rappelling from a Bell-Fuji UH-1J

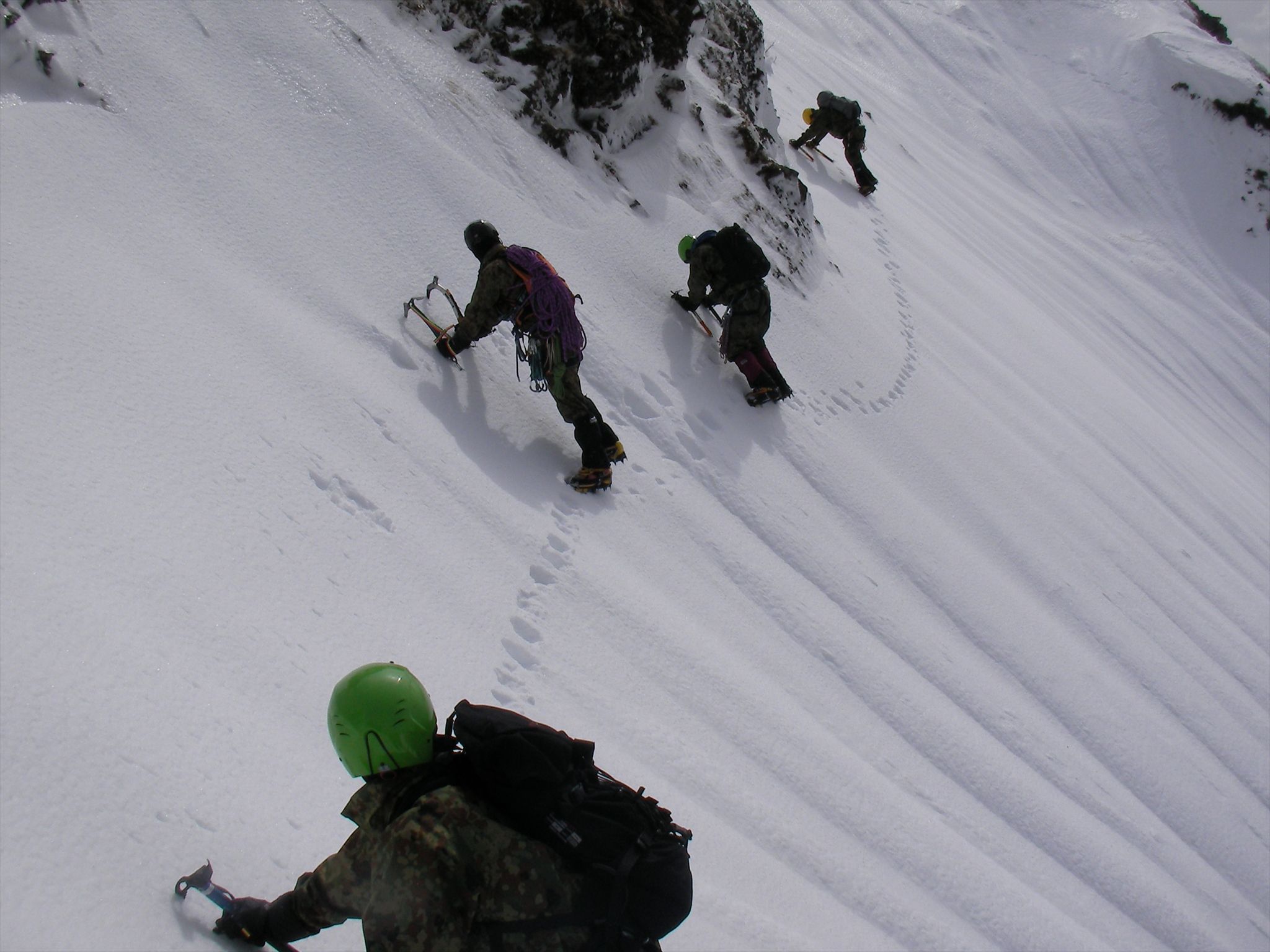
"Alpen Ranger" course

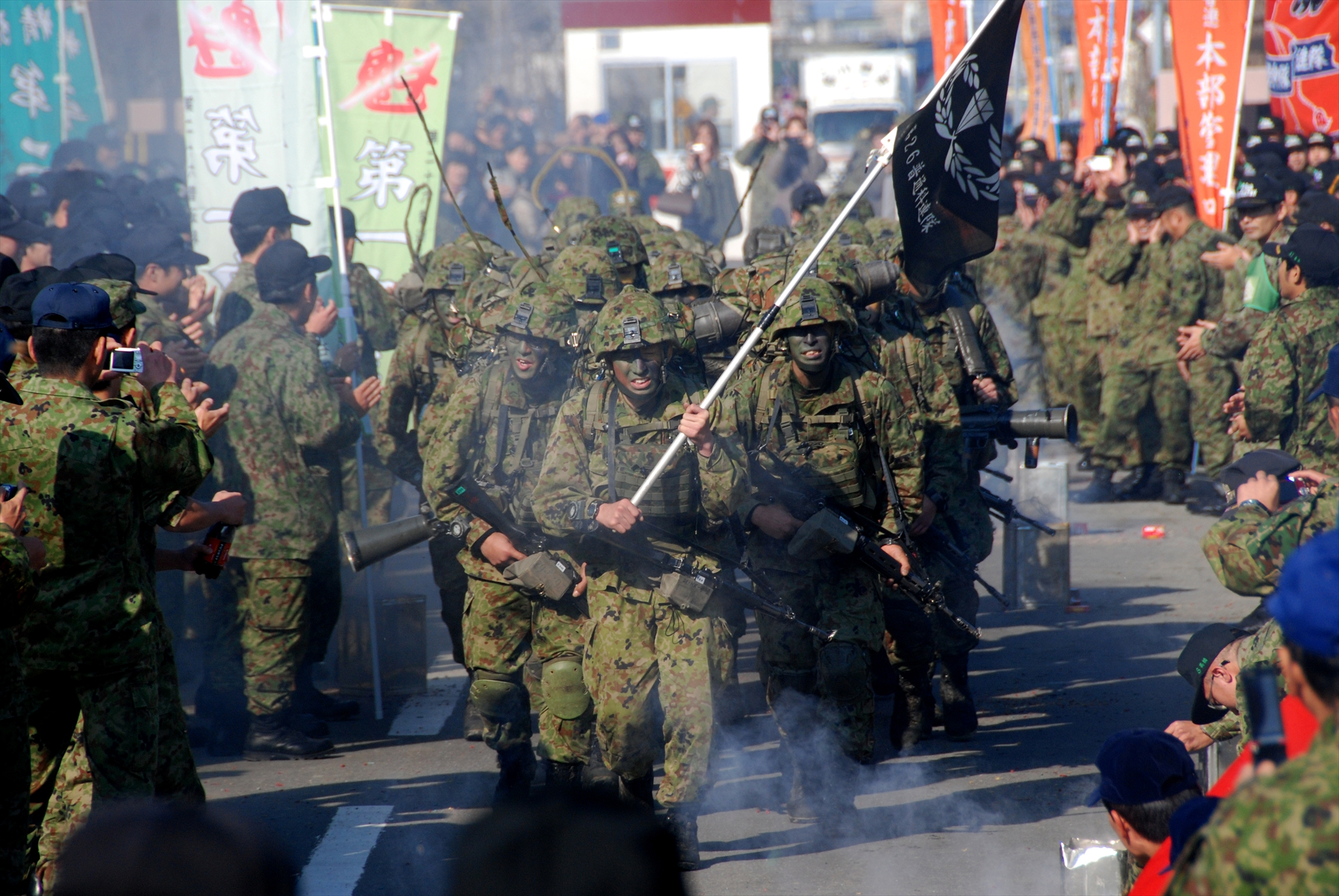
Marching at the end of the final exercise while other soldiers cheer them on.

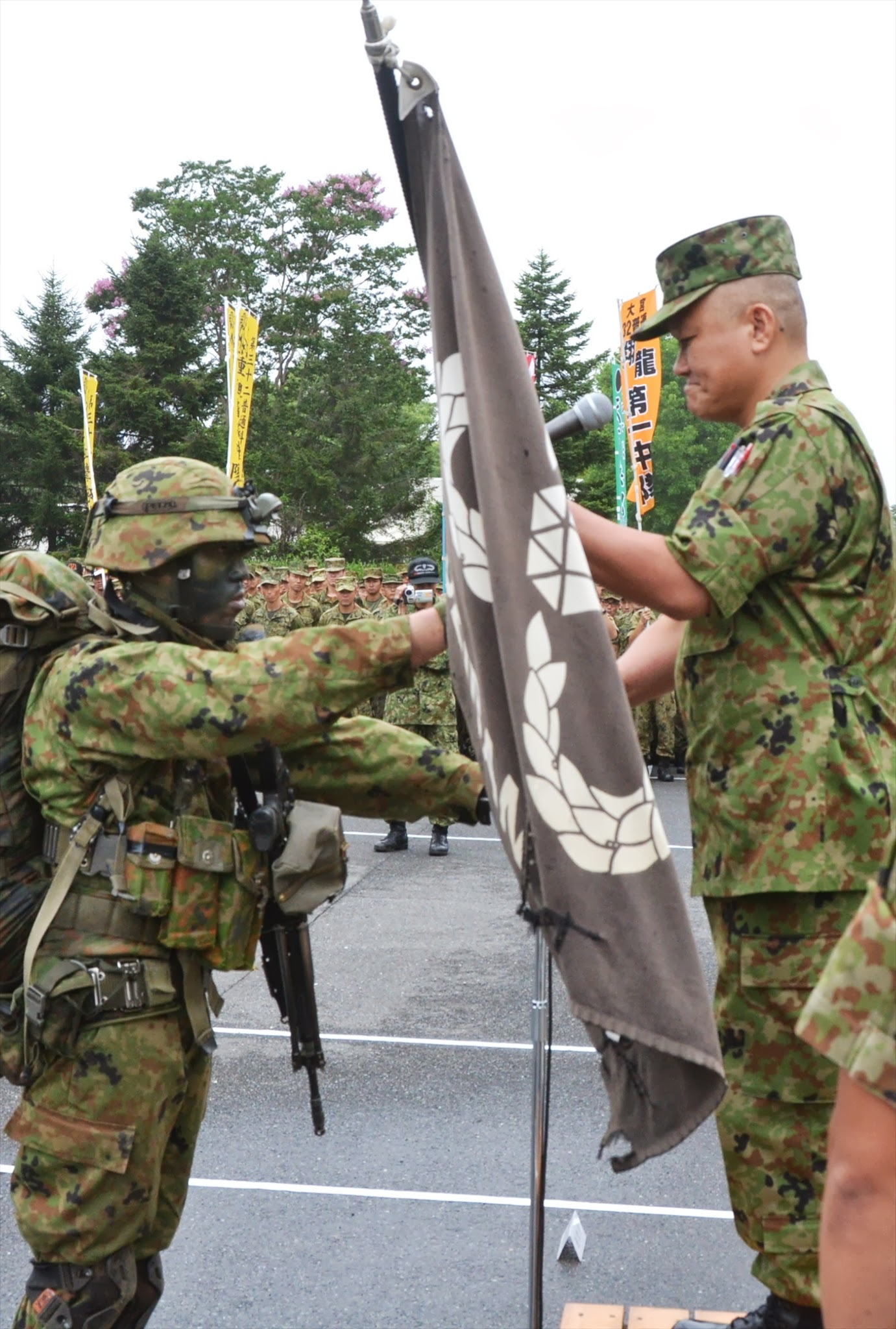
Return of the Ranger flag in the completion ceremony

== Deployment ==
Unlike the United States Army Rangers, the JGSDF has adopted a policy to improve the level of the whole forces by distributing rangers to each units, thus the unit consisting only of rangers was not established except for the training units in the Fuji School and CWCT. But in case of special operations or disaster response, commanding officers may gather Rangers and organize Ranger units temporarily.

When Western Army Infantry Regiment (WAiR; later expanded to Amphibious Rapid Deployment Brigade) was launched in 2002, Ranger platoons were set up in this regiment. These platoons are certified as special operation units. In 2012, they conducted joint landing exercises with the United States Marine Corps in Guam.
