= List of Mamor cover models =

November 2019 cover of Mamor, featuring voice actress Ami Maeshima at Fuchū Air Base

The following is a chronological history of cover models who have appeared on the front cover of the Japanese magazine Mamor.

Mamor is the official magazine of the Japan Self-Defense Forces and Ministry of Defense, released on a monthly basis since November 2006. Compared to other military publications, it is unique in using female models such as voice actresses and gravure idols for the cover and centerfold. Such a model is called a "Goddess of the Defenders", and she is typically depicted wearing a uniform at a JSDF base where the issue's feature story is located. The cover has also occasionally featured JSDF personnel, male celebrities, and fictional characters. Starting in 2027, a male cover model would be called a "Hero of the Defenders".

During the first year of publication, Mamor's covers were solely of military equipment while the month's Goddess of the Defenders was in the centerfold. With approval from the Defense Ministry, the magazine switched to having the model on the cover to draw interest from young men. Editor-in-chief Takaku Yutaka explained in a 2017 interview:

"If a celebrity is on the cover, you think, 'My favorite girl XX is in it, so I'll buy it,' right? Thanks to that, since we started putting celebrities on the cover, we've received a lot of emails and postcards from people saying, 'I've never bought a magazine like this before, but I bought it because XX is on it.'"

== 2000s ==
=== 2006–2007 ===
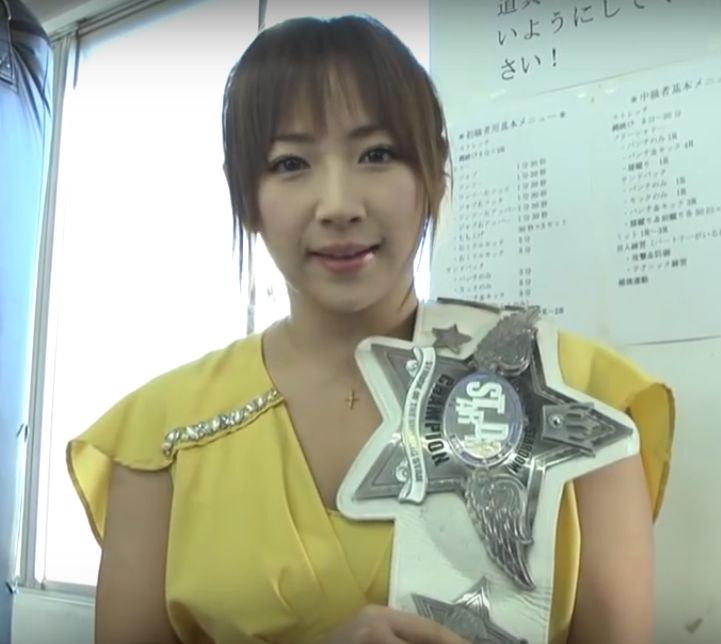
Yuzuki Aikawa, the first Goddess of the Defenders

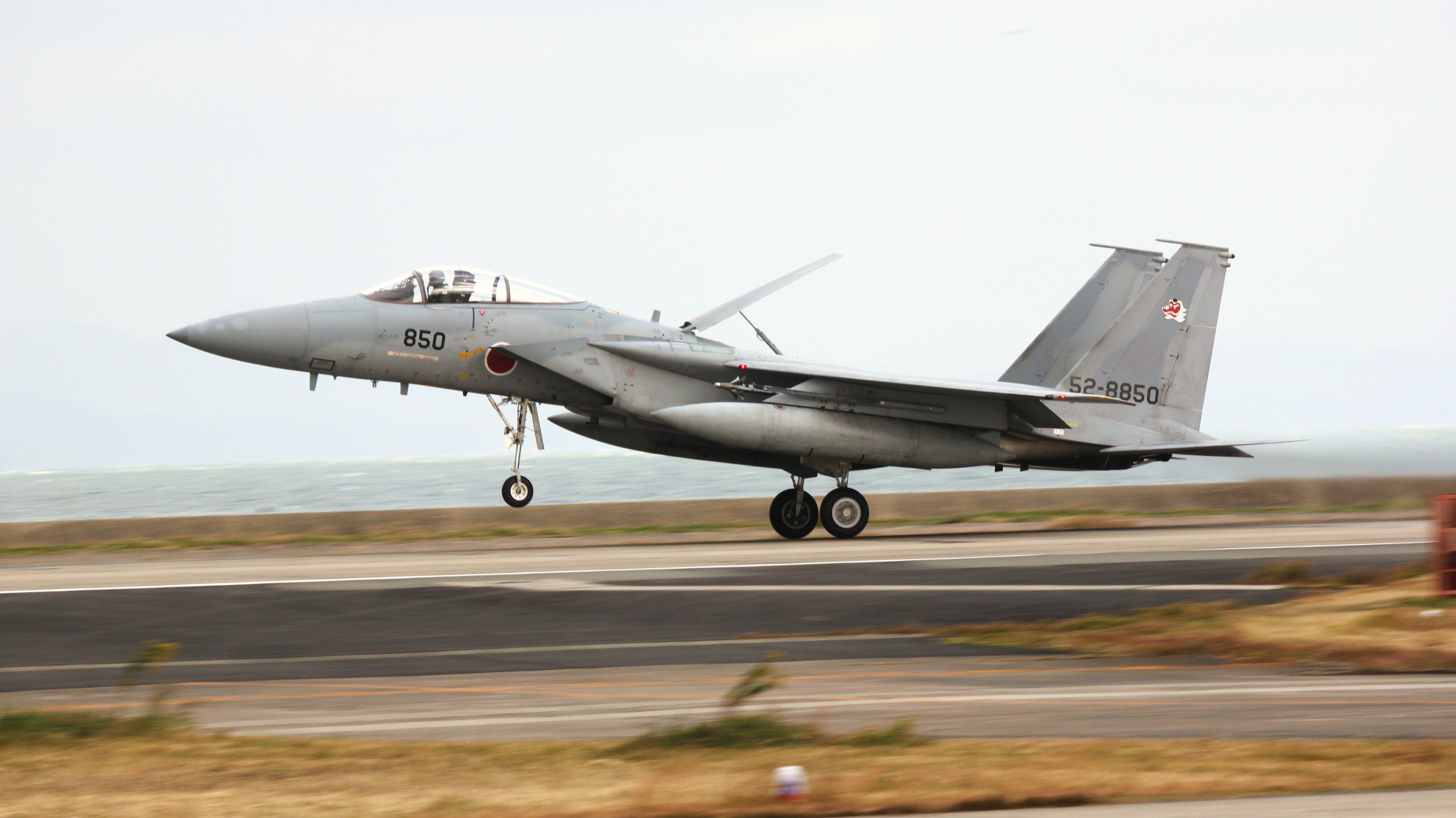
A Mitsubishi F-15J was on the first Mamor cover

| Issue | Name | Location | Notes | Ref |
|---|---|---|---|---|
| November 2006 | Yuzuki Aikawa | Hyakuri Airfield | Mitsubishi F-15J on cover. | |
| March 2007 | Jun Natsukawa | Camp Asaka | JS Kurama on cover. | |
| April | Rina Nagasaki | JMSDF Yokosuka Naval Base | Type 90 tank on cover. | |
| May | Eriko Sato | Camp Asaka | Lockheed C-130 Hercules on cover. | |
| June | Momoko Komachi | Hyakuri Airfield | Landing Craft Air Cushion on cover. | |
| July | Yuika Motokariya | National Defense Academy of Japan | Boeing AH-64 Apache on cover. | |
| August | Mikie Hara | Hyakuri Airfield | F-4EJ Kai on cover. | |
| September | Erika Mochizuki | Naval Air Facility Atsugi | M270 Multiple Launch Rocket System on cover. | |
| October | Shōko Hamada | Camp Nerima | Kawasaki P-3C Orion on cover. | |
| November | None | | Boeing E-767's AWACS on cover. | |
| December | Hiromi Kitagawa | JMSDF Yokosuka Naval Base | Fuji Comprehensive Firepower Exercise on cover. | |

=== 2008 ===
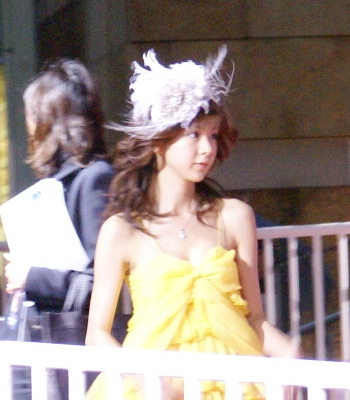
Aki Hoshino, the first person to appear on the cover as the March 2008 model

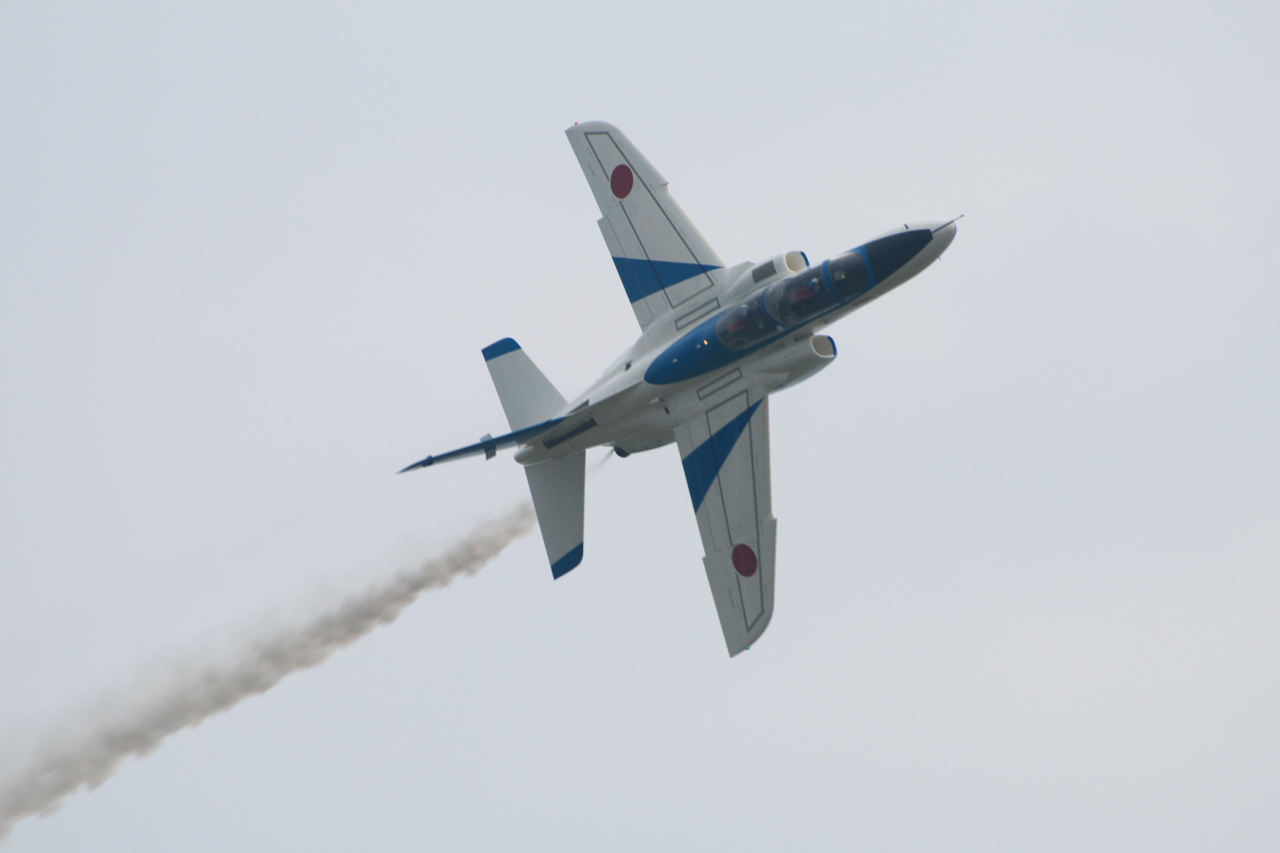
A Blue Impulse Kawasaki T-4 marked the last time a Mamor cover did not feature a person

| Issue | Name | Location | Notes | Ref |
|---|---|---|---|---|
| January | Eiko Koike | Ministry of Defense headquarters, Ichigaya | Icebreaker Shirase on cover. | |
| February | Haruna Yabuki | Iruma Air Base | Kawasaki T-4 from the Blue Impulse aerobatic team on cover. | |
| March | Aki Hoshino | Ministry of Defense headquarters, Ichigaya | First cover with the Goddess of the Defender. | |
| April | Mayuko Iwasa | Camp Asaka | | |
| May | Wakana Matsumoto | Iruma Air Base | | |
| June | Yukie Kawamura | Naval Air Facility Atsugi | | |
| July | Saya Kazuki | JSDF Central Hospital, Mishuku | | |
| August | Mai Satoda | Iruma Air Base | | |
| September | Mami Yamazaki | Camp Asaka | | |
| October | Satoshi Tokushige | | First cover with a male model. | |
| November | Sayaka Isoyama | Camp Youga | | |
| December | Yuka Kosaka | Tachikawa Airfield | | |

=== 2009 ===
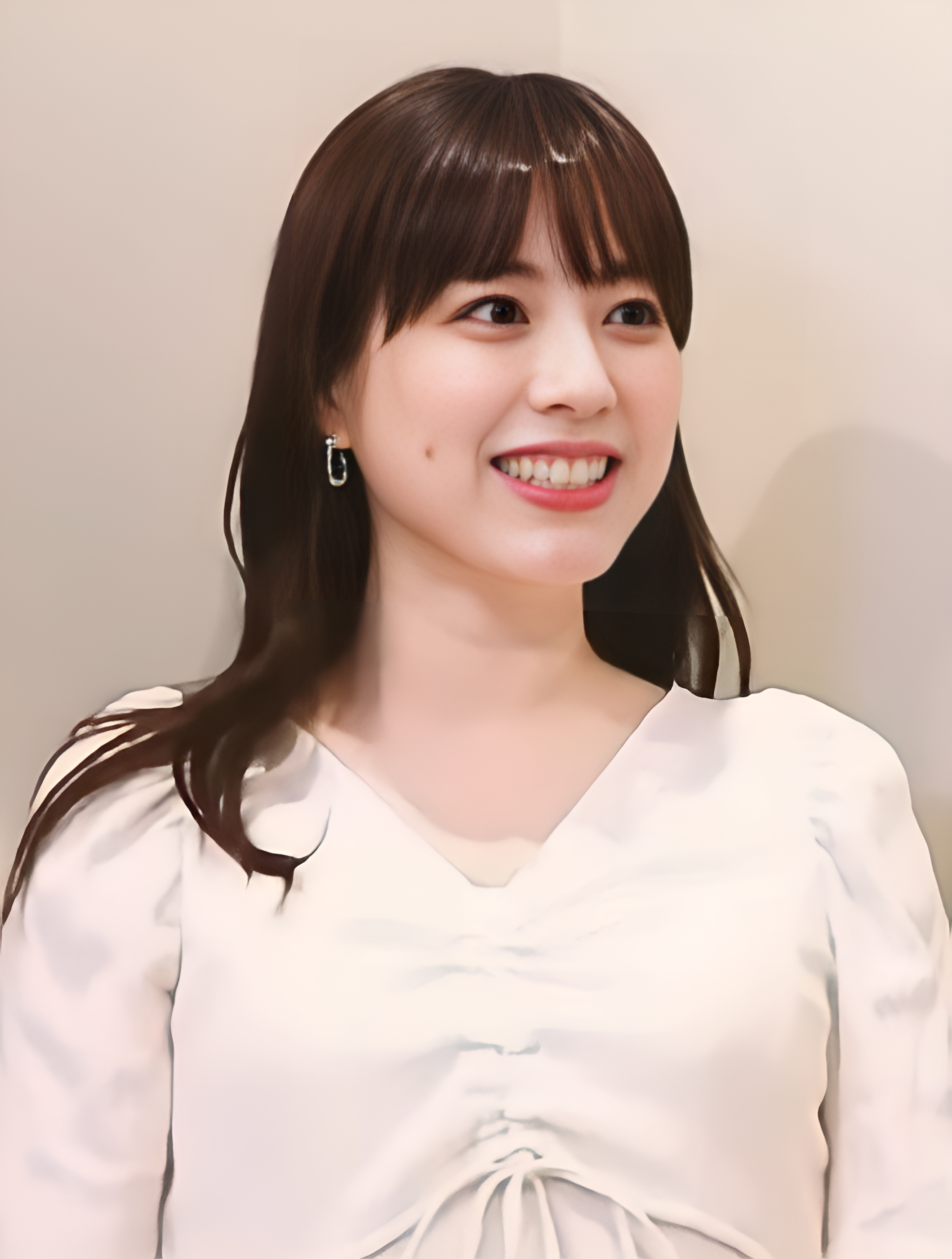
Yumi Sugimoto, the July 2009 model

| Issue | Name | Location | Notes | Ref |
|---|---|---|---|---|
| January | Yuko Takayama | Komatsu Base | | |
| February | Ai Takabe | JMSDF Yokosuka Naval Base | | |
| March | Yoko Kumada | Ministry of Defense headquarters, Ichigaya | | |
| April | Yuri Morishita | Iruma Air Base | | |
| May | Moe Fukuda | Camp Asaka | | |
| June | Atsuko Maeda | JMSDF Tateyama Air Base | | |
| July | Yumi Sugimoto | Fuchū Air Base | | |
| August | Yuki Shimizu | Kasumigaura Air Field | | |
| September | Yuu Tejima | Shimofusa Air Base | | |
| October | Natsuko Tatsumi | Tachikawa Airfield | | |
| November | Kana Tsugihara | Camp Takeyama | | |
| December | Yuzuki Aikawa | National Defense Medical College | | |

== 2010s ==
=== 2010 ===
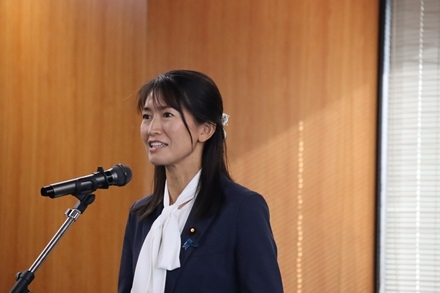
Chisato Morishita, the July 2010 model

| Issue | Name | Location | Notes | Ref |
|---|---|---|---|---|
| January | Yuko Shimizu | JS Hyūga | | |
| February | Yui Koike | Camp Matsudo | | |
| March | Miho Nishida | Ministry of Defense headquarters, Ichigaya | | |
| April | Ai Okawa | Naval Air Facility Atsugi | | |
| May | Aki Kawamura | Camp Nerima | | |
| June | Miyu Uehara | | | |
| July | Chisato Morishita | JMSDF Yokosuka Naval Base | | |
| August | Hanako Motoyama | Camp Omiya | Accompanied by CBRN defense technicians. | |
| September | Natsuko Nagaike | Kurihama, Yokosuka | | |
| October | Hanako Takigawa | Iruma Air Base | | |
| November | Mai Oshima | Camp Katsuta | | |
| December | Aya Kiguchi | Shimofusa Air Base | | |

=== 2011 ===
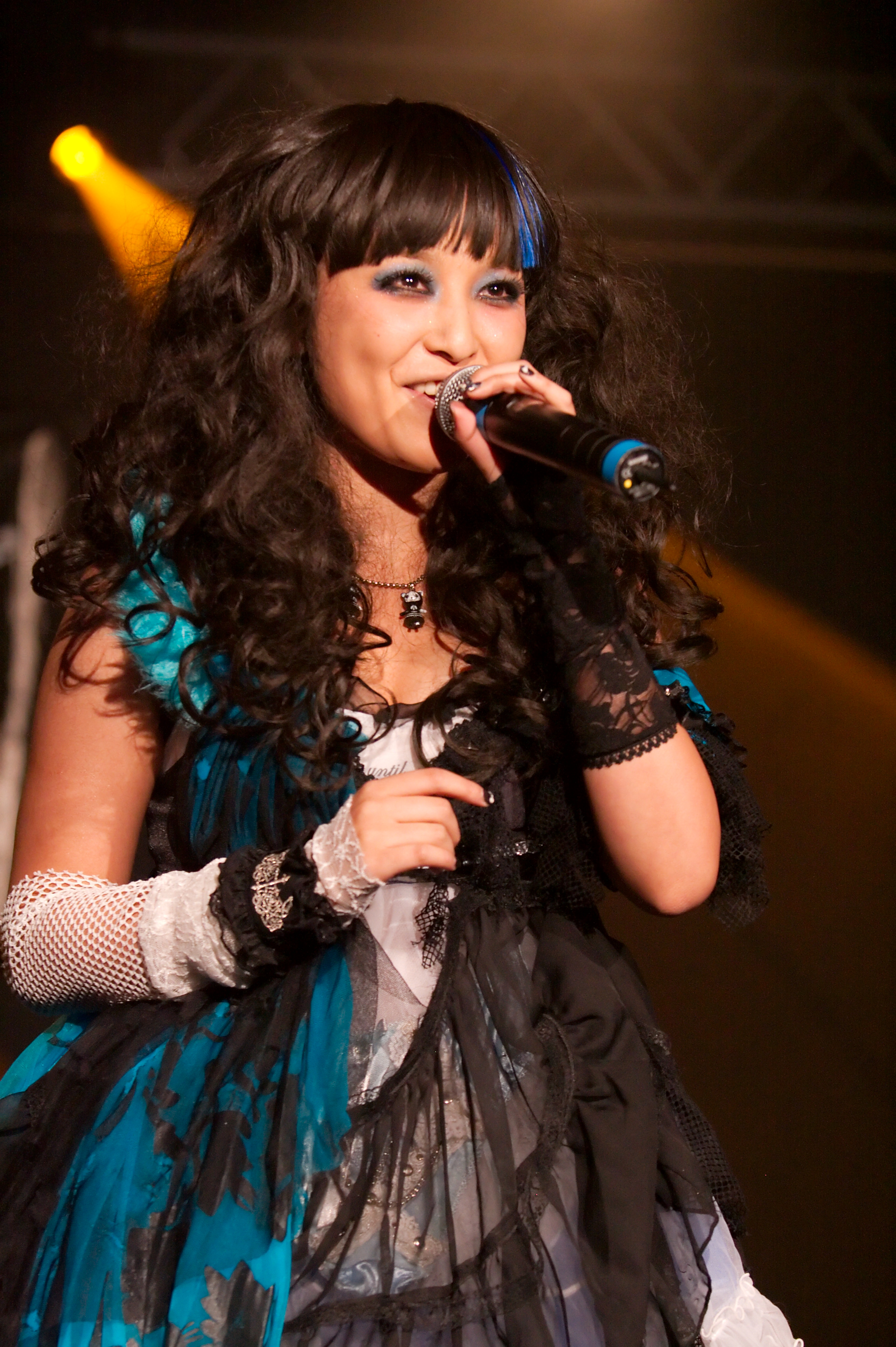
Rika Ishikawa, the March 2011 model

| Issue | Name | Location | Notes | Ref |
|---|---|---|---|---|
| January | Rina Aizawa | Hyakuri Airfield | | |
| February | Shizuka Ōya | Camp Takeyama | | |
| March | Rika Ishikawa | Ministry of Defense headquarters, Ichigaya | | |
| April | None | | No Goddess due to Tōhoku earthquake and tsunami. Cover instead showed JSDF service members in dress uniform. | |
| May | Yuki Watanabe | Kisarazu Air Field | | |
| June | None | | Special cover focusing on the JSDF response to the Tōhoku earthquake and tsunami. | |
| July | Idoling!!! | Ministry of Defense headquarters, Ichigaya | | |
| August | Mayuko Kawakita | Tokushima Air Base | | |
| September | Mai Nishida | Iruma Air Base | | |
| October | Anri Sugihara | Camp Fuji | Photographed on Type 10. | |
| November | JSDF servicewomen in sports | | | |
| December | Akie Suzuki | Ministry of Defense Meguro District | | |

=== 2012 ===
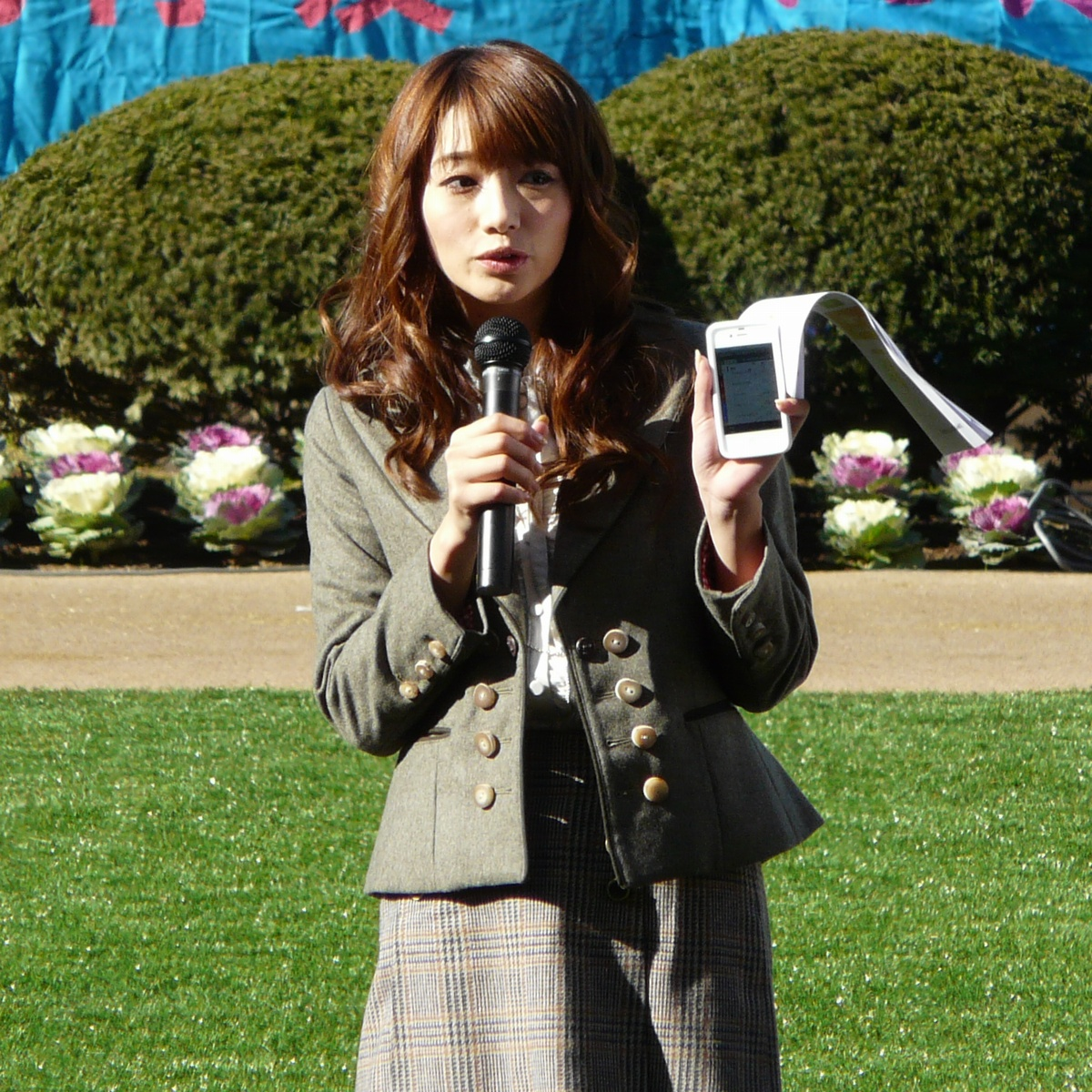
Kaori Manabe, the March 2012 model

| Issue | Name | Location | Notes | Ref |
|---|---|---|---|---|
| January | Saori Nishidate | Camp Asaka | | |
| February | Tao Tsuchiya | Icebreaker Shirase | | |
| March | Kaori Manabe | Ministry of Defense headquarters, Ichigaya | | |
| April | Ayaka Fuchigami | Hyakuri Airfield | Accompanied by Mitsubishi UH-60J and crew. | |
| May | Idoling!!! | Matsushima Air Field | | |
| June | Manami Marutaka | Camp Soumagahara | | |
| July | Makoto Okunaka | JMSDF Tateyama Air Base | | |
| August | Yuko Mizuno | Camp Asaka | | |
| September | Yui Takahashi | JS Hatakaze (DDG-171) | | |
| October | Rio Uchida | National Defense Academy of Japan | | |
| November | Risa Naito | Camp Asaka | | |
| December | Ayaka Komatsu | JS Enoshima (MSC-604) | | |

=== 2013 ===
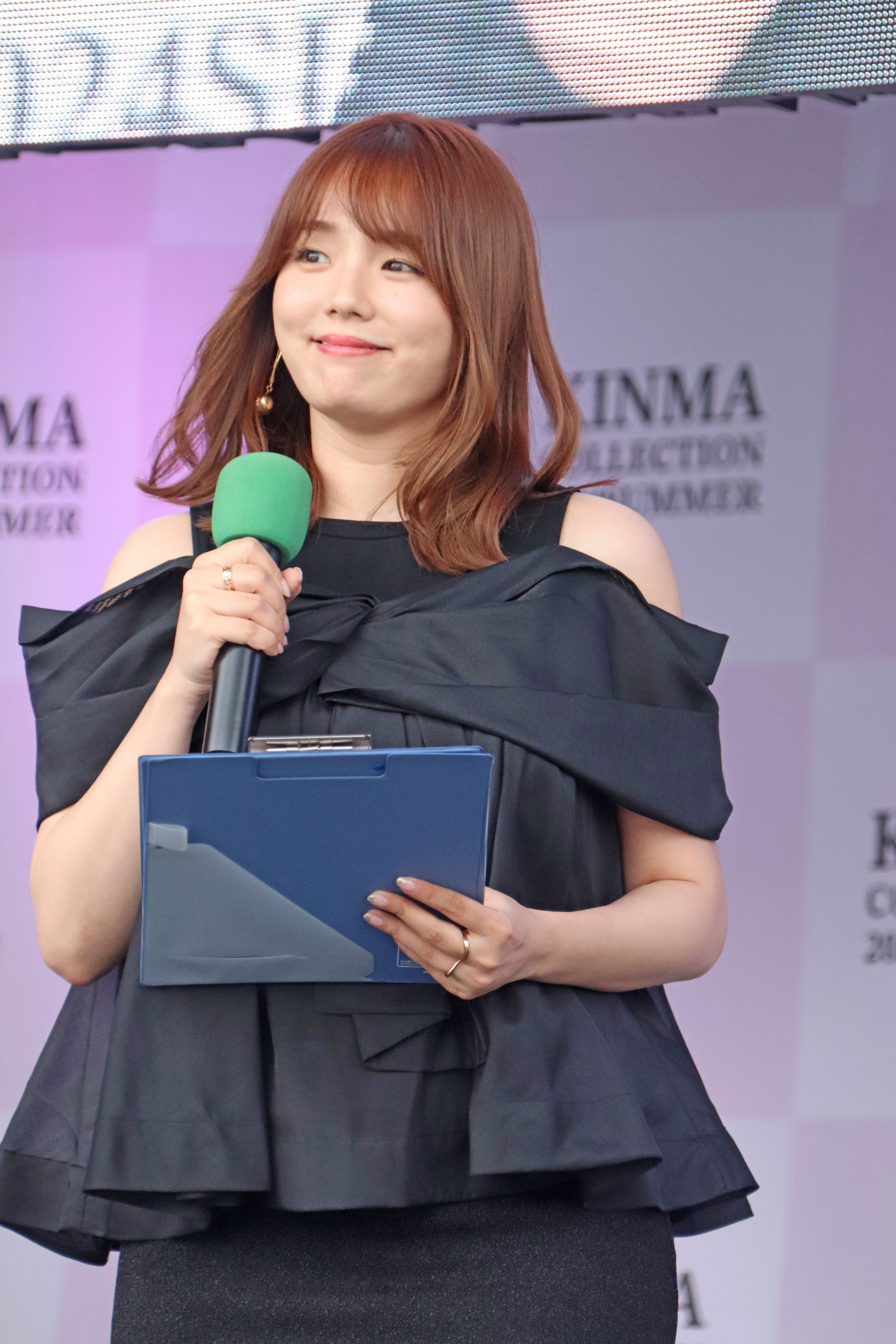
Ai Shinoaki, the August 2013 model

| Issue | Name | Location | Notes | Ref |
|---|---|---|---|---|
| January | Ruriko Kojima | Iruma Air Base | | |
| February | Anna Konno | Camp Matsudo | | |
| March | Rei Okamoto | Ministry of Defense headquarters, Ichigaya | | |
| April | Yui Ito | Hyakuri Airfield | | |
| May | Narumi Konno | Tachikawa Airfield | | |
| June | Azusa Yamamoto | Kisarazu Air Field | | |
| July | Erina Matsui | Camp Narashino | | |
| August | Ai Shinozaki | Camp Youga | Accompanied by members of the Japan Ground Self-Defense Force Music Corps. | |
| September | Rika Adachi | Iruma Air Base | | |
| October | Mai Hakase | Naval Air Facility Atsugi | Photographed with Kawasaki P-1. | |
| November | Risa Yoshiki | JGSDF Camp Misyuku | | |
| December | Mai Fuchigami, Miho Nishizumi from Girls und Panzer | Camp Asaka | Photographed with Type 10 tank. First cover with a fictional character; Fuchigami is the voice actress for Miho. | |

=== 2014 ===
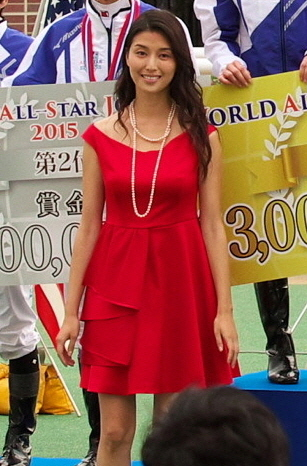
Manami Hashimoto, the September 2014 model

| Issue | Name | Location | Notes | Ref |
|---|---|---|---|---|
| January | Rina Nagai | Hyakuri Airfield | Visited the 305th Tactical Fighter Squadron. | |
| February | Aya Hirano | JS Takanami | | |
| March | Haruka Katayama, Mariya Nagao, and Reina Fujie | Ministry of Defense headquarters, Ichigaya | Members of AKB48. | |
| April | Saaya Irie | Acquisition, Technology & Logistics Agency | | |
| May | Natsuki Katō | JS Oyashio | | |
| June | Shizuka Nakamura | Camp Shimoshizu | | |
| July | Alisa | JS Yamayuki | | |
| August | Nonoka Ono | National Defense Medical College | | |
| September | Manami Hashimoto | Camp Omiya | | |
| October | Mitsu Dan | Iruma Air Base | | |
| November | Haruka Shimazaki | Shimofusa Air Base | | |
| December | Rinko Uema | Kurihama, Yokosuka | | |

=== 2015 ===
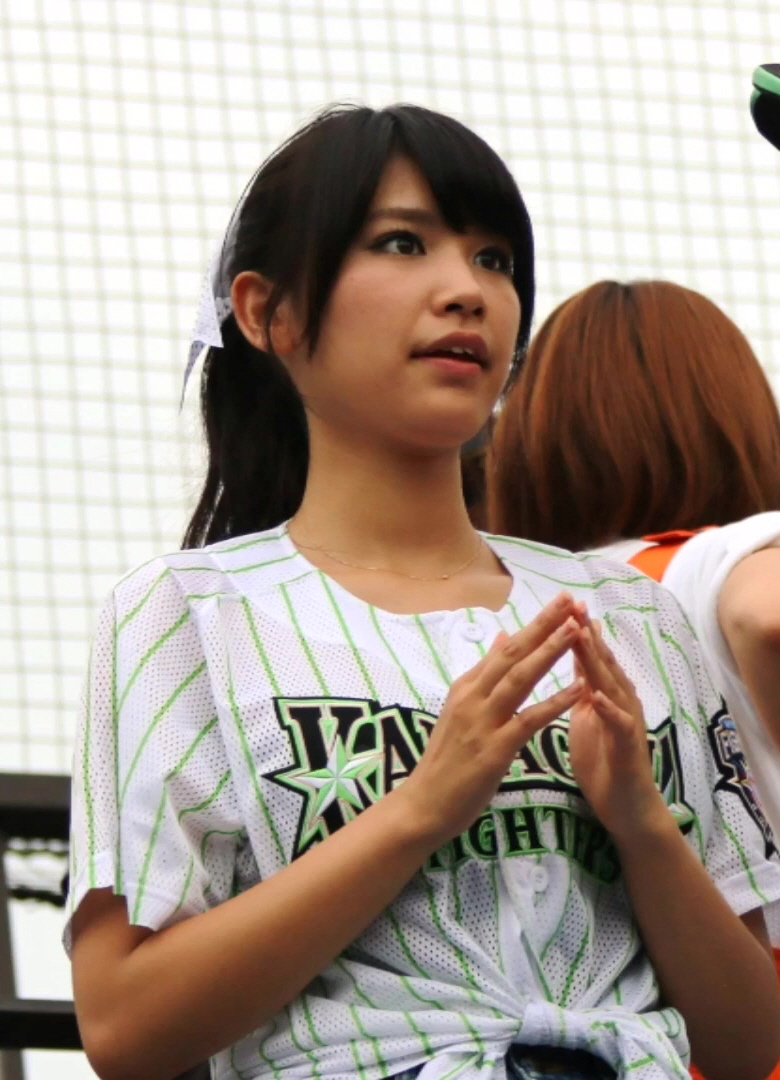
Ikumi Hisamatsu, the December 2015 model

| Issue | Name | Location | Notes | Ref |
|---|---|---|---|---|
| January | Asuka Kishi | JMSDF Yokosuka Naval Base, Taura District | | |
| February | Hinako Kinoshita | Fuchū Air Base | | |
| March | Chinami Suzuki | Ministry of Defense headquarters, Ichigaya | | |
| April | Sayaka Tomaru | Naval Air Facility Atsugi | | |
| May | Karen Miyazaki | Iruma Air Base | | |
| June | Hinako Sano | Ministry of Defense headquarters, Ichigaya | | |
| July | Misaki Komatsu | JMSDF Yokosuka Naval Base | | |
| August | Mari Yamachi | Kumagaya Air Base | | |
| September | Konishi Kiss | Harumi, Tokyo | | |
| October | Mai Asada | Camp Utunomiya | | |
| November | Mizuki Hoshina | Yokota Air Base | | |
| December | Ikumi Hisamatsu | Camp Takeyama | | |

=== 2016 ===
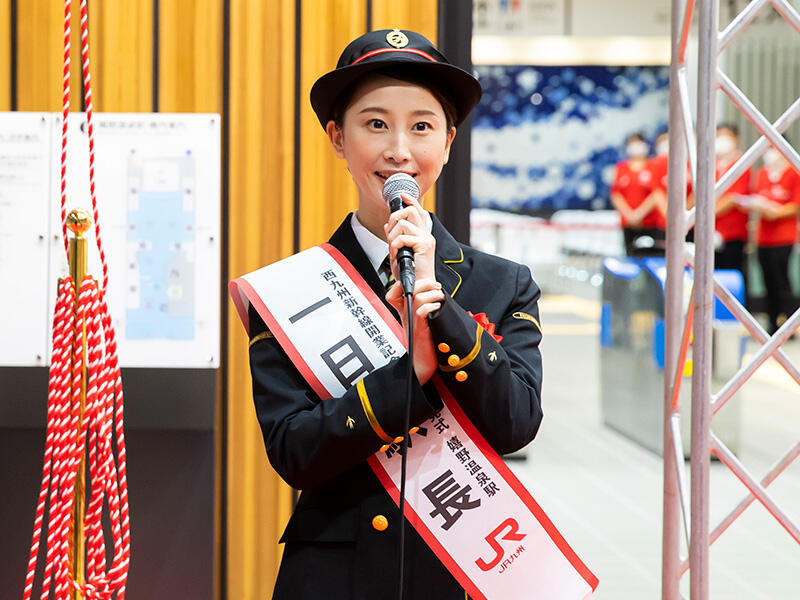
Rena Matsui, the February 2016 model

| Issue | Name | Location | Notes | Ref |
|---|---|---|---|---|
| January | Rina Takeda | JS Izumo | | |
| February | Rena Matsui | Camp Jujo | | |
| March | Yurina Yanagi | Ministry of Defense headquarters, Ichigaya | | |
| April | Chiyo Koma | Camp Takeyama | | |
| May | Ren Ishikawa | Kisarazu Air Field | | |
| June | Aya Asahina | Shimofusa Air Base | | |
| July | Hinako Sakurai | Camp Koga | | |
| August | Miwako Kakei | National Institute for Defense Studies | | |
| September | Fuka Koshiba | JS Kirishima | | |
| October | Miyu Yoshimoto | Camp Zama | | |
| November | RaMu | Iruma Air Base | | |
| December | Saki Suzuki | Camp Asaka | | |

=== 2017 ===
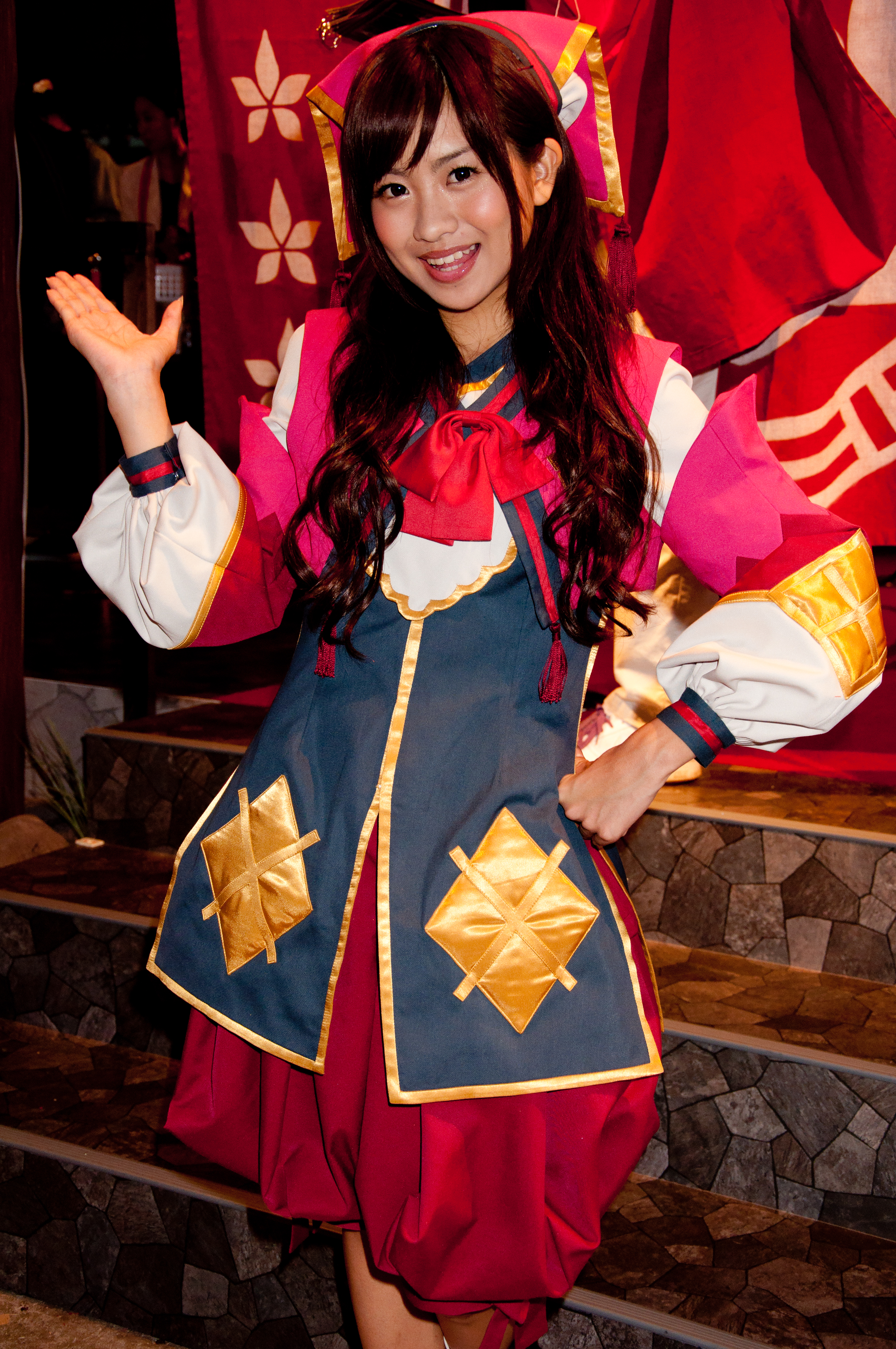
Marie Soda, the August 2017 model

| Issue | Name | Location | Notes | Ref |
|---|---|---|---|---|
| January | Moemi Katayama | Camp Kokura | | |
| February | Iroha Yanagi | Hyakuri Airfield | | |
| March | Ami Inamura | Ministry of Defense headquarters, Ichigaya | | |
| April | Kaho Takashima | Naval Air Facility Atsugi | | |
| May | Yu Saotome | Hamamatsu Air Base | | |
| June | Kanako Hiramatsu | Camp Narashino | | |
| July | Ayana Taketatsu | JS Asuka | | |
| August | Marie Soda | Iruma Air Base | | |
| September | Aya Kawasaki | Ministry of Defense headquarters, Ichigaya | | |
| October | Honoka | JMSDF Tateyama Air Base | | |
| November | Mei Okada | Iruma Air Base | | |
| December | Anna Hongo | Kasumigaura Air Field | | |

=== 2018 ===
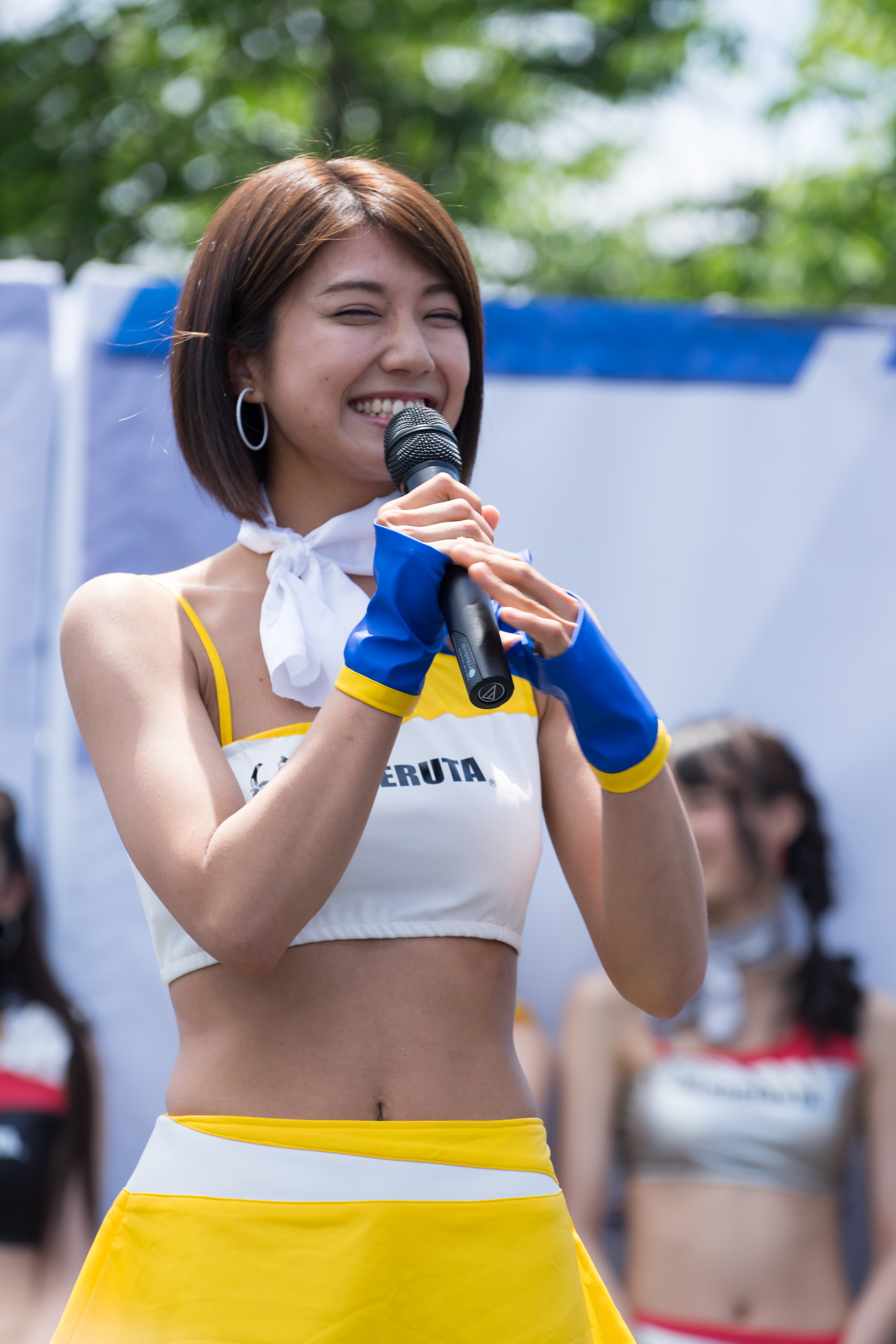
Yuki Fujiki, the April 2018 model

| Issue | Name | Location | Notes | Ref |
|---|---|---|---|---|
| January | Akari Saitō | JS Uraga | | |
| February | Akane Sagara | Iruma Air Base | | |
| March | Michiko Tanaka | Ministry of Defense headquarters, Ichigaya | | |
| April | Yuki Fujiki | Camp Nerima | | |
| May | Mai Watanabe | JMSDF Yokosuka Naval Base | Visited the Tadodai House. | |
| June | Reimi Osawa | Hyakuri Airfield | | |
| July | Jurina Matsui | Camp Asaka | | |
| August | Yurina Kumai | JMSDF Yokosuka Naval Base | | |
| September | Shieri Ohata | Kumagaya Air Base | | |
| October | Ruka Matsuda | Camp Asaka | | |
| November | Yako Koga | JMSDF Yokosuka Naval Base | | |
| December | Hitomi Korenaga | Shizuhama Air Base | | |

=== 2019 ===
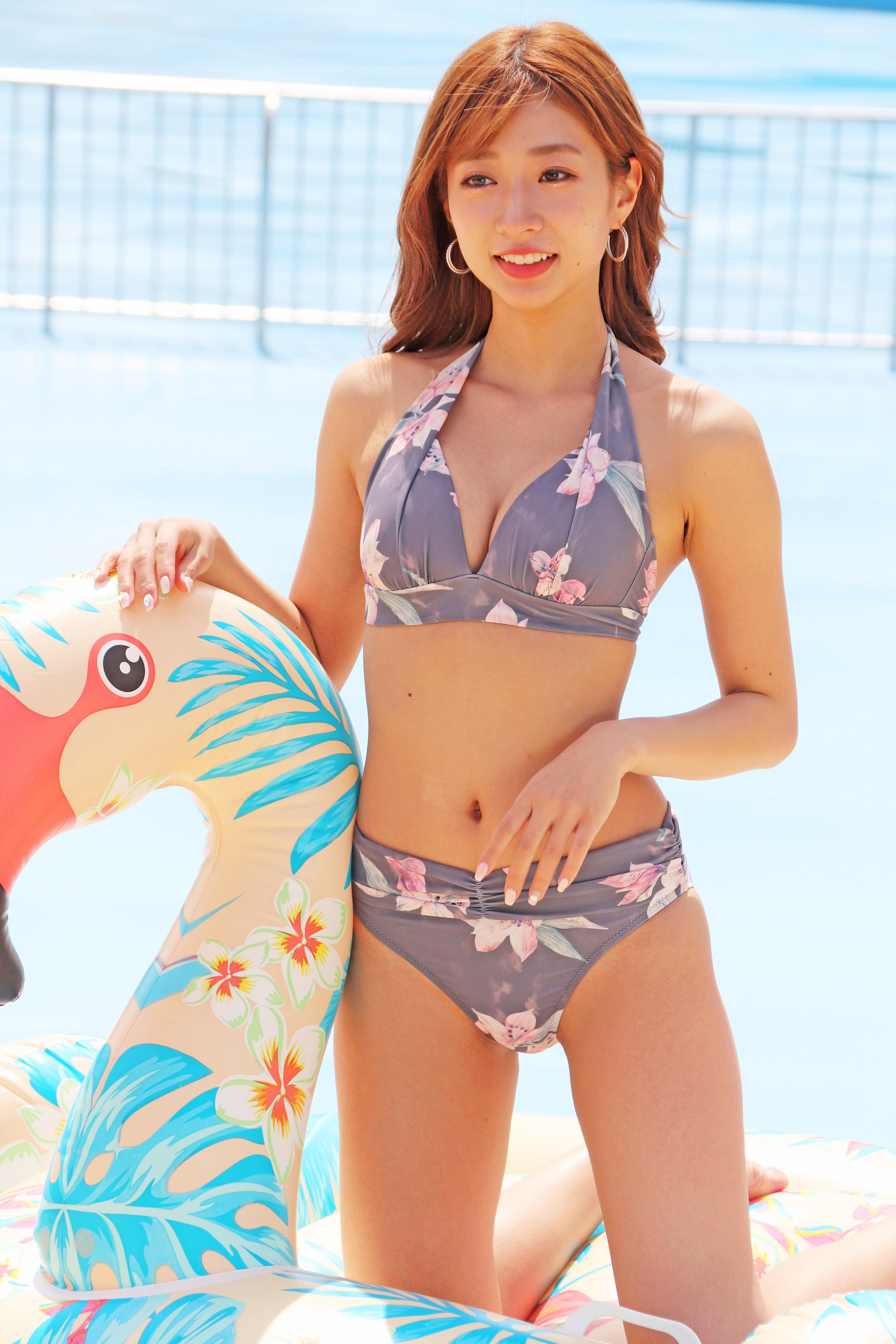
Sayaka Ōnuki, the September 2019 model

| Issue | Name | Location | Notes | Ref |
|---|---|---|---|---|
| January | Arisa Komiya | Sagami General Depot | | |
| February | Eagle and Gripen from Girly Air Force | Komatsu Base | First illustrated cover. Issue focused on the then-upcoming anime. All 30 thousand copies were sold, making it the best-selling Mamor issue. | |
| March | Sae Okazaki | Iruma Air Base | | |
| April | Mayu Hasegawa | Ministry of Defense headquarters, Ichigaya | | |
| May | Asuka Hanamura | JSDF Central Hospital, Mishuku | | |
| June | Kiwa | JS Takanami | | |
| July | Kanna Moriya | Iruma Air Base | | |
| August | Nana Asakawa | Camp Kodaira | | |
| September | Sayaka Ōnuki | JS Chichijima (MSC-605) | | |
| October | Momoka Ishida | Ministry of Defense headquarters, Ichigaya | | |
| November | Ami Maeshima | Fuchū Air Base | | |
| December | Maimi Yajima | JS Izumo | | |

== 2020s ==
=== 2020 ===
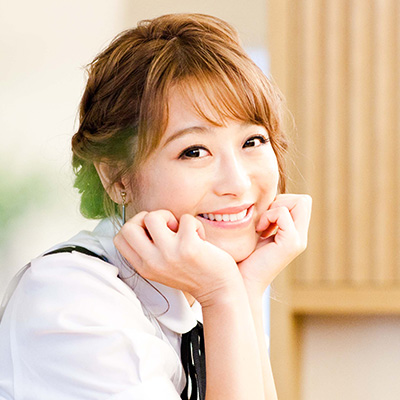
Nana Suzuki, the March 2020 model

| Issue | Name | Location | Notes | Ref |
|---|---|---|---|---|
| January | Yume Hayashi | Hyakuri Airfield | | |
| February | Mai Watanabe | Ministry of Defense headquarters, Ichigaya | | |
| March | Nana Suzuki | Ministry of Defense headquarters, Ichigaya | Cover's background is an illustration of Earth from outer space to cover the Japan Air Self-Defense Force's space warfare capabilities. | |
| April | Mei Fukuda | JMSDF Yokosuka Naval Base | | |
| May | Yuki Mizuhara | Camp Youga | | |
| June | Barbie and Kanako Murakami | National Defense Academy of Japan | | |
| July | Akina Minami | Shimofusa Air Base | | |
| August | Akari Kitō | Tachikawa Airfield | | |
| September | Akari Suda | Ministry of Defense headquarters, Ichigaya | | |
| October | Miki Nishino | Ministry of Defense headquarters, Ichigaya | | |
| November | Mariya Nagao | Iruma Air Base | | |
| December | Miki Sato | JMSDF Yokosuka Naval Base | | |

=== 2021 ===
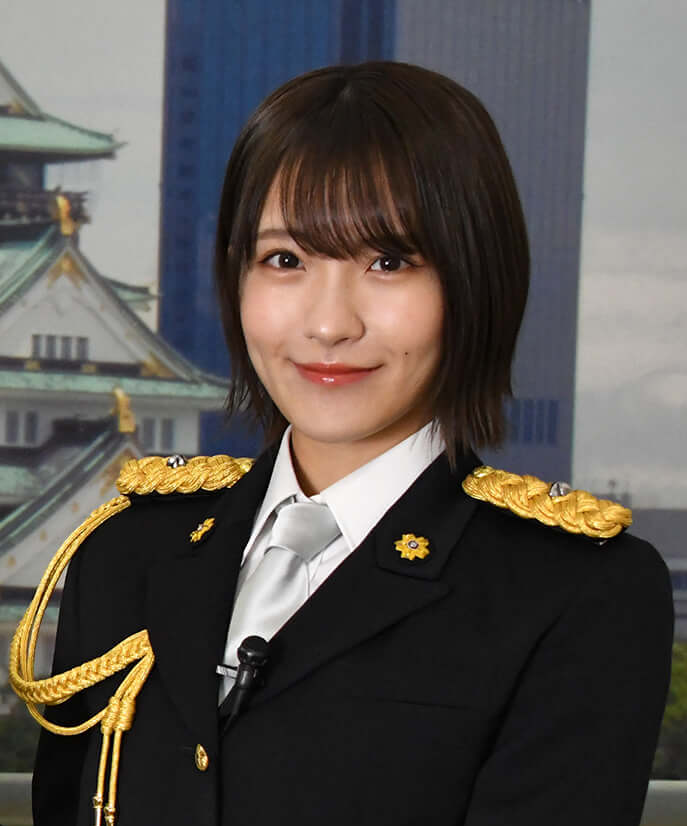
Karin Kojima, the December 2021 model

| Issue | Name | Location | Notes | Ref |
|---|---|---|---|---|
| January | Misaki Jinbu | Ministry of Defense Meguro District | | |
| February | Haruka Dan | Camp Shimoshizu | | |
| March | Mio Kudo | Utsunomiya Air Field | | |
| April | Eri Oishi | National Defense Medical College | | |
| May | Natsumi Hashiba | Iruma Air Base | | |
| June | Reina Kurosaki | Hyakuri Airfield | | |
| July | Rina Koike | JMSDF Yokosuka Naval Base | Visited the 2nd Maritime Service School. | |
| August | Natsuki Kawamura | Camp Soumagahara | Accompanied by two special reconnaissance motorcycle riders. | |
| September | Momoko Tanabe | Hyakuri Airfield | | |
| October | Azusa Ohara | JMSDF Yokosuka Naval Base | | |
| November | Kuriemi | Camp Katsuta | | |
| December | Karin Kojima | JS Yamagiri | | |

=== 2022 ===
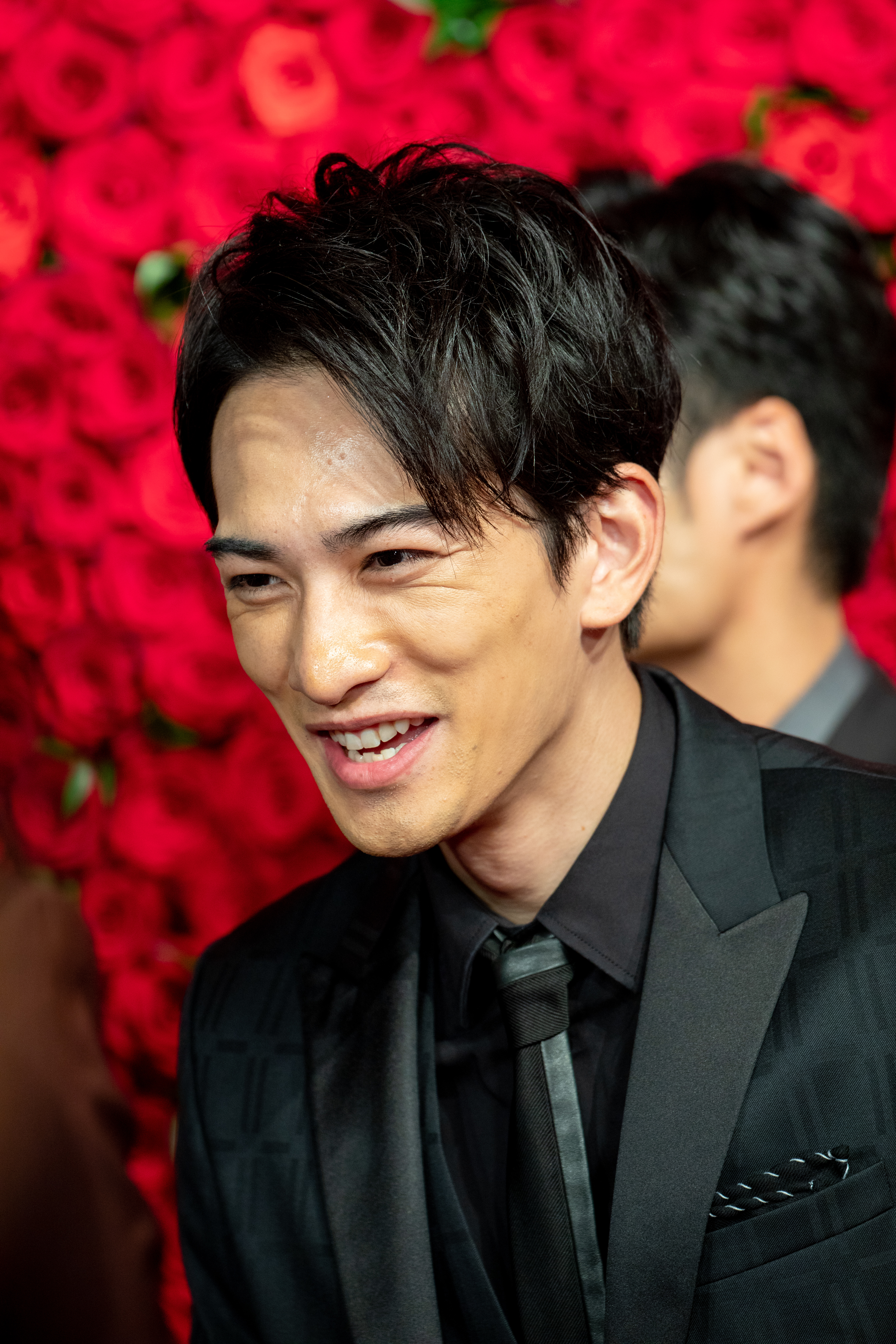
Keita Machida, one of the rare male figures to appear on the cover

| Issue | Name | Location | Notes | Ref |
|---|---|---|---|---|
| January | Akari Yoshida | JGSDF Camp Itazuma | | |
| February | Tomu Muto | Hyakuri Airfield | Photographed with anti-aircraft systems. | |
| March | Nene Shida | Ministry of Defense headquarters, Ichigaya | Cover is a collage of Shida wearing the dress uniform of each branch. | |
| April | Rio Uchida | JS Teruzuki | | |
| May | Yume Shinjo, Nadeshiko Kagamihara from Laid-Back Camp | Camp Asaka | | |
| June | Tomoka Kurotani | Iruma Air Base | Visited the Aeromedical Research Unit. | |
| July | Haruna Iikubo | Kisarazu Air Field | Photographed with Bell Boeing V-22 Osprey. | |
| August | Nao Minamisawa | Hyakuri Airfield | | |
| September | Mai Shiraishi | | Centerfolds about their roles in the television series Teppaichi!. Machida is one of the few male figures to appear on the cover. | |
| October | Keita Machida | | Centerfolds about their roles in the television series Teppaichi!. Machida is one of the few male figures to appear on the cover. | |
| November | Karin Miyamoto | JS Taigei | | |
| December | Seiran Kobayashi | JGSDF High Technical Schooil | | |

=== 2023 ===
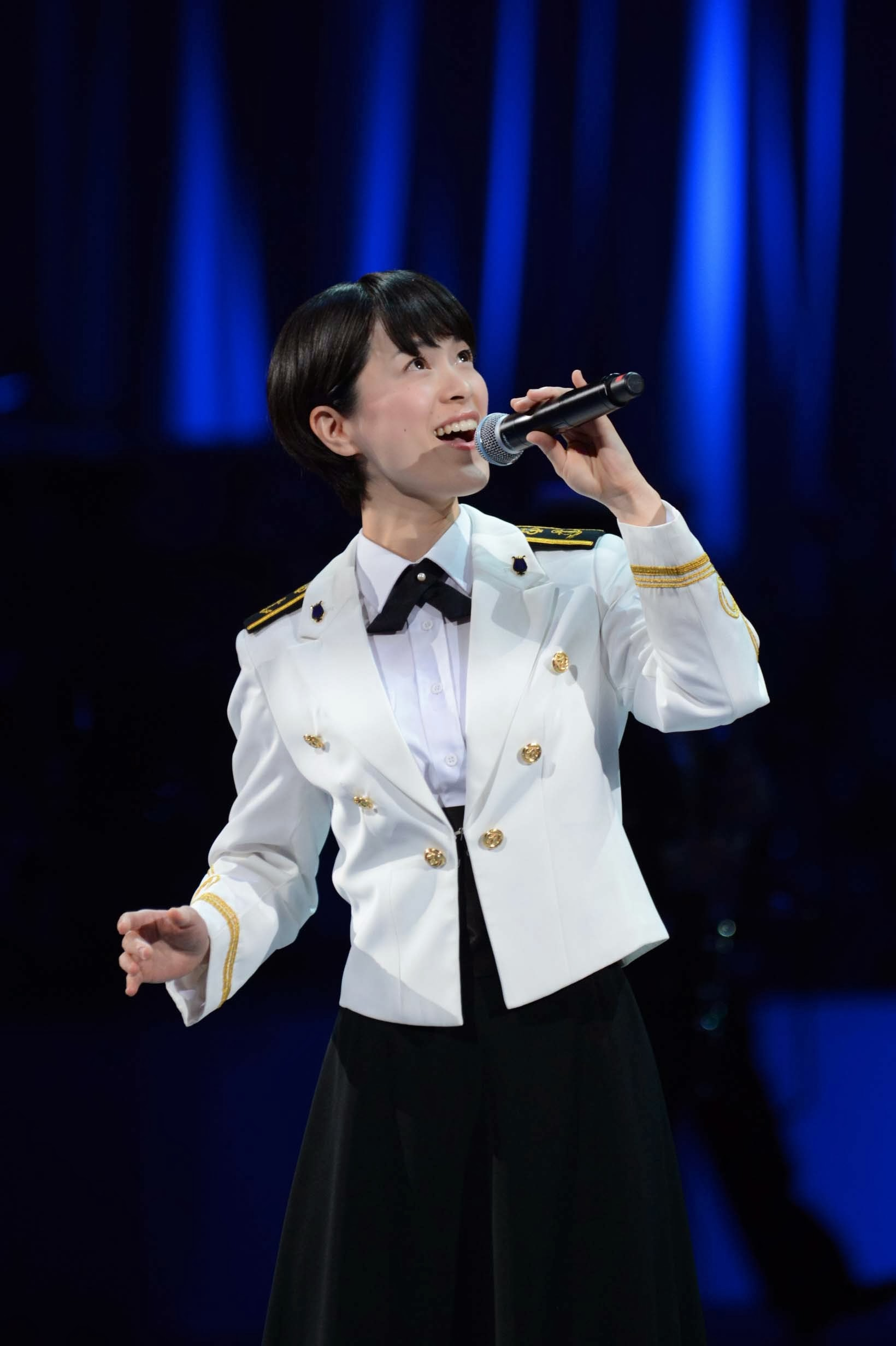
Yukari Miyake of the Tokyo SDF Band, who shared the August 2023 cover

| Issue | Name | Location | Notes | Ref |
|---|---|---|---|---|
| January | Miki Nanri | Kumagaya Air Base | | |
| February | Cocoro Toyoshima | JMSDF Tateyama Air Base | Visited the 21st Fleet Air Squadron. | |
| March | Miyo Hirai | JS Ōnami | | |
| April | Midori Nagatsuki | Hyakuri Airfield | Visited the Air Rescue Wing Hyakuri Detachment. | |
| May | Akana Ikeda | Iruma Air Base | Visited the 2nd Tactical Airlift Group. | |
| June | Ayano Kawamura | Camp Nerima | Photographed with CBRN equipment from the 1st Nuclear Biological Chemical Weapon Defense Unit. | |
| July | Momoka Goshima | Shimofusa Air Base | Visited the 203rd Air Training Squadron of the Air Training Group Simofusa. | |
| August | Mai Tsugumi, Yukari Miyake, and Saki Morita | | Members of the Japan Ground Self-Defense Force Central Band. | |
| September | Ryoko Kobayashi | JS Hashidate | | |
| October | Yuzuha Saeki | Camp Tsuchiura | 200th issue of Mamor. | |
| November | Daisuke Watanabe | JS Seiryū | Captain of the Seiryū. | |
| December | Omaneko | | Mascot of the Omaezaki Sub Base. | |

=== 2024 ===
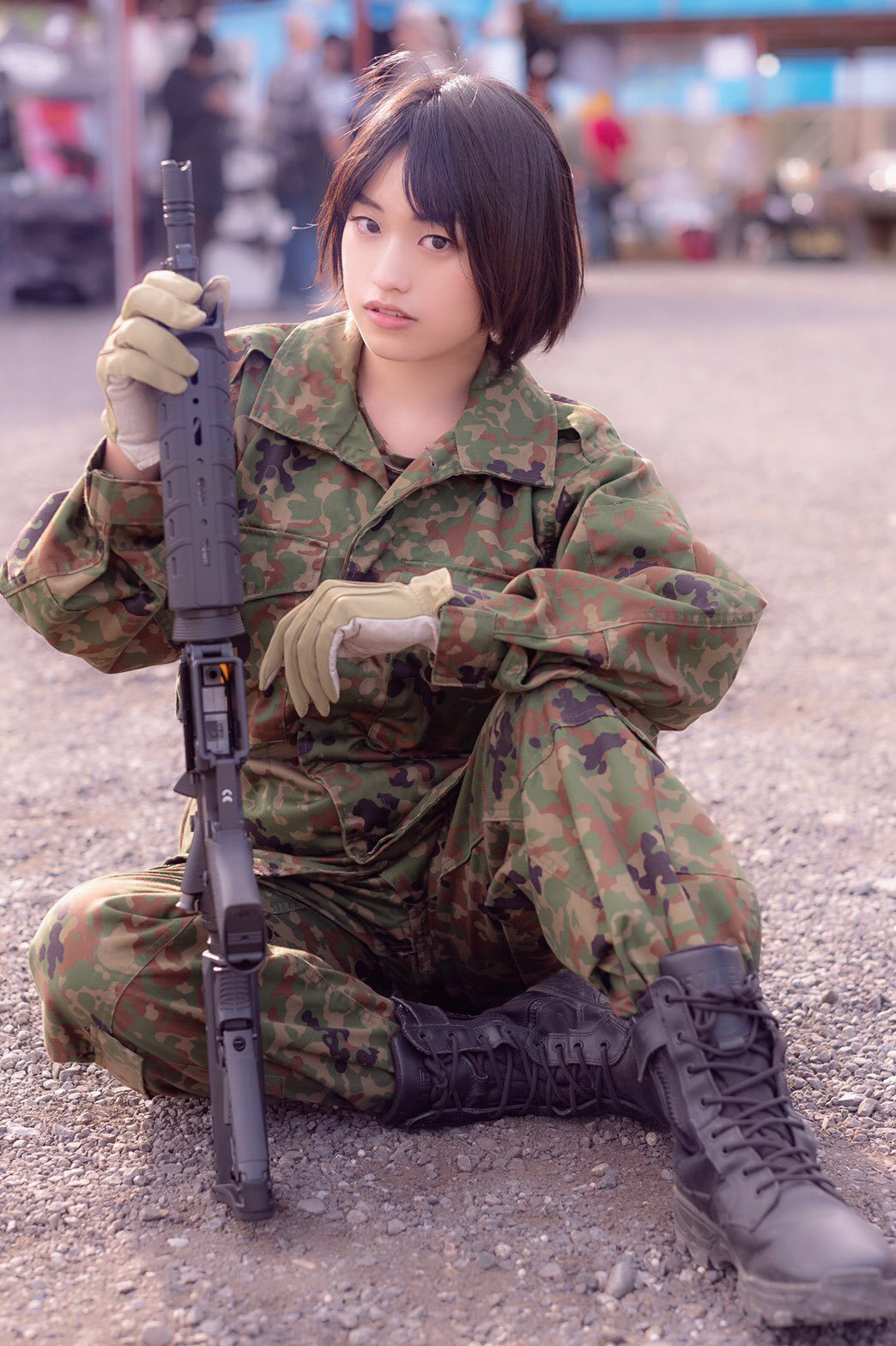
Kazari, the April 2024 model and a JSDF veteran

| Issue | Name | Location | Notes | Ref |
|---|---|---|---|---|
| January | Nene Shida | Ministry of Defense headquarters, Ichigaya | Became a public relations advisor for the Ministry of Defense in 2023. | |
| February | Rina Onuki | Iruma Air Base | | |
| March | Arisa Sonohara | Tachikawa Airfield | | |
| April | Kazari | Ōtemachi | JSDF veteran who was the subject of a feature story in the May 2021 issue. | |
| May | Rin Kawana | Utsunomiya Air Field | | |
| June | Yūka Nihei | Ministry of Defense Meguro District | | |
| July | Kanami Takasaki | Hyakuri Airfield | Photographed with Mitsubishi F-2. | |
| August | Iori Sagara | Camp Narashino | | |
| September | Ayaka Imoto | Naval Air Facility Atsugi | Photographed with Kawasaki P-1. | |
| October | Shiori Tamada | Camp Matsudo | | |
| November | Nashiko Momotsuki | National Defense Academy of Japan | | |
| December | Kazuhiko Nishimura | Tokushima Air Base | | |

=== 2025 ===
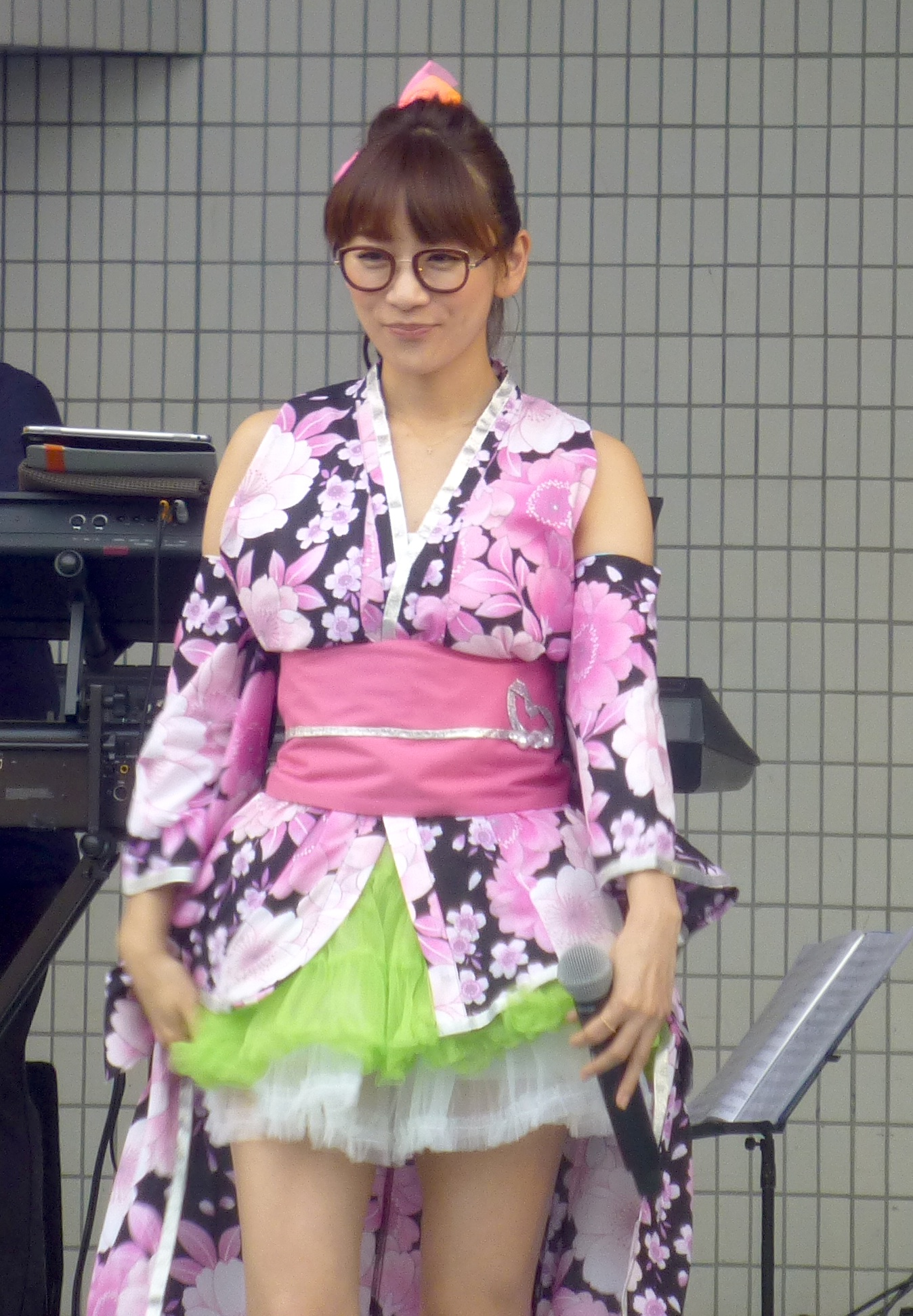
Ami Tokito, the March 2025 Goddess of the Defender

| Issue | Name | Location | Notes | Ref |
|---|---|---|---|---|
| January | Ai Tenshō | None | Cover is of Tenshō surrounded by framed photos of servicemen and their families. | |
| February | Omaneko and Hamu Chunchun | None | Fictional characters. | |
| March | Ami Tokito | Kisarazu Air Field | | |
| April | Ayano Sumida | Camp Nerima | | |
| May | Ina Enohara | JS Kumano | | |
| June | Rio Teramoto | Kumagaya Air Base | | |
| July | Hongo Yuzuha | JMSDF Yokosuka Naval Base | | |
| August | Chippy-chans | Ministry of Defense headquarters, Ichigaya | | |
| September | Hiroshi Tamaki | None | Cover to promote the film Yukikaze. | |
| October | Yuina Enomoto | Camp Kodaira | | |
| November | Kisumi Amau | Iruma Air Base | Visited the Central Air Command Support Squadron. | |
| December | Yukiho Shimoitani | Ministry of Defense headquarters, Ichigaya | | |

=== 2026 ===
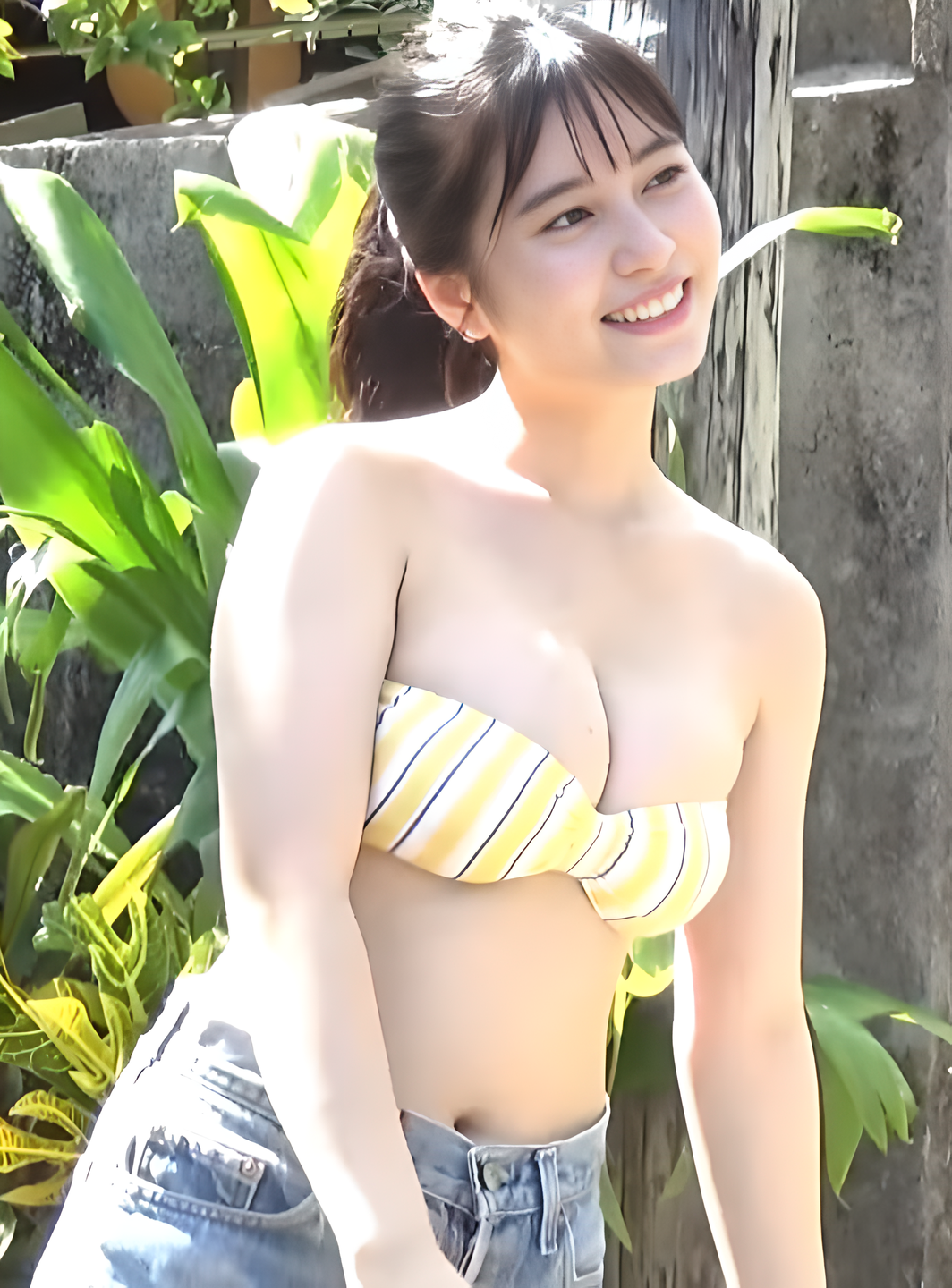
Sakurako Okubo, the March 2026 model

| Issue | Name | Location | Notes | Ref |
|---|---|---|---|---|
| January | Sora Kurashima | Kurihama, Yokosuka | Visited the Systems Communications and Cyber School. | |
| February | Yūka Kikuchi | Camp Nerima | Visited the 1st Infantry Regiment, 1st Division. | |
| March | Sakurako Okubo | JSDF Central Hospital | | |
| April | Himeka Araya | Hyakuri Airfield | | |
| May | Sana Hoshimori | JS Ikazuchi (DD-107) | | |
| June | None | | Illustrated cover of a saluting serviceman to promote the issue's feature story about helping 59 JSDF officers find romance. | |
| July | Hana Takeuchi | Camp Asaka | Visited the JSDF Physical Training School. | |
| August | None | | Special cover discussing Obon festivals on JSDF bases. | |
| September | Moeka Sasaki | Shizuhama Air Base | Visited the 11th Flight Training Wing. | |
| October | Ririka Fukui | Iruma Air Base | | |
| November | Miri Ichika | Kisarazu Air Field | | |
| December | Nana Nanase | Camp Asaka | | |

=== 2027 ===
| Issue | Name | Location | Notes | Ref |
|---|---|---|---|---|
| January | Hideharu Suzuki | Ministry of Defense headquarters, Ichigaya | First to be called a "Hero of the Defenders". | |
