= Kashiwa (disambiguation) =

Kashiwa may refer to:

- Kashiwa, a city in the prefecture Chiba, Japan
- Kashiwa, Aomori
- Bin Kashiwa (born 1944)
- Hank Kashiwa (born 1949)
- Jeff Kashiwa (born 1963)
- Shiro Kashiwa (1912–1998)
- Yoshifumi Kashiwa (born 1987)
- Yukina Kashiwa (born 1994)
- Kashiwa Airfield
- Kashiwa Angel Cross
- Kashiwa Hitachi Stadium
- Kashiwa Kinen
- Kashiwa Reisoru
- Kashiwa Station
- Kashiwa Yukina
- Kashiwa mochi
