= Shimofusa Air Base =

JMSD Shimohusa Air Base 下総航空基地
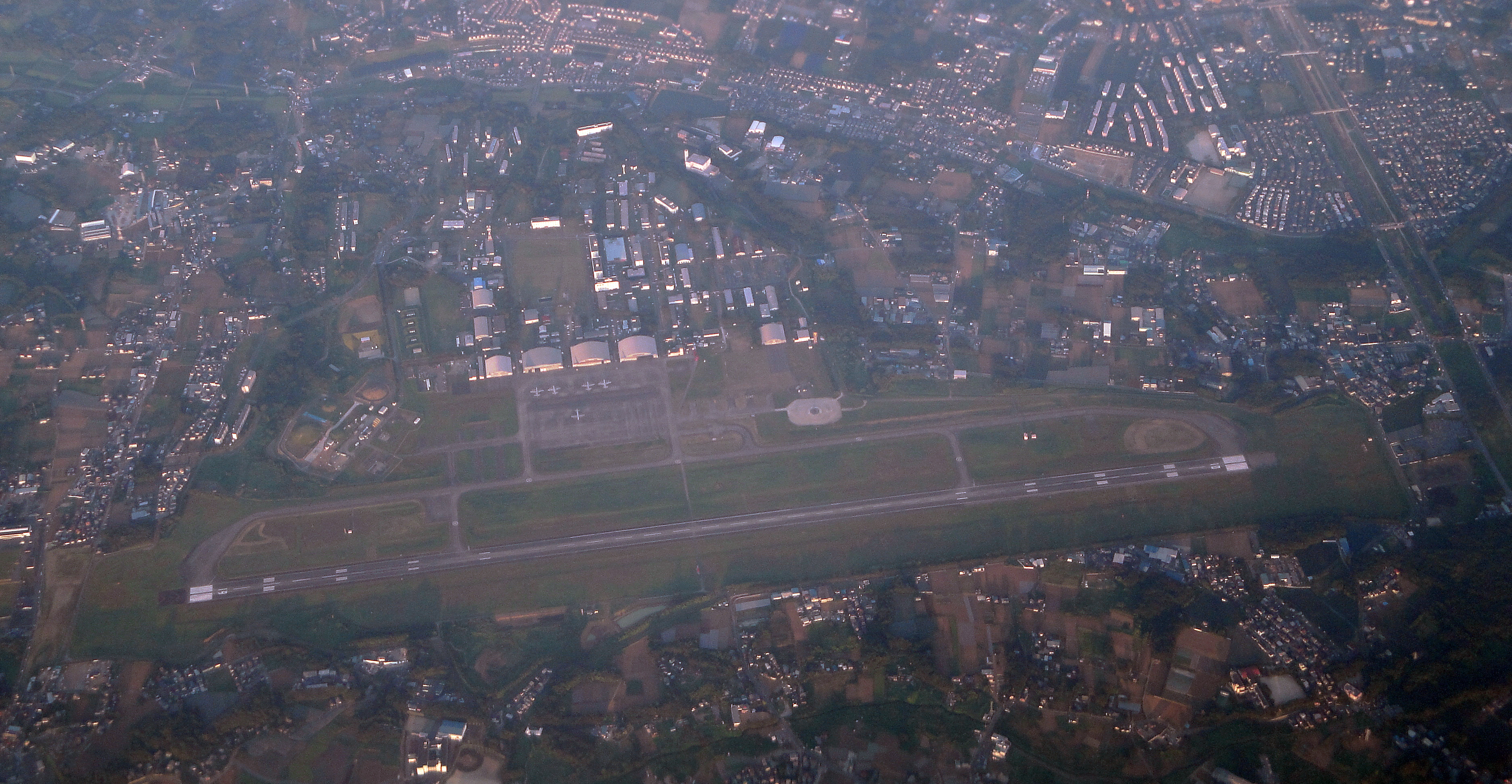
- IATA: none; ICAO: RJTL

Summary
- Airport type: Military
- Operator: Japan Maritime Self-Defense Force
- Location: Kashiwa, Chiba, Japan
- Elevation AMSL: 98 ft / 30 m
- Coordinates: 35°47′56″N 140°00′44″E

Map
- Location in Japan

Runways
| Direction | Length | | Surface |
| Direction | m | ft | Surface |
|---|---|---|---|
| 01/19 | 2,250 | 7,382 | Concrete |
- Source: Japanese AIP at AIS Japan

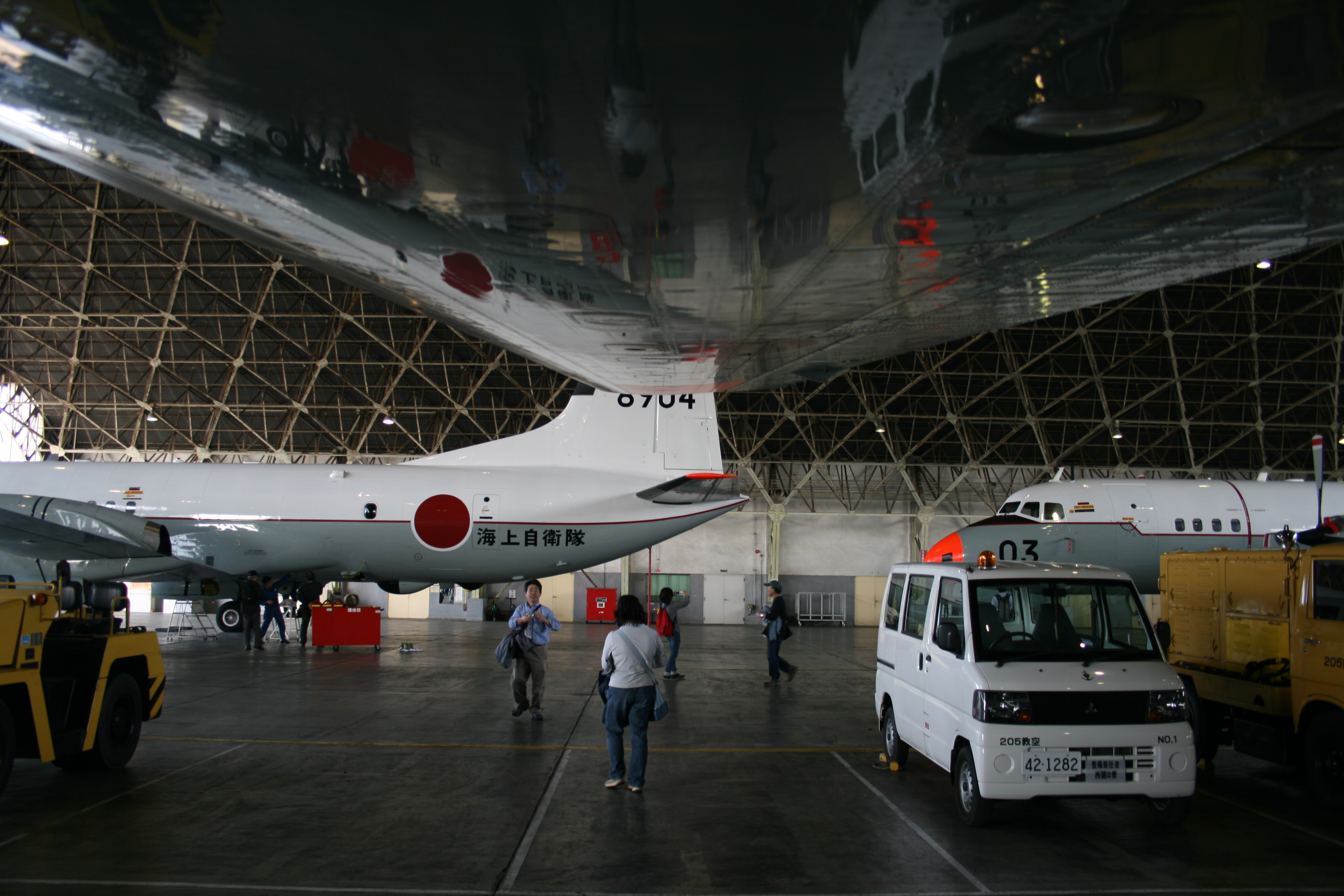
Hangar inspection 2009

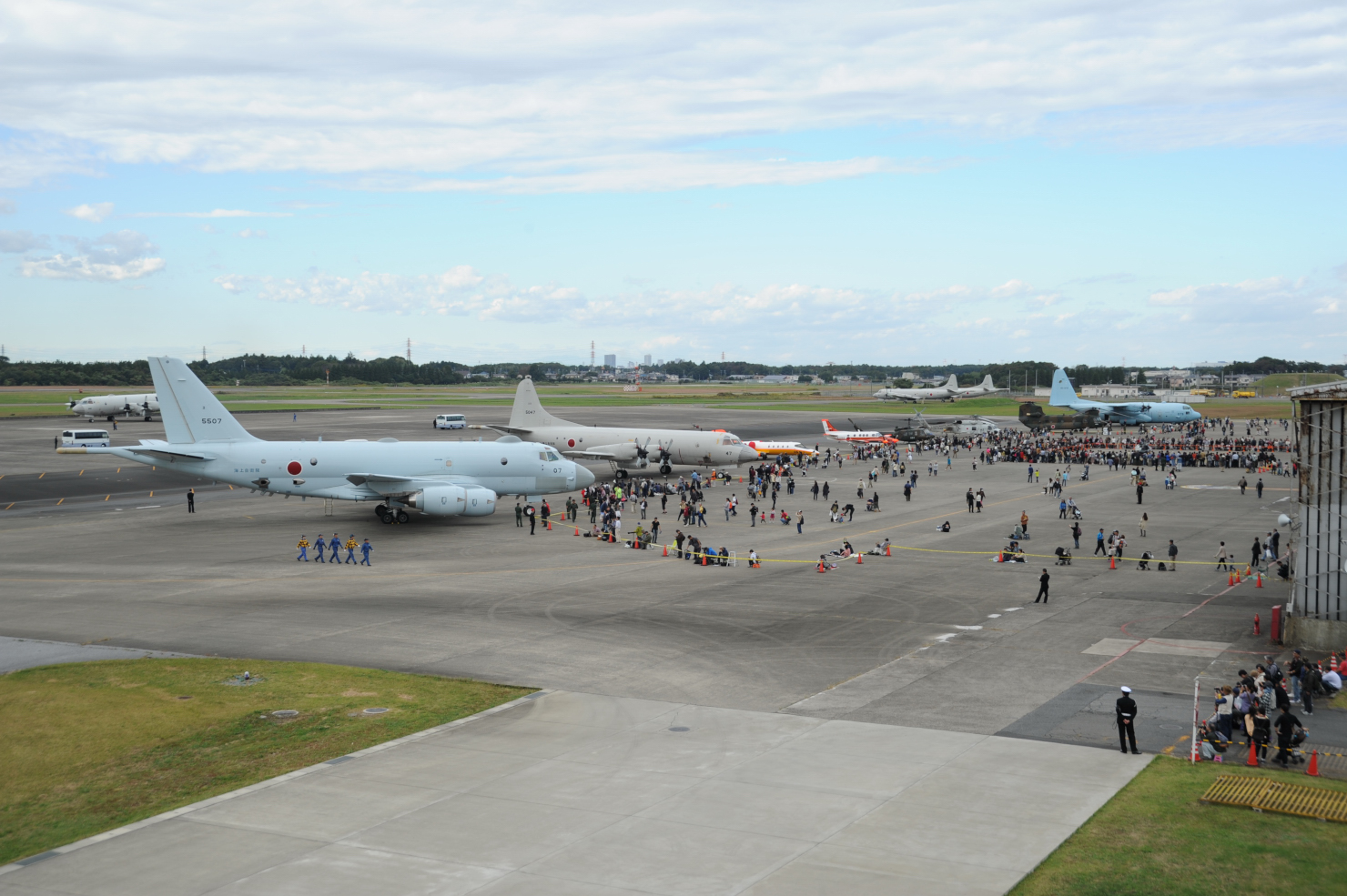
Shimofusa Air Base festival 2016

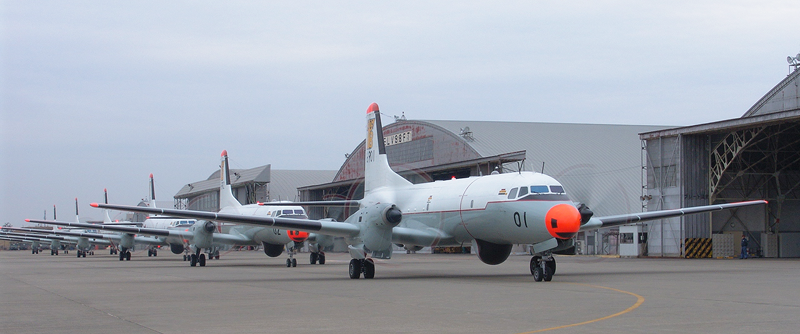
YS-11 T-A

Shimofusa Air Base (下総航空基地, Shimohusa Kōkū Kichi) (ICAO: RJTL), officially Shimohusa Air Base, is a military aerodrome of the Japan Maritime Self-Defense Force. It is located 5.4 NM (10.0 km; 6.2 mi) east of Matsudo in Chiba Prefecture, Japan. The base straddles the border between Kashiwa and Kamagaya cities.

== Operations ==
Shimofusa Air Base is currently the headquarters of the JMSDF Simohusa Air Training Group, which is equipped with Kawasaki-Lockheed P-3C Orion maritime patrol aircraft and NAMC YS-11 training aircraft. It is also host to the JMSDF 3rd Service School and a detachment from the JMSDF Communications Command.

== History ==
=== Origins ===
Shimofusa Air Base was initially founded as Fujigaya Airfield (藤ヶ谷飛行場, Fujigaya Hikōjō) for the IJAAF in 1945 during the closing stages of World War II by appropriating the Musashi Country Club Fujigaya Course which was once the premier golf course in the Tokyo area. With the completion of the airfield facility in April 1945, the 116th Airfield Battalion was assigned to Fujigaya to become the base host unit. At that time, the deployment of major IJAAF units in Tokatsu Region of Chiba Prefecture were:

- Fujigaya Airfield, Fujigaya, Kazahaya Village, Higashi-Katsushika District
  - 116th Airfield Battalion
- Matsudo Airfield, Gokō-Mutsumi, Matsudo City
  - 53rd Air Combat Group (Ki-45 Kai)
  - 6th Airfield Battalion
- Kashiwa Airfield, Toyofuta, Tanaka Village, Higashi-Katsushika District
  - 70th Air Combat Group (Ki-44)
  - Rear Echelon, 18th Air Combat Group (Ki-61, Ki-100)
  - Tokuheitai (Ki-200 test and evaluation unit) (Ku-13, Ki-51)
  - 3rd Airfield Battalion

In June 1945, the advanced echelon of the 18th Air Combat Group withdrew from the Philippines by heavy attrition in the Battle of Luzon. Immediately upon arrival in Japan, they joined with the rear echelon which consisted of 36 aircrews and 46 Ki-100s, and on 19 June 1945 the group reassigned to Matsudo Airfield for air defense missions over the Kanto Plain area. Consequently, the 53rd Air Combat Group was reassigned from Matsudo to Fujigaya and performed air defense missions until the end of the war.

=== U.S. military use ===
After the surrender of Japan, Fujigaya Airfield was occupied by approximately 300 troops of the Eighth U.S. Army on 27 September 1945. On 30 October, an artillery battery of the 112th Cavalry Regimental Combat Team which was seizing Kashiwa Airfield was sent elements in to relieve the occupation troops at Fujigaya. By the end of the year, the airfield was placed under the control of Fifth Air Force and was redesignated as Shiroi Air Base, after the nearby town of Shiroi. Since then, the base was utilized as an auxiliary airfield and alternate Air Defense Control Center. There are two off-base/detached installations operated by USAF in support of Shiroi; aircraft control and warning radar site at Mineokayama Liaison Annex, and HF radio communications transmitter station at Funabashi Communication Site.

=== Japan Self Defense Force use ===
In 1959, joint use agreement between USAF and Japan Maritime Self Defense Force was established at Shiroi, and JMSDF ground service crew training unit activated in place. As a result, all USAF assets left Shiroi on 12 December 1959. The base was completely returned to the Government of Japan in June 1960, then redesignated as JMSDF Shimohusa Air Base.

Afterward, the JMSDF Fleet Air Force Headquarters activated at Shimofusa, then the base became an important facility for anti-submarine patrol aircraft's operations in Japan. In 1962, the runway and control tower were rebuilt, and the JMSDF Fleet Air Wing 4 was activated. With the partial release of U.S. Naval Air Station Atsugi in 1973, Headquarters JMSDF Fleet Air Force and the Fleet Air Wing 4 was relocated to Atsugi, and primary purpose of the base was reduced as a training facility. As the result, the JMSDF Air Training Command was relocated from JMSDF Utsunomiya Air Base (present, JGSDF Camp Kita-Utsunomiya) to Shimofusa. In addition, the JMSDF Helicopter Rescue Squadron has been stationed at Shimofusa from 1993.

== Units ==
=== Imperial Japanese Army Air Service ===
- 53rd Air Combat Group, June－August 1945 (Ki-45 Kai)
- 116th Airfield Battalion, April－August 1945

=== U.S. Air Force ===
Wings

- 456th Troop Carrier Wing (Medium), 10 November 1955－6 June 1956
- 6920th Security Wing, USAFSS, unknown－1 November 1958

Groups

- 524th Aircraft Control and Warning Group
- 528th Aircraft Control and Warning Group
- 597th Aircraft Control and Warning Group
- 6002d Air Intelligence Service Group
- 6902d Special Communications Group

Squadrons

- 611th Aircraft Control and Warning Squadron
- 620th Aircraft Control and Warning Squadron, c. 1 August 1946－15 March 1955
- 621st Aircraft Control and Warning Squadron, 21 July 1948－3 June 1949
- 711th Air Transport Squadron
- 744th Troop Carrier Squadron (Medium), 10 November 1955－6 June 1956 (C-119)
- 745th Troop Carrier Squadron (Medium), 10 November 1955－6 June 1956 (C-119)
- 746th Troop Carrier Squadron (Medium), 10 November 1955－17 May 1956 (C-119)
- 6004th Air Intelligence Service Squadron
- 6020th Air Base Squadron
- 6924th Radio Squadron (Mobile)
- 6926th Radio Squadron (Mobile)

Detachments

- Det. 4, Headquarters, Far East Air Forces
- Det. 10, 1st Air Postal Squadron
- Det. C, District Ofiice No. 6, AFOSI

Others

- 6030th USAF Infirmary (later, Dispensary)

=== Japan Maritime Self Defense Force ===
- Shiroi Service Training Unit, 21 October 1959
  Redesignated: 3rd Service School, 1 February 1961－present

Fleet Air Force

- Headquarters, Fleet Air Force, 1 September 1961－25 December 1973
- Fleet Air Wing 4, 1 September 1962－25 December 1973
  - 3rd Squadron (Patrol), 1 September 1962－25 December 1973 (P2V-7, P-2J, S-2F)
  - 14th Squadron (Patrol), 6 May 1963－25 December 1973 (P2V-7, P-2J, S-2F)
- 51st Squadron (Test and Evaluation), 15 March 1963－October 1981 (P2V-7, P-2J, HSS-2)
- 111th Squadron (Minesweeping), 1 February 1974－1 September 1989 (KV-107II-3)
- Shimohusa Rescue Squadron, May 1965－c. 25 December 1973 (S-62J)

Air Training Command

- Headquarters, Air Training Command, 20 February 1973－present
- Shimohusa Air Training Group, 16 February 1974－present
  - 201st Support and Maintenance Squadron, 16 February 1974
    Redesignated: 203rd Support and Maintenance Squadron, 24 March 1997
    Redesignated: 203rd Maintenance and Supply Squadron, 8 December 1998－present
  - 205th Air Training Squadron, 16 February 1974－1 June 2011 (YS-11T)
  - 206th Air Training Squadron, 1 December 1987 (P-3C)
    Redesignated: 203rd Air Training Squadron, 24 March 1997－present (P-3C)
  - Shimohusa Rescue Squadron, 27 September 1993－26 March 2008 (UH-60J)
  - Shimohusa Air Station Squadron, 16 February 1974－present

Communications Command (HQ: JMSDF Ichigaya Area)

- Mobile Communications Squadron, March 1968－present
- Det. Shimohusa, Yokosuka Communications Squadron, March 2003－present

Criminal Investigation Command (HQ: JMSDF Yokosuka Base)

- Det. Shimohusa, Yokosuka District JMSDF CIC, May 1962－present
