= Yokosuka Thermal Power Station =

Thermal power station in Kanagawa Prefecture in Japan

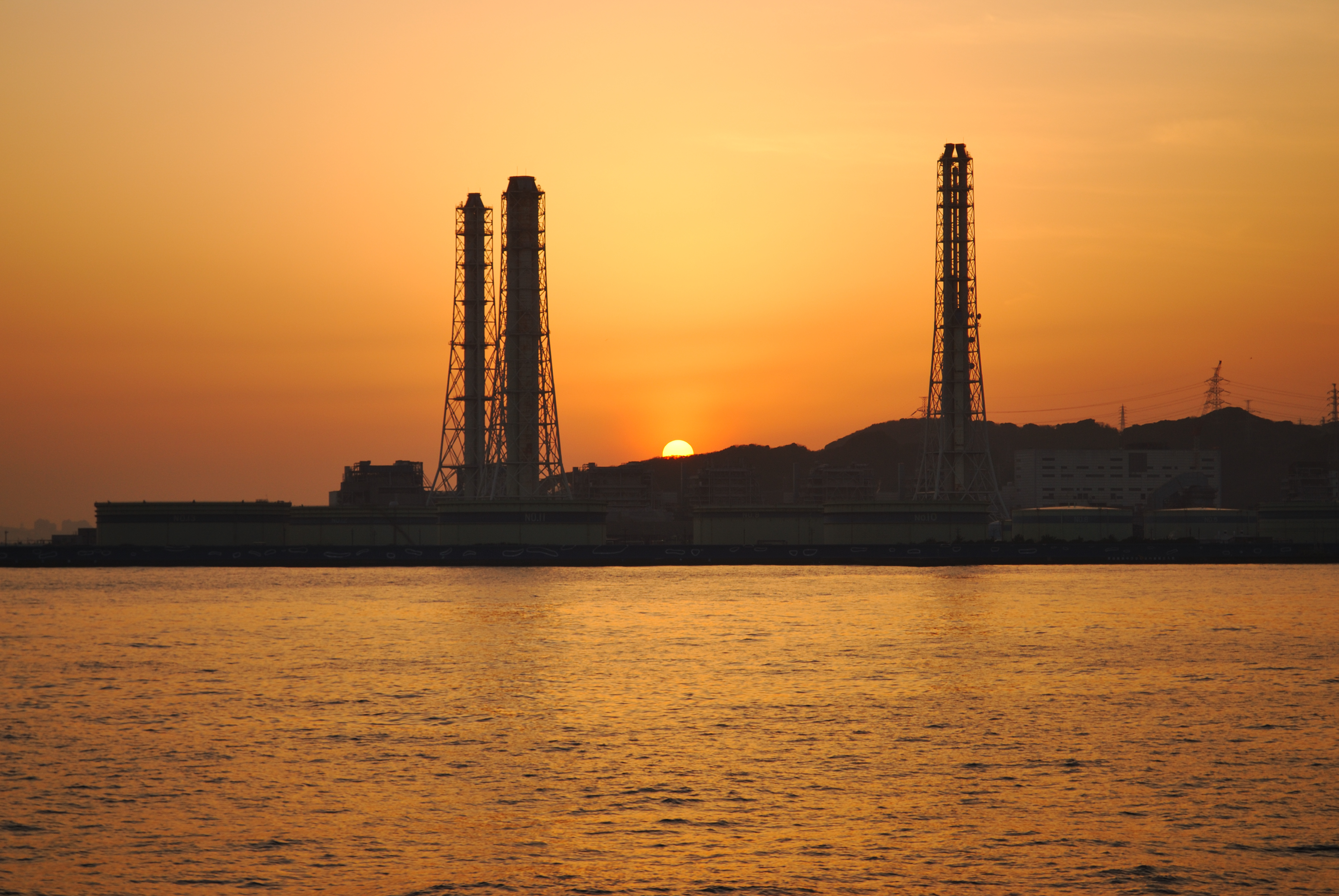
- Country: Japan
- Location: Yokosuka, Kanagawa
- Coordinates: 35°12′56″N 139°42′59″E
- Status: Operational
- Construction began: 2019
- Commission date: 2023
- Owner: Tepco
- Operator: JERA

Thermal power station
- Primary fuel: Coal

Power generation
- Units operational: 2 x 650 MW
- Nameplate capacity: 1.3 GW

External links
- Commons: Related media on Commons

Yokosuka Thermal Power Station (横須賀火力発電所, Yokosuka Karyoku Hatsudensho) is a large thermal power station operated by JERA (50:50 joint-venture between Tokyo Electric Power Company and Chubu Electric Power). It is located near the Kurihama port, at the southern tip of Miura Peninsula, in Kanagawa Prefecture in Japan.

== History ==
Plans to build a power station in Yokosuka were drawn up in 1957, and a site was prepared next to Kurihama Port by filling in part of the bay. The first unit with a 265 MW General Electric turbine went online in October 1960. 8 units were constructed by 1970, with a total power generating capacity of 2630 MW to serve the cities of Kanagawa Prefecture and the Tokyo Metropolis.

An additional gas turbine Unit 1 burning light oil was opened on an experimental basis in July 1971, followed by Gas Turbine Unit 2 (burning natural gas) in July 1993. However, plans were made to close the facility by the mid-2000s due to rising fuel and maintenance costs. Unit 1 was closed in December 2004, followed by Unit 2 and Units 5-8 in March 2006. All remaining units were closed by April 2010.

=== 2011 Restart ===
In order to meet the expected shortage of electrical energy from the aftermath of the 2011 Tōhoku earthquake and tsunami and Fukushima Daiichi nuclear disaster, Tokyo Electric began reactivating mothballed portions of the plant. Gas Turbine Unit 2 was restarted on 28 April, Gas Turbine Unit 1 on 2 June, Unit 3 on 19 June and Unit 4 on 6 July 2011 for a total generating capacity was 874 MW.

Tokyo Electric planned to replace all existing equipment at the Yokosuka Thermal Power Plant with 13 new gas turbine units with a total rated capacity of 3296 MW within 2011.

=== Coal power project ===
In September 2016, JERA proposed replacing the existing Yokosuka thermal power plant with two modern and efficient coal-fired generating units. The JERA Power Yokosuka special-purpose company was established in March 2017. In November 2018, the Ministry of Economy, Trade and Industry (METI) approved the final environmental impact assessment (EIS) for a 1.3 GW coal-fired power project. In May 2019, a group of residents of Yokosuka sued the Japanese government for approving an allegedly simplified EIS report in the Tokyo District Court. The lawsuit failed to stop the construction of the power plant.

Construction of the first 650 MW unit started in August 2019 and commercial operation began in June 2023. In December 2023, JERA announced that it had started commercial operations from the No. 2 coal-fired power unit. The announcement was criticised by climate activists and investors over JERA's continued use of fossil fuel powered plants. JERA defended its power plants by saying that both units use ultra-supercritical (USC) power generating systems that more efficient that older coal-fired power plants and it will continue to modernise its power plants.

== Generating Units ==
Unit Name	Rated Capacity	Generator	Fuel	Operational Range
Unit 1 (scrapped)	265 MW	General Electric		October 1960 – December 2004
Unit 2 (scrapped)	265 MW	Toshiba		September 1962 – March 2006
Unit 3 (operational)	350 MW	General Electric	Heavy crude oil, Crude oil	May 1964 – April 2010; 19 June 2011 – March 2014
Unit 4 (operational)	350 MW	Toshiba	Heavy crude oil, Crude oil	July 1964 – March 2006; 6 July 2011 – March 2014
Unit 5 (mothballed)	350 MW	Toshiba	Heavy crude oil, Crude oil	July 1966 – April 2010
Unit 6 (mothballed)	350 MW	Toshiba	Heavy crude oil, Crude oil	January 1967 – April 2010
Unit 7 (mothballed)	350 MW	Toshiba	Heavy crude oil, Crude oil	September 1969 – April 2010
Unit 8 (mothballed)	350 MW	Toshiba	Heavy crude oil, Crude oil	January 1970 – April 2010
Gas Turbine 1 (operational)	30 MW	Toshiba	Diesel fuel	July 1971 – April 2010; 2 June 2011 – March 2014
Gas Turbine Unit 2 (operational)	144 MW	Toshiba	Light oil, Natural gas	July 1993 – April 2010; 28 April 2011 – March 2014
No. 1 Coal Power Plant	650 MW	Mitsubishi Electric	Coal	June 2023 –
No. 2 Coal Power Plant	650 MW	Mitsubishi Electric	Coal	December 2023 –

== See also ==
- Energy in Japan
- List of power stations in Japan
