= Kurihama, Yokosuka =

Kurihama 久里浜
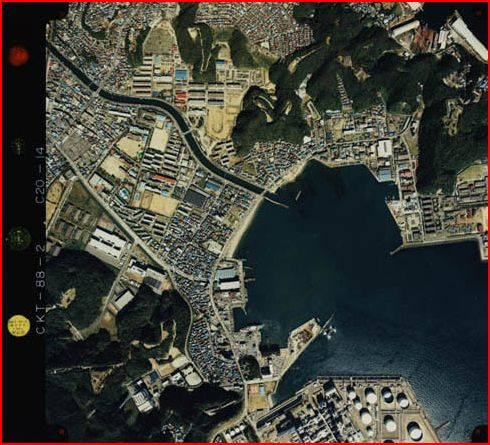
- Interactive map of Kurihama
- Coordinates: 35°13′35.8″N 139°42′21.6″E
- Country: Japan
- Prefecture: Kanagawa Prefecture
- City: Yokosuka City

Area
  - Total: 10.414 km^{2} (4.021 sq mi)

Population (2014)
  - Total: 53,782
  - Density: 5,164.4/km^{2} (13,376/sq mi)
- Time zone: UTC+9 (JST)
- Postal code: 239-0831（久里浜）
- Area code: 046
- Website: 久里浜観光協会公式ウェブサイト (Japanese)
- Coordinates are for Kurihama Administration Centre (久里浜行政センター). This infobox was translated from the Japanese Wikipedia article for Kurihama. Photograph provided by the Ministry of Land, Infrastructure, Transport and Tourism, Japan.

Kurihama (久里浜) is an area in the city of Yokosuka in Kanagawa Prefecture, Japan.

Kurihama is the location where Matthew C. Perry landed for his first negotiations for the opening of Japan on July 14, 1853. A large monument was erected in 1901 to commemorate the event, and a small museum was opened in 1987.

The Yokosuka Thermal Power Station is located at Kurihama.

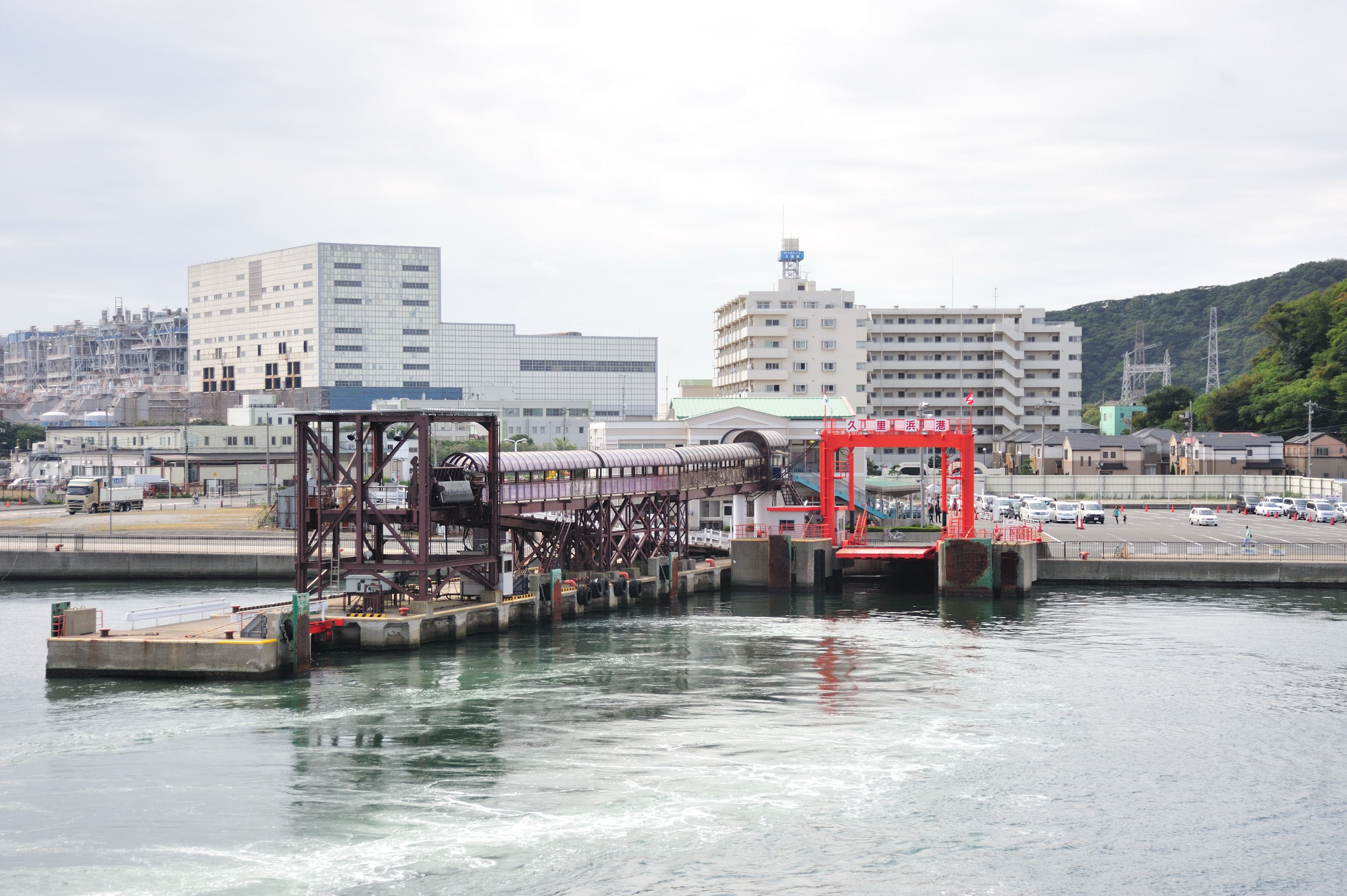
Kurihama ferry terminal

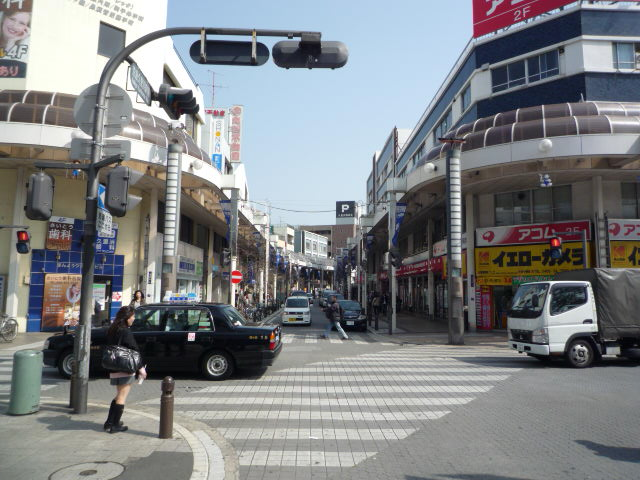
Kurihama commercial district

== See also ==
- Japan – United States relations
