= Fuchū Air Base =

Coordinates: 35.676°N 139.495°E

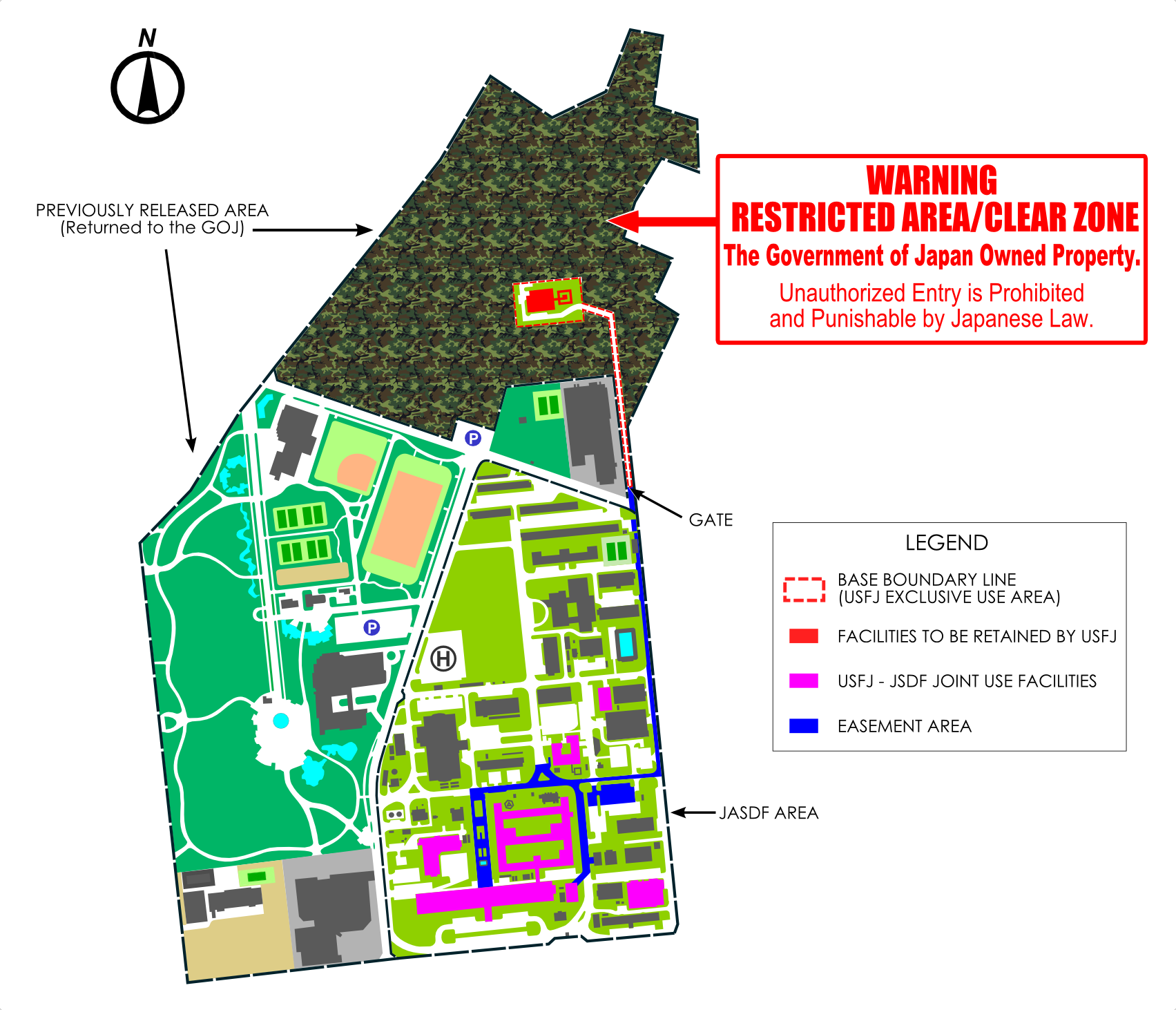
Fuchu AS 2008

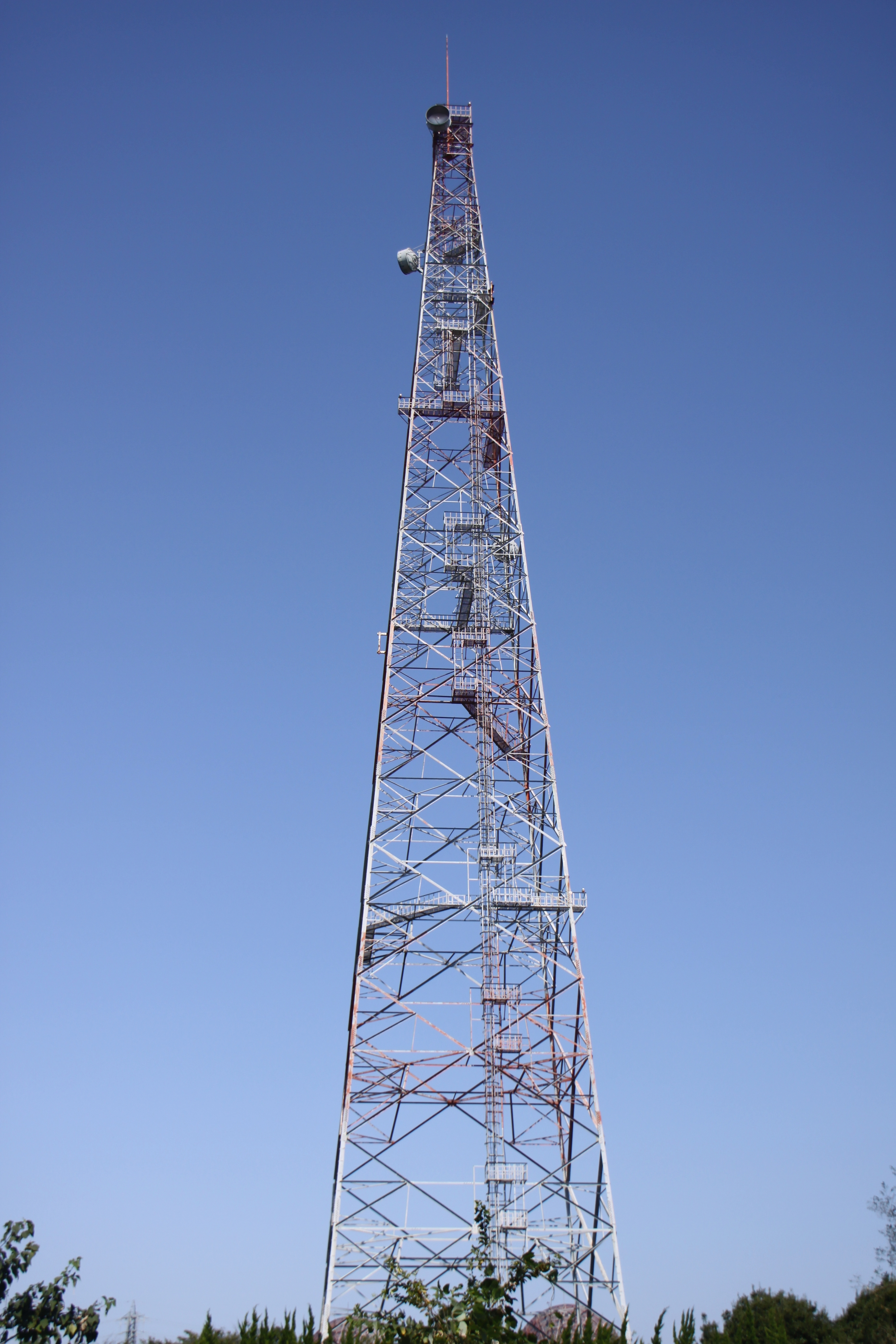
Fuchu Communications Station 01

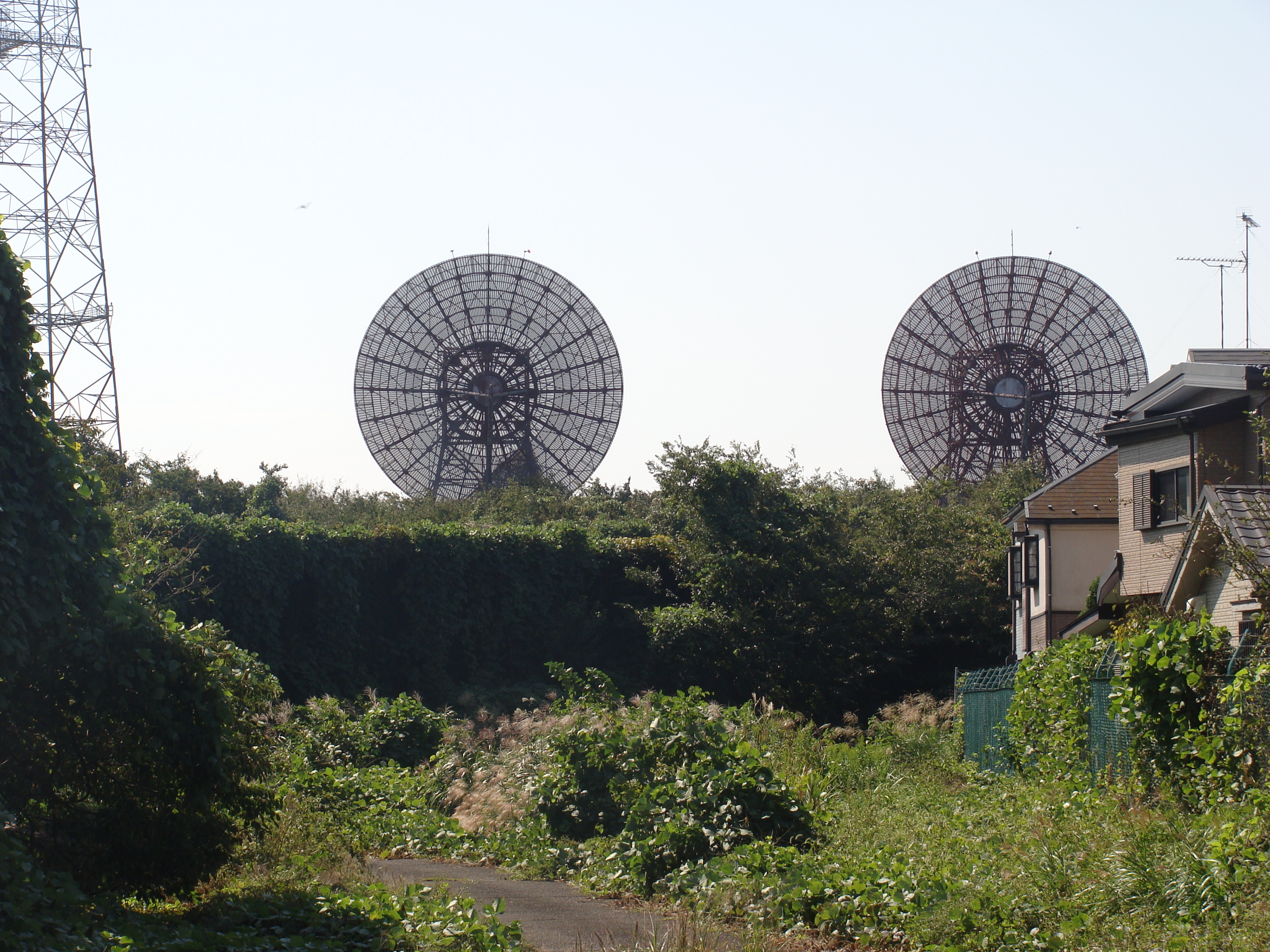
Fuchu Communications Station 02

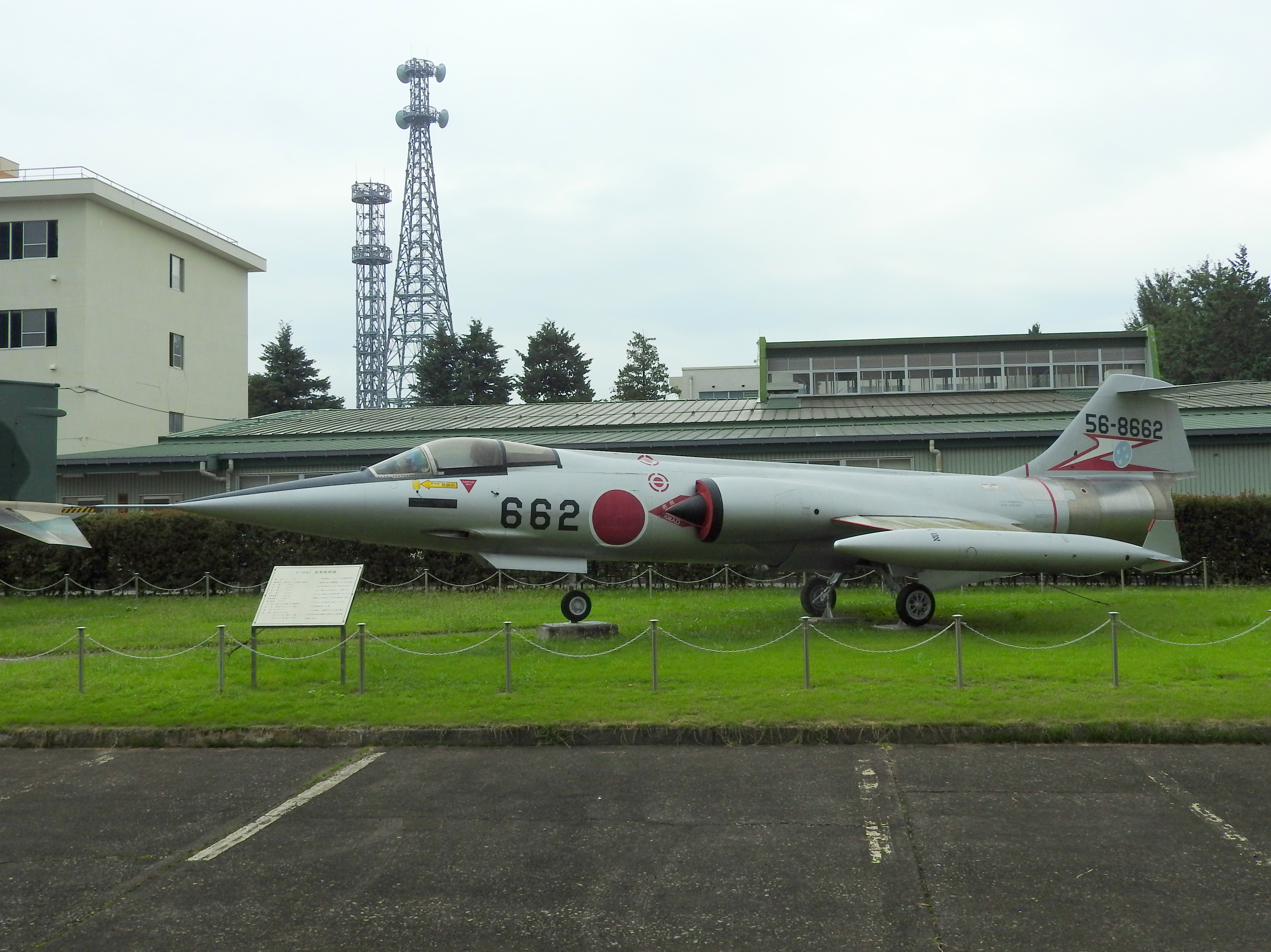
Lockheed F-104J Starfighter

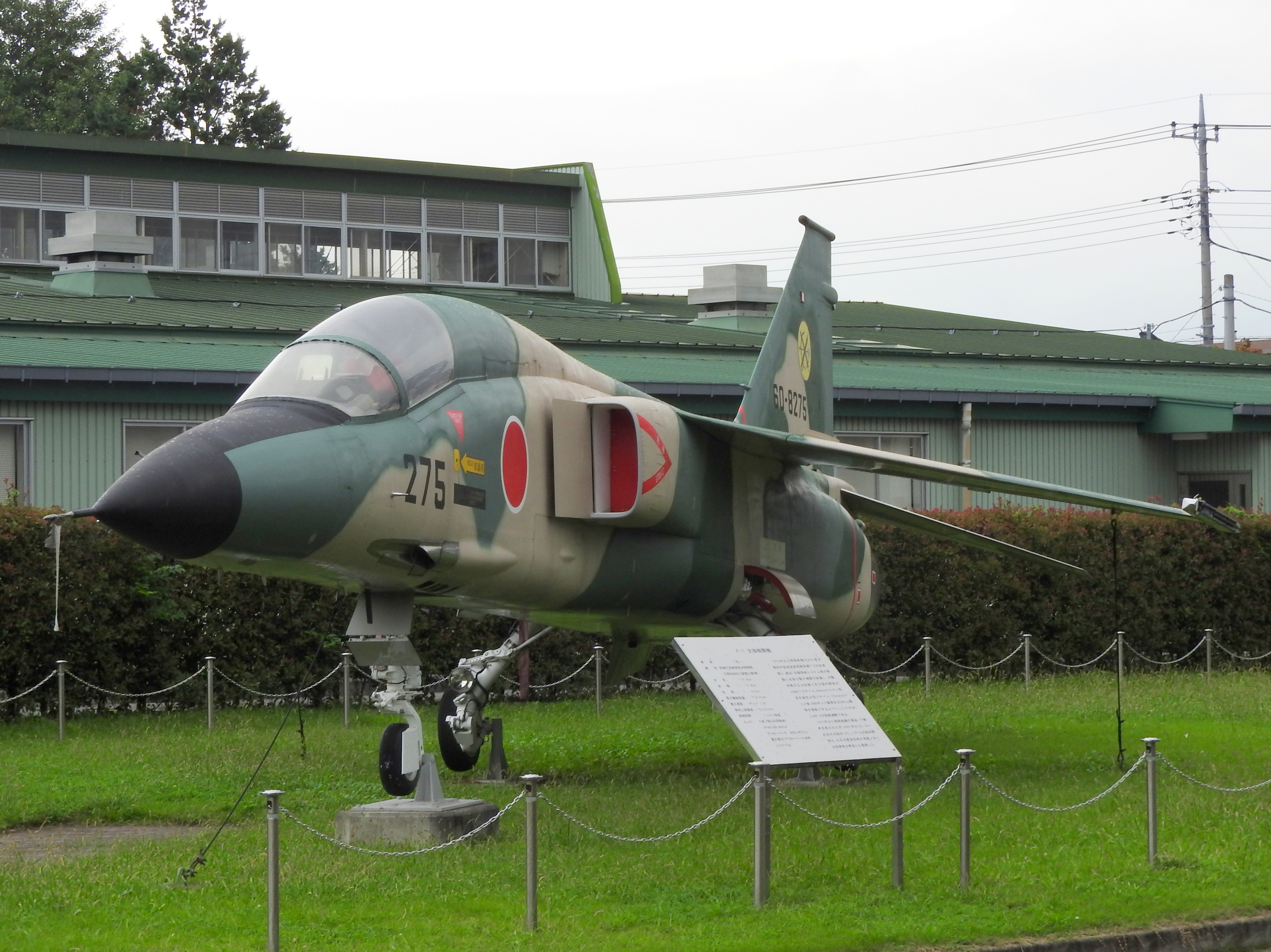
Mitsubishi F-1

Fuchu Air Base (府中基地, Fuchū Kichi) is a Japan Air Self-Defense Force (JASDF) base located in Fuchū, Tokyo. It was originally an Imperial Japanese Army base from 1940 to 1945. After the Japanese surrender it was occupied by US forces and became a US military base known as Fuchu Air Station.

The Japan Self-Defense Forces started operating at the base in 1957, and it was also the first headquarters of the United States Forces Japan from 1957 to 1974, when the headquarters moved to Yokota Air Base.

In 1975, major portions of Fuchu Air Station was returned to the Government of Japan (GOJ), and USAF retained small portion for the Automatic Voice Network tandem switch, Troposcatter Site (JTS), and associated Technical Control Facility (TCF). About a third of the base became a JASDF base, some of the land became a park and sporting grounds, and the area in the north of the base around the troposcatter dishes that were used to maintain radio contact with Misawa Air Base in Aomori remains closed and unoccupied.

Air Support Command of the JASDF is based at Fuchu. The Air Traffic Control Service Group and the Air Weather Service Group are located at the base.

On display near the main entrance of the base are two jet fighters formerly operated by the JASDF, a Lockheed F-104 Starfighter and a Mitsubishi F-1.
