= Bin Kashiwa =

Japanese painter (1944-2023)

- 柏崎 敏一(Toshikazu Kashiwazaki)
- Born: Toshikazu Kashiwazaki; May 15, 1944
- Died: September 6, 2023 (aged 79)
- Occupation: Painter
- Notable work: Streets of Paris
- Website: binkashiwa-art.com ameblo.jp/bin-kashiwa/

Bin Kashiwa (real name: Toshikazu Kashiwazaki, May 15, 1944 - September 6, 2023) is a Japanese painter. He began his career as a hotel worker, but was captivated by the world of Henri Rousseau and suddenly began his career as a painter. He painted for tourists on the hills of Montmartre in Paris. His "Streets of Paris" of the good old days, the world of imagination "Paradise", and his "Family" series, based on human love, and the fairy tale world he depicts, have captured the hearts of many people.

== Career ==
Born in Karafuto in 1944 to his father Tomekichi and mother Yoshi, he returned to his parents' hometown of Akita and then moved to Kushiro. He studied at the old Asahi Elementary School, Kyoei Junior High School, and Kushiro Commercial High School, but he says he didn't put much effort into painting as a child. After graduating from high school, he worked as a salesman at a car dealership in Kushiro, but moved to Tokyo because he thought "Kushiro has nothing to offer. It's boring." He tried various jobs, including acting and waiting, but was sent to Denmark for training at the hotel where he worked and stayed in Europe. The turning point came in the summer of 1971, when he was robbed while on a tourist trip in Paris. He started drawing pictures to earn a living, but gradually the pictures started to sell, and he was eventually recognized as a naif painter, staying in Paris for 15 years and holding solo exhibitions around the world.

He also gained popularity in Japan when his works were used for the cover of the textbook for NHK's "French Language Lessons," and he also received more work creating original illustrations for corporate posters.

Although Bin Kashiwa had become a best-selling author, one day he suddenly felt a strong desire to return to his hometown of Kushiro and his parents. He returned to Japan in 1984 and set up a home and studio in Kushiro. Since then, he has often produced illustrations of Kushiro and Hokkaido, including a poster jointly produced by three tourist associations in eastern Hokkaido and "New Paradise Kushiro" to commemorate the merger of Kushiro City.

== Episode ==
- During his time as a painter in Paris, Bin Kashiwa met Hiro Yamagata on the hill of Montmartre, and Hiro Yamagata approached Bin Kashiwa, who was already famous, and asked for advice on painting. As a result, Bin Kashiwa and Hiro Yamagata's paintings, especially those from around the 1970s, are very similar in style, and Bin Kashiwa is considered to be Hiro Yamagata's teacher.
- There are passionate collectors of Bin Kashiwa's works both in Japan and abroad, and the Sun Valley Museum of Art at the Nasu Sun Valley Hotel in Tochigi Prefecture has a collection of about 200 original drawings and lithographs, and the Repetto Fontanella in Milan, Italy has a collection of about 50 works.
- Bin Kashiwa's hobby in his later years was marathon running, and he frequently reported on his marathon activities on his personal blog, "Bin Kashiwa's Daily Life."
- After Bin Kashiwa's death, his son Akira Kashiwazaki has been managing and updating Bin Kashiwa's Facebook and blog, and he also launched a website called "The World of Bin Kashiwa" to introduce his work and sell his artworks.
- Bin Kashiwa still owns and runs the coffee shop "詩瑠絵燈（Silhouette）" in Kushiro, Hokkaido, and many of Bin Kashiwa's artworks are displayed inside the shop.

== Major Awards ==
- Kushiro City Cultural Award (2024）

== Main publications ==
- Author of The World of Bin Kashiwa (NHK Publishing, 1988)

== Major solo exhibitions and art history ==
1973 Fidelity World Art (Illinois, USA)

1974 Fritz Ernest Studio (Zurich, Switzerland)

1975 Pinchpenny Galleries (New York)

1976 Anita Gordon Art Collection (Montreal, Canada)

1977 Gallery Aramayo (Uruguay)

1978-79 Gallery Propanes (Saint-Propane, France)

1986 Original artwork for the farewell ticket for the Japanese National Railways' "From the Land of Love to Happiness"

1987 Original artwork for the Hiroo Santaland poster and Tokachi Ocean Expo poster

Original artwork for the Obihiro Green Frontier Festival and the Guinness World Record for the "Biggest Painting in the World"

Invited to exhibit at the '87 New York Art Expo

1988 Publication of the art book "The World of Bin Kashiwa" (NHK Publishing)

1988 Japan traveling exhibition (sponsored by NHK Service Center Foundation) begins

1989: Shinjuku Isetan, Christmas (Naive Christmas) full-store display production

Museums such as Osaka Daimaru, Fukuoka Iwataya, Niigata Seibu, Shinjuku Isetan,

NHK-sponsored traveling exhibition

1990: French government New Year's greetings production

1991: Nippon Oil Corporation calendar (festival series) production

1992: Barcelona Olympics Gaudi series production

1993: Sapporo Mitsukoshi "The World of Bin Kashiwa" exhibition held

1994: Sapporo Snow Festival, Chitose Terminal exhibition held

1995: Shinjuku Keio Plaza Held a tribute art exhibition at Laza

1996 Hiroshima Sogo and Shibuya Tobu (Bin Kashiwa's Animal Land Exhibition)

1997 Mitsukoshi Kagoshima, Odakyu Shinjuku (Bin Kashiwa's World Exhibition)

1998 Ebisu Mitsukoshi (Santa is coming to town), Sapporo Mitsukoshi (Bin Kashiwa's World Exhibition)

1999 Ginza Mitsukoshi, Matsuyama Mitsukoshi, Sapporo Mitsukoshi

2000 Produced crystal calendars and original fashion watches

2003 Held "Bin Kashiwa's World Exhibition" mainly in Hokkaido

2005 Created the original painting "New Paradise Kushiro" to commemorate the merger of Kushiro City

2011 Provided the "Nusamai Bridge and Sunset" for the local Nanaco Card Kushiro City
