= Kashiwa Airfield =

WW2 Japanese airfield

Coordinates: 35°36′18″N 140°07′24″E

Kashiwa Airfield was an airfield in Chiba Prefecture, Japan. It was used by the Japanese Army Air Force until 30 October, when an artillery battery of the 112th Cavalry Regimental Combat Team occupied the base.
