= Utsunomiya Air Field =

- IATA: none; ICAO: RJTU

Summary
- Airport type: Military
- Operator: Japan Ground Self-Defense Force
- Location: Utsunomiya, Japan
- Elevation AMSL: 334 ft (102 m)
- Coordinates: 36°30′52″N 139°52′15″E

Map
- Location in Japan

Runways
Direction	Length		Surface
Direction	m	ft	Surface
01/19	1,700	5,577	Concrete
- Source: Japanese AIP at AIS Japan

Utsunomiya Air Field (宇都宮飛行場, Utsunomiya Hikōjō) (ICAO: RJTU) is a military aerodrome of the Japan Ground Self-Defense Force Camp Kita-Utsunomiya (北宇都宮駐屯地, Kita-Utsunomiya Chūtonchi). It is located 3.3 NM (6.1 km; 3.8 mi) south of Utsunomiya in the Tochigi Prefecture, Japan.
