= Véhicule de l'Avant Blindé =

French armoured personnel carrier

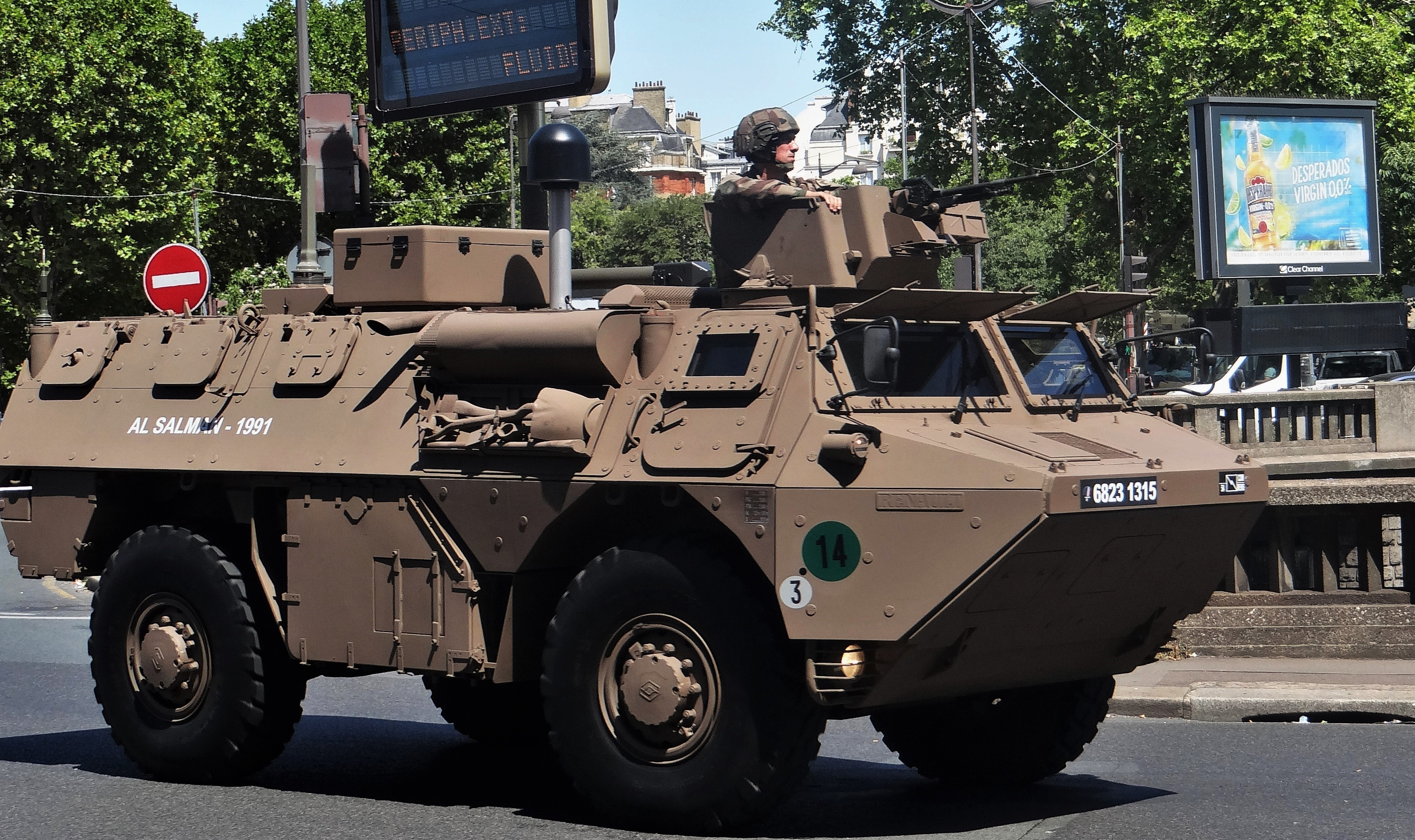
- A French VAB APC following the 2022 Bastille Day Parade
- Type: Armoured personnel carrier
- Place of origin: France

Service history
- In service: 1979 – present
- Used by: See Operators
- Wars: Western Sahara War; Lebanese Civil War; Opération Épervier; Gulf War; Opération Turquoise; Bosnian War; War in Afghanistan; 2003–2004 Indonesian offensive in Aceh; Opération Licorne; Operation Serval; Opération Sangaris; Opération Barkhane; Saudi Arabian-led intervention in Yemen; Russo-Ukrainian War

Production history
- Designer: GIAT Industries
- Designed: 1970–1977
- Manufacturer: Renault Trucks Defense; MACK Defense
- No. built: 5,000

Specifications
- Mass: 13 t in combat order (standard); 13.8 t empty and 15.8 t loaded (upgraded VAB ultima)
- Length: 5.98 m (19 ft 7 in)
- Width: 2.49 m (8 ft 2 in)
- Height: 2.06 m (6 ft 9 in)
- Crew: 2
- Passengers: 10
- Armour: cage, ballistic blanket Steel armour providing protection against 7.62 mm bullets, artillery shell splinters and anti-personnel mines Upgrades with MEXAS composite armour and mine protection Protection for up to 12.7 mm for the front and turret
- Main armament: 1 × AA52 7.62 mm machine gun or 1x M2 12.7mm machine gun
- Engine: Renault MIDS 062045; 235 kW (320 hp)
- Power/weight: 17 W/kg (23 hp/t)
- Suspension: wheeled
- Ground clearance: 0.4 m (1 ft 4 in)
- Fuel capacity: 310 litres
- Operational range: 1,200 km (750 mi)
- Maximum speed: 110 km/h (68 mph); 7.92 km/h (4.3 knots) in water

The Véhicule de l'Avant Blindé (VAB; literally meaning "Armoured Forward Vehicle"; but more appropriately translated: "Armoured Vanguard Vehicle") is a French armoured personnel carrier and support vehicle designed and manufactured by Renault Trucks Defense (now known as Arquus). It entered French service in 1979 and around 5,000 were produced for the French Army as well as for export. It has seen combat in various conflicts in Africa, Asia as well as Europe and has also been exported to more than 15 countries.

A polyvalent military vehicle, the VAB has more than thirty variants and sub-variants. Beyond their common primary role of transporting personnel and equipment in combat zones, some VAB are tailored for mechanized infantry combat, some fulfill the role of anti-tank missile launchers, some of self-propelled mortars, some are optimized for electronic warfare, others act as reconnaissance or artillery observation vehicles, etc.

As of 2019, it still is the standard APC of the French Army but is gradually being replaced by its successors, the six-wheel VBMR Griffon (introduced in 2019) and the four-wheel VBMR-L Serval (introduced in 2022).

== Design ==
The VAB was designed as a wheeled troop transporter, complementing the tracked AMX-10P. Specifications for the project called for an NBC-proof, amphibious (Its propulsion in water is either by its wheels or twin water jets), lightly armoured vehicle to provide infantry with basic protection against shrapnel and light infantry weapons. These features were dictated by its possible usage in the event of an all-out conventional war breaking out against the Warsaw Pact; in particular, the amphibious capabilities were needed to bridge the rivers in Eastern France and in Germany.

Companies Panhard and Saviem/Renault answered the requirement, and the Renault prototype was selected in May 1974, with 4,000 units ordered. The first delivery occurred in 1976, and production continued at a rate of 30 to 40 units a month.

An armoured double-door at the rear allows access to the passenger compartment. Two inward-facing, foldable benches provide seating for 5 soldiers each. The crew enters the front compartment through two lateral hatches, the driver on the left and gunner on the right; two additional hatches in the roof give access to armaments and provide emergency exits. The front windows are bullet-proof and heated. All the windows can be further protected by armoured panels, which can be shut entirely or leaving a small observation slit. The engine is located behind the driver, while the right side of the vehicle is kept free, providing a passageway between the crew and passenger compartments.

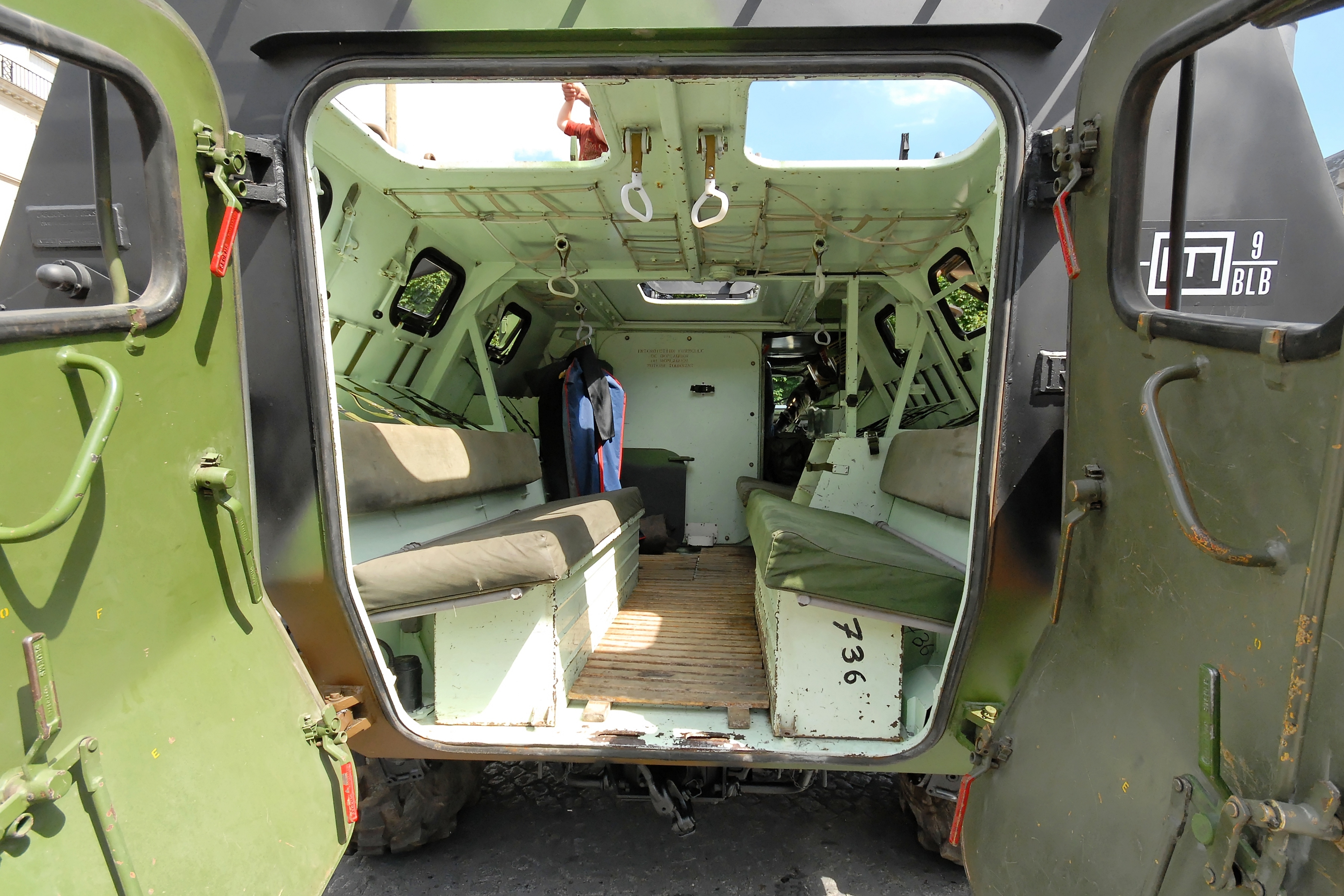
rear doors and crew bench

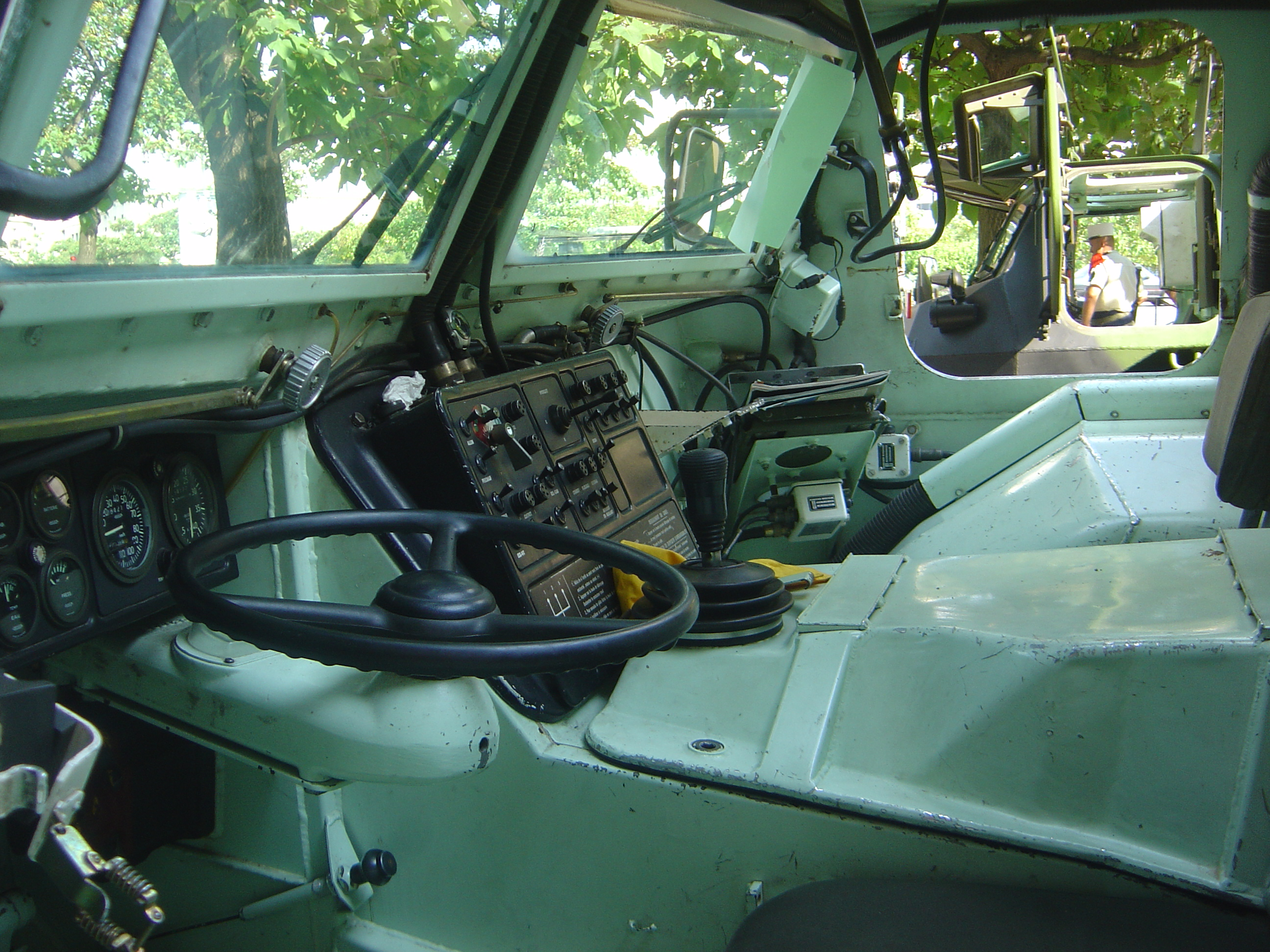
forward compartment

With a modest 13-tonne mass, the VAB can easily be airlifted for deployment abroad.

The VAB's large wheels allow it to sustain up to 60% grades and road/rail canting of up to 30%.

From 1998, the French Army's VABs underwent three major overhauls:

- replacement of the manual gear by an automatic transmission (T1)
- replacement of the brakes and automatic tire pressurization (T2)
- armour upgrade (T3)

These overhauled vehicles are known as VAB Valorisé. From 1990, the VAB NG (new generation) with improved armour and new engine was offered. In the 2000s, Renault offered engine upgrades to any VABs in service from MAN diesel engines to Renault MIDS 06 20 45 turbocharged diesel engines by removing the torque converterer oil reservoir bracket, modifying the existing right-hand engine bracket and the installation of a cooling unit.

In 2003, Renault Trucks Défense took over marketing the VAB from GIAT. At Eurosatory 2010, Renault unveiled the heavier VAB MkII, with more internal space and Level 4 protection. The MkII version was also shown in the BRIDEX 2011 convention.

In Eurosatory 2012; the VAB MkIII was presented publicly, being a new vehicle with better protection against IEDs and anti-vehicle mines up to STANAG Level 4 protection. Armored plating against RPG rockets is made in collaboration with Plasan.

It's being marketed only in a 6x6 wheeled configuration with either a Renault MD7 engine developing 340 hp or a Caterpillar C7 developing 370 hp with automatic transmission.

=== Armour upgrade ===
A Véhicule de l'Avant Blindé armed with a 20 mm gun turret, with added armour, deployed in Afghanistan on 19 August 2009

The upgrade of the VAB with MEXAS composite armour aimed at increasing from protection against light infantry weapons to protection against heavy machine guns, typically 12.7 mm projectiles. This increased the weight of the vehicles by about two tonnes, thereby losing its amphibious capabilities.

The amphibious shape of the hull, the relatively light weight and the armour upgrade seem to give the VAB strong resistance against mines. When exposed to an explosion from below, the VAB tends to be lifted in the air, allowing the force of the blast to disperse away from the vehicle. In particular, the hull shape and position of the wheels deflects the shock wave, helping maintain hull integrity.

=== Turrets ===
The heavy machine gun version of the Véhicule de l'Avant Blindé carries a M2HB 12.7mm machine gun in an open turret; the light version sports the AA52 7.5mm machine gun in a similar arrangement.

The AA-52 is a 7.62mm GPMG mounted on the VAB has a length of 1,080 mm and a barrel length of 600 mm. Weighing 9.970 kg, this machine gun operates through a lever-delayed blowback action mechanism, enabling a maximum rate of fire of 900 rounds per minute. Its effective firing range spans 600 meters, with a maximum firing range of 3,200 meters. The AA-52 is equipped with a belt feed system and features Iron Removable APX (SOM) telescopic sights and an infrared scope for precision targeting. The ammunition utilized includes rifle rounds with a caliber of 7.62, compatible with cartridges such as the 7.5×54mm French and the 7.62×51mm NATO. With a muzzle velocity of 830 m/s, the AA-52 is capable of delivering sustained firepower with a basic load of 900 rounds.

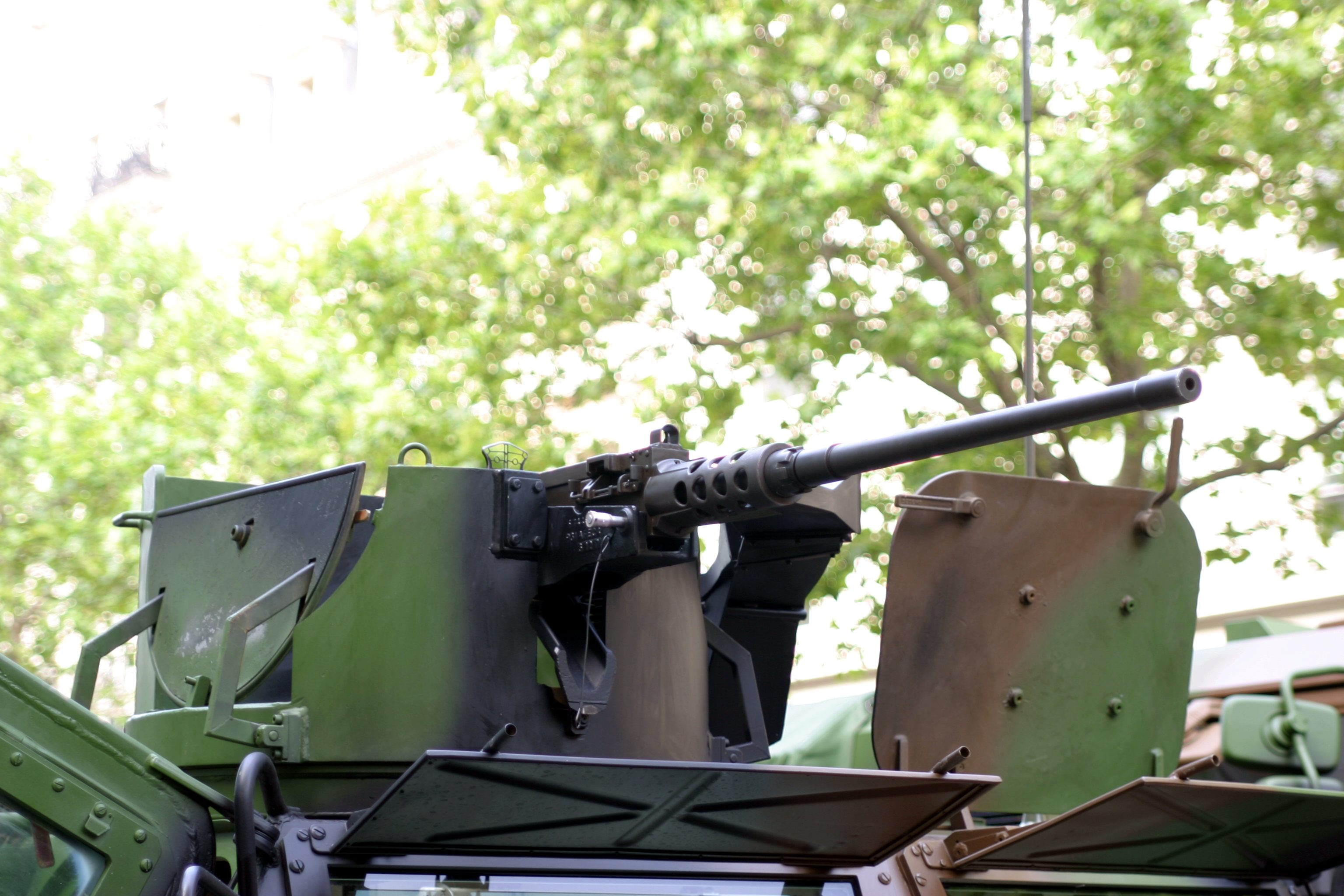
Detail of open machine gun turret

In both cases, the gunner's only protection from incoming fire is an armoured panel on the front and the two halves of the hatch door on the sides, giving little protection against indirect fire, surprise attacks and explosions — or if the VAB rolls over. As of July 2007, all the personnel killed by mines aboard VABs had occupied the gunner position (though serious injuries were sometimes sustained by crewmen inside the hull).

From 2007, the Army head of staff repeatedly requested that remotely operated 12.7mm turrets be fitted on these vehicles, as a crash requirement. A program was launched, scheduling turret and battle command upgrades for over 500 VABs, now labeled VAB TOP (tourelle TéléOPérée). In May 2008, Renault Trucks Defense signed an eight-year, 20 million euro contract with Kongsberg Gruppen of Norway, for equipping the VAB with subsidiary Kongsberg Defence & Aerospace's Protector Remote Weapon Station (RWS). Deliveries were scheduled from 2009 to 2016.

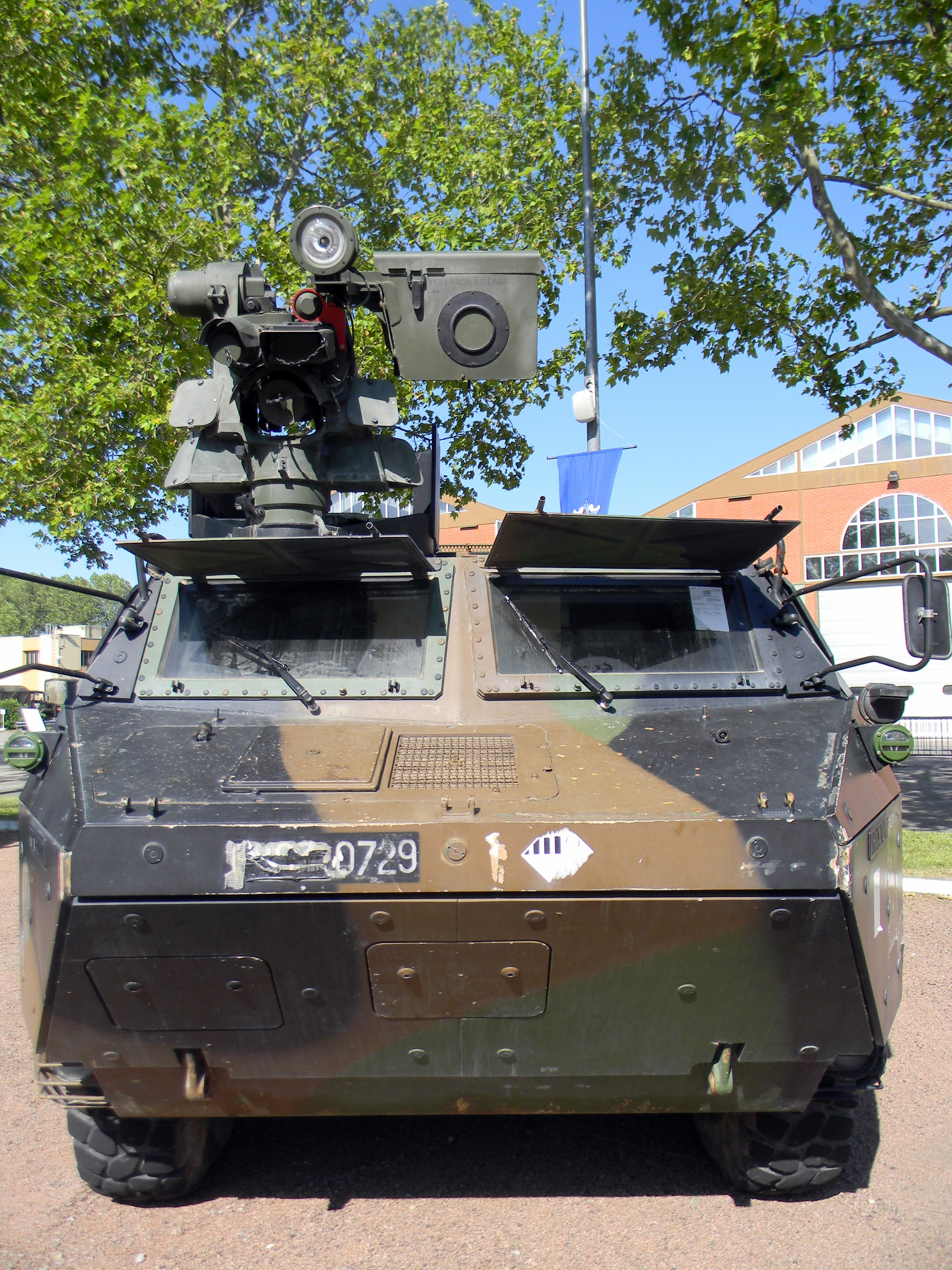
Equipped with Protector Remote Weapon Station

From early 2009 onwards, about 60 VAB-TOP were deployed in Afghanistan, seeing their first combat during the Battle of Alasay. Field experience shows a significant drop in ammunition consumption with the tele-operated turret, whose computer allows the operator to fire efficient single shots, rather than bursts. This partially alleviates concerns raised by the need to reload this turret from outside.

=== Replacement ===
Replacement of the VAB is scheduled for around 2020. A diesel-electric vehicle stemming from the EBM10-EBM20 programme is due to be selected. The Armoured Multirole Carrier has been cited as a strong contender.

== Combat history ==
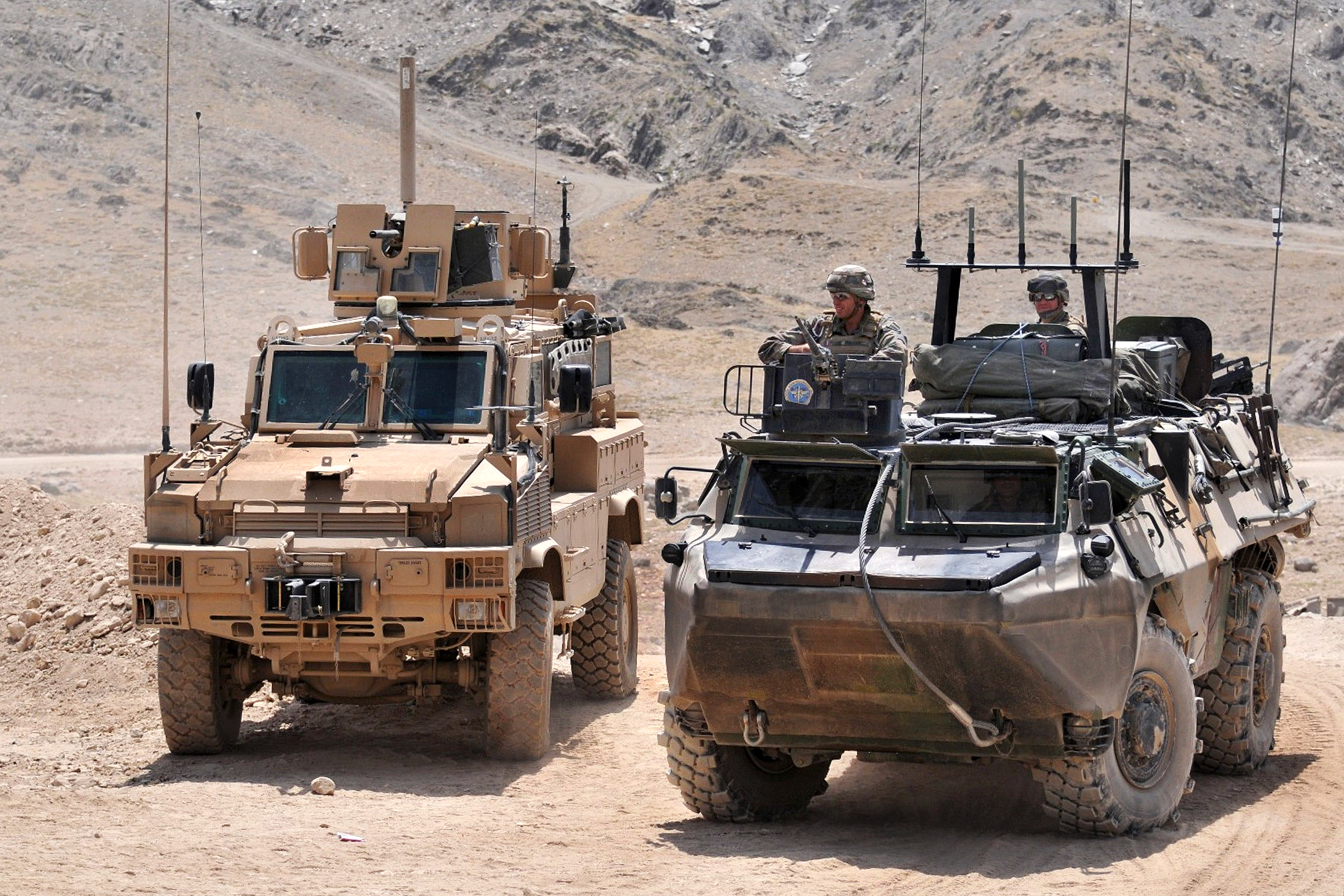
VAB deployed with the French contingent of the ISAF (right), next to a US MRAP, 7 August 2009.

VABs have been deployed in virtually all theatres where French infantry troops were present, notably Kuwait, Côte d'Ivoire, Yugoslavia, and Chad. French troops supporting ISAF in Afghanistan also use the VAB. During the Uzbin valley ambush, a VAB was hit by a rocket propelled grenade, with no injuries. One soldier manning the rooftop machine gun of a VAB was later killed when the road collapsed under his vehicle and it rolled over. In March 2009, a VAB driver was killed by a rocket attack during the battle of Alasay.

=== Africa ===
VABs belonging to the Royal Moroccan Army (FAR) have seen heavy combat during the conflict with Polisario rebels of the Western Sahara.

=== Asia ===
VABs of the Indonesian Army were deployed during the May 1998 riots in Jakarta. Indonesian VABs seen combat during the 2003–2004 Indonesian offensive in Aceh. The Garuda Contingent for the UNIFIL in Lebanon also used VABs starting in 2007.

=== Middle East ===
A total of 95 VABs were delivered to the Lebanese Army between 1981 and 1984, being extensively employed during the Lebanese Civil War, with several vehicles serving under the Shia Amal Movement militia banner after the Army's predominantly Shia 6th Infantry Brigade went over to their coreligionists in February 1984. After the end of the war in the 1990s, additional VABs were delivered to the Lebanese Internal Security Forces (ISF) for use in the escort and internal security roles.

=== Ukraine ===
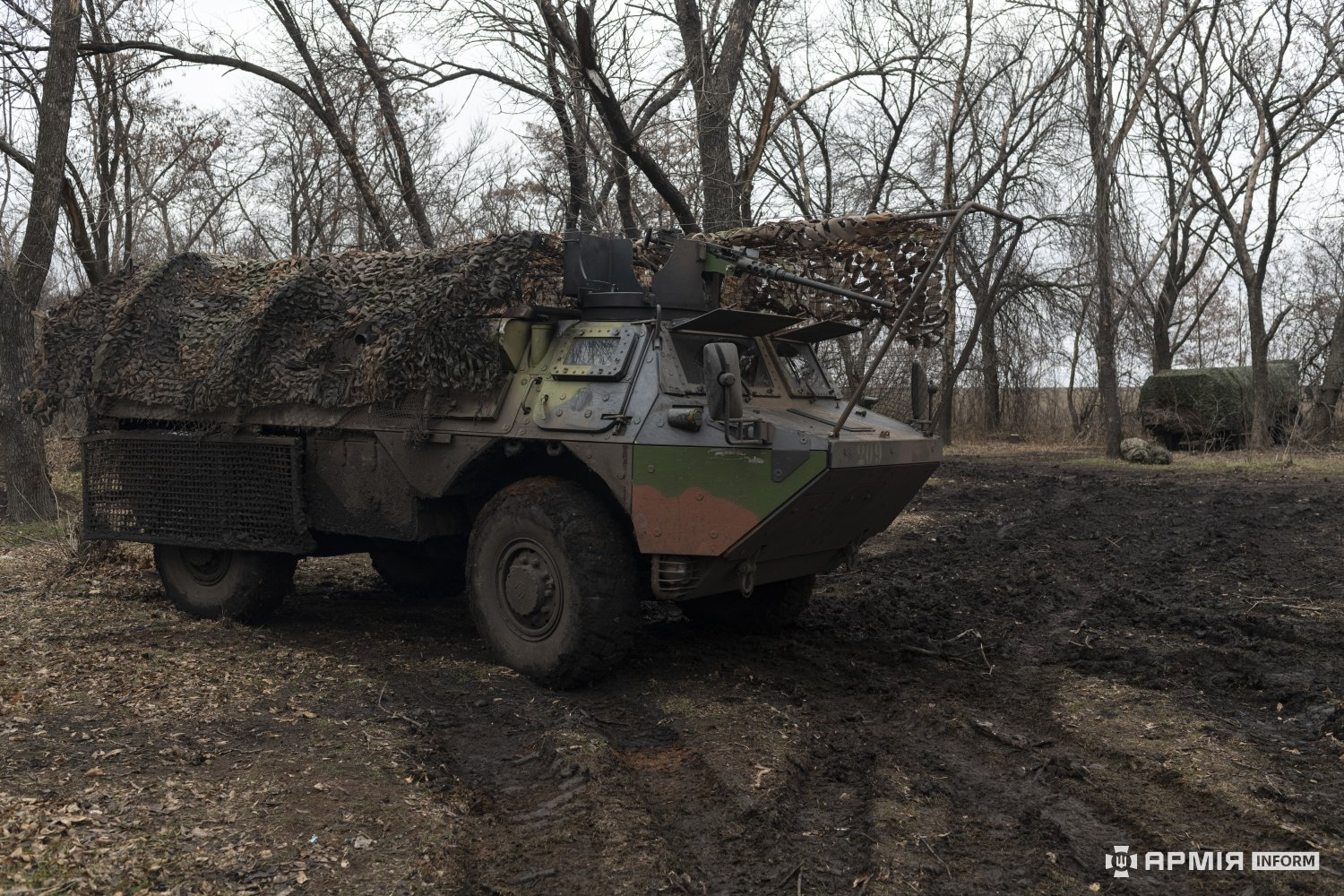
VAB in service with the Ukrainian 155th Mechanized Brigade

As of March 2025, at least 30 VAB vehicles were visually confirmed to be destroyed during the Russian invasion of Ukraine. A further 13 were damaged and abandoned.

== Variants ==
Variants may be 4×4 or 6×6 wheels, the 6×6 yielding a 10% increase in cost. The French military only uses 4-wheel versions, while export versions mainly are 6×6s.

The following VAB variants are/were made:

- VAB MK 3, 6x6 APC version- A highly improved version of the VAB with better performance in terms of mobility protection in payload
- VAB VTT (Véhicule Transport de Troupe) – 4x4 APC version, crew of two and ten passengers and standard pintle mount for various compatible machine guns.
  - VAB TOP (tourelle TéléOPérée) – VTT 4x4 fitted with a Kongsberg Protector (RWS) with 12.7mm machine gun and ceramic add-on armour.
  - VAB AZURE (Action en Zone URbaine) – Urban warfare vehicle equipped with a dozer blade and with panoramic periscopes to observe and monitor.
  - VAB ELI (élément léger d'intervention) – light recovery vehicle.
  - VAB-VCAC MILAN (VCAC standing for Véhicule de Combat Anti-Char) – French army variant of the VTT, fitted with a pintle mount for the MILAN system at the rear hull roof.
  - VAB AT4CS – French army variant of the VTT, used by anti-tank teams armed with the AT4CS 84 mm portable rocket launcher.
  - VAB Eryx – French army variant of the VTT, used by anti-tank teams armed with the Eryx system.
- VAB RATAC – Artillery target acquisition vehicle, carries a DR-PC 1a RATAC doppler radar with a range of 20 km.
- VAB RASIT – Reconnaissance vehicle, carries the DR-PT 2a RASIT ground surveillance radar.
- VAB PC (Poste de Commandement) – Command vehicle with a crew of 6 and equipped with map tables and additional signals equipment.
  - VAB SIR (Système d'Information Régimentaire) – Digital regimental C4ISTAR information system.
- VAB Bromure – Electronic warfare vehicle.
- VAB Echelon – Maintenance and repair vehicle. Equipped with hydraulic jib crane for swapping power pack and winches for pulling VABs free of obstacles.
- VAB Génie – Engineering vehicle that can be fitted with a light obstacle clearing blade or can be used to tow a trailer with mine-clearing charges.
- VAB SAN (sanitaire) – Armoured ambulance with room for 5 stretchers or 10 sitting passengers.
- VAB Reco – NBC reconnaissance vehicle.
- VAB ATLAS (Automatisation des Tirs et Liaisons Sol-sol pour l'artillerie) – Artillery fire command and control vehicle, successor of the VAB ATILA.
- VAB SGEA (Système de Guerre Électronique de l'Avant) – Electronic warfare variant.
- VAB Rapsodie (Radar d'Acquisition Polyvalent pour la Surveillance et l'Observation Destiné à l'Interarmes) – Reconnaissance vehicle with radar.
- VBR (Véhicule Blindé de Reconnaissance) – Similar to VIB but used by Génie de l'Air and fitted with a Capre turret with 20 mm F2 gun.

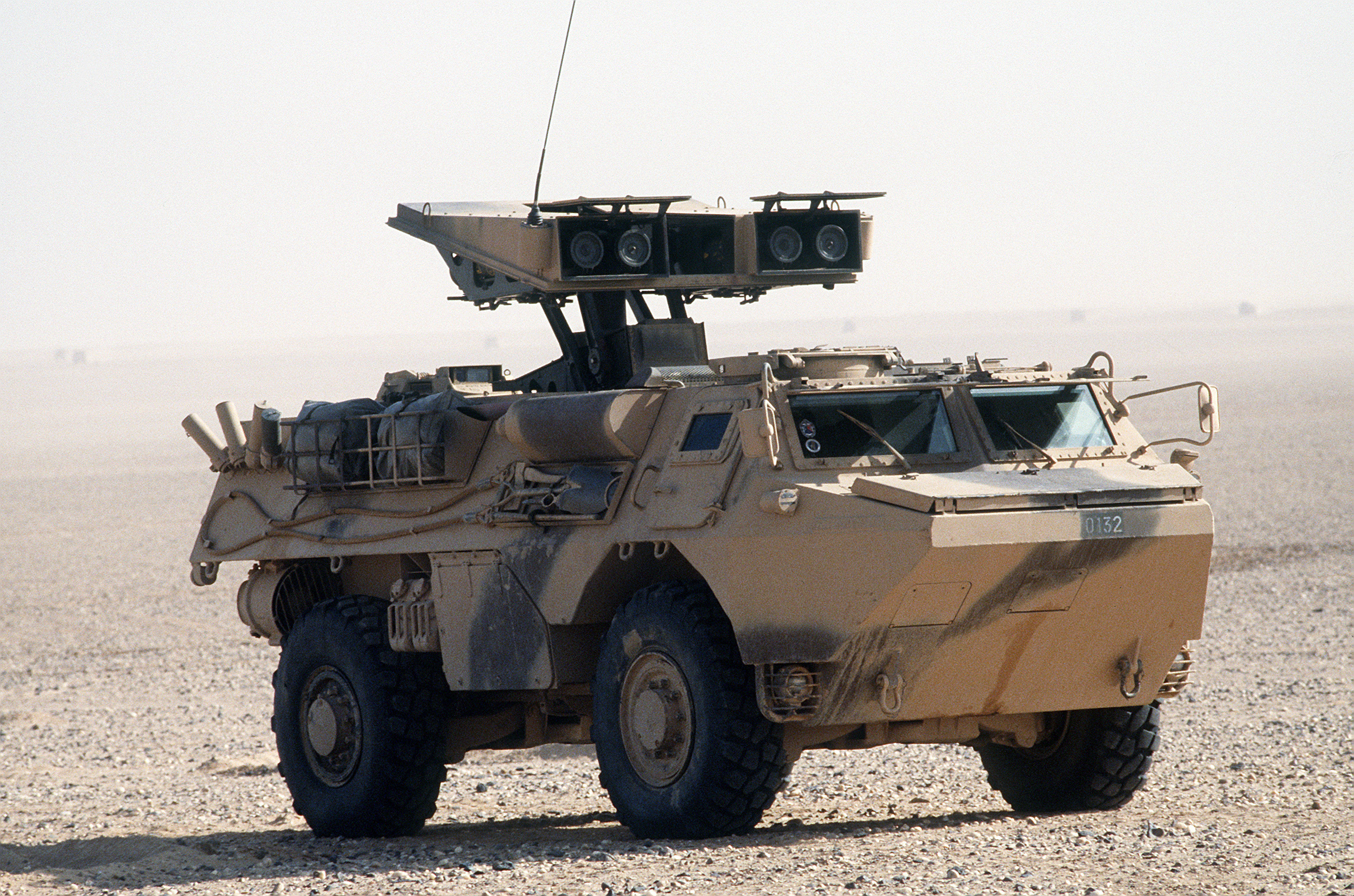
VAB Mephisto anti-tank missile variant

- VAB Mephisto (also called VAB HOT) – Anti-tank vehicle, carries the Euromissile Mephisto system with four ready-to-fire HOT anti-tank missiles and eight more in reserve. They both fire the French HOT (Haut subsonique Optiquement Téléguidé Tiré d’un Tube) Anti-Tank Missile. The HOT is a wire-guided missile with semi-automatic command-to-line-of-sight (SACLOS) guidance. It's been around since the 1970s and the latest version is the HOT-3.
- VCI T.20/13 (Véhicule de Combat de l'Infanterie) – VAB equipped with a turret mounted 20 mm gun recovered from old AMX-VCIs and refurbished and intended for fire support and for counter sniping.

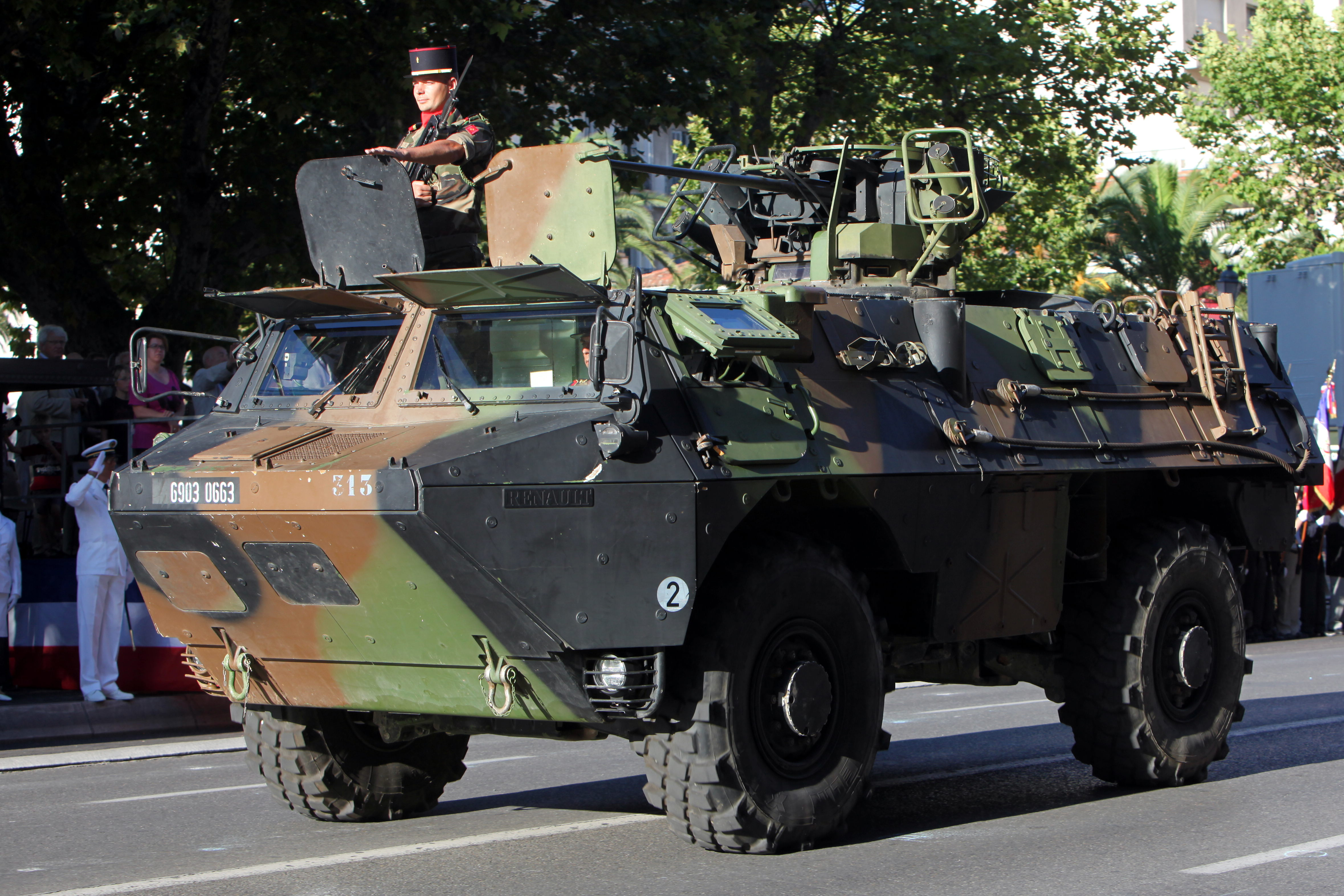
VIB 20 mm turret variant

- VIB (Véhicule d'Intervention sur Base) – IFV version fitted with the Toucan system, a tele-operated turret fitted with a 20 mm cannon and a AA52 7.62 mm machine-gun. Used by the French Air Force for airfield defence.
- VIT (Véhicule d'Implantation Topographique) – Vehicle for topographic teams of field artillery units.

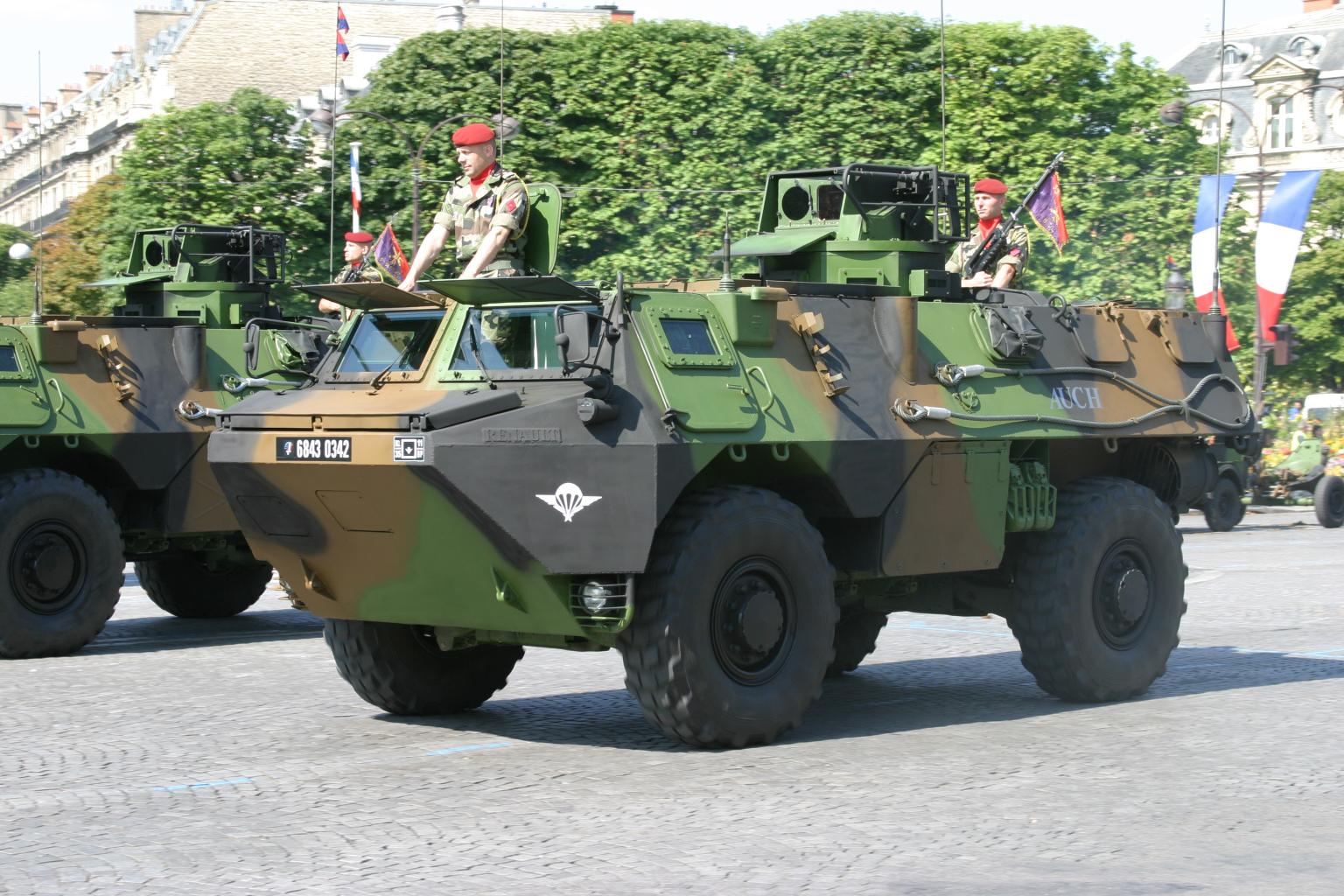
VOA artillery spotting variant

- VOA (Véhicule d'Observation d'Artillerie) – Artillery observation vehicle, fitted with a turret with day/night observation devices, laser range finder etc. This version is normally found in units equipped with the TR F1 towed 155 mm howitzer. The VAB OBS is an improved version.
- VTM 120 (Véhicule Tracteur de Mortier) – Mortar towing vehicle, can carry 70 bombs for the Thomson-Brandt MO-120 mortar.
- VAB 2R2M — self-propelled mortar 120 mm.
- VBC-90: Armoured car variant with a 90 mm gun in a turret. In service with the Mobile Gendarmerie until 2004.
- VAB Ultima – Upgrades to the VAB against IEDs and land mines with added blast seats not fixed to the floor, Sagem SITEL comm equipment and FELIN battery chargers. Equipped with Protector RCWS for either a machine gun or AGL.
- VAB SAN (Sanitaire – Sanitary) CIED (Counter-IED) – Upgrades to the VAB for ambulance purposes for French forces operating in the Sahel as jihadi forces tend to target them with explosives and IEDs.

Versions reserved for export:

- VAB 4x4 VCI T.20 (Véhicule de Combat de l'Infanterie) – Export version of the VCI T.20/13, fitted with a one-man T.20 turret. In service with Cyprus.
- VAB 6x6 ECH (ECHelon) – Maintenance vehicle (with crane).
- VAB 6x6 VCI Toucan (Véhicule de Combat de l'Infanterie) – Similar to the VCI T.20/13 but based on the VAB 6x6.
- VAB 6x6 VPM 81 (Véhicule Porte-Mortier) – Mortar carrier with an 81 mm mortar firing through a roof opening. In service with Oman.
- VAB 6x6 VDAA TA20 (Véhicule de Défense AntiAérienne) – Low-altitude air-defence vehicle, armed with a double 20 mm gun in a TA 20 turret. In service with Oman, Morocco and the Central African Republic.
- VCAC 6x6 UTM800 – Anti-tank vehicle, carries the Euromissile UTM800 turret, with four ready-to-launch HOT missiles, and 16 more in reserve. In service with Qatar and Cyprus.
- VBMO (Véhicule Blindé de Maintien de l'Ordre) – Police version for crowd control, fitted with a light dozer blade and optionally a TOI turret. In service with Oman, Morocco and Abu Dhabi.
- VDAA (Véhicule d'Auto-Defense Antiaèrienne) – Anti-aircraft version with turret carrying two 20 mm cannon. Nine purchased by Oman National Guard.
- VDAA SANTAL (Véhicule de Défense Anti-Aérienne, Systeme Anti-aerien Autonome Leger) – Anti-aircraft version using the SANTAL turret system, fitted with six Mistral short-range surface-to-air missiles and the Rodeo-2 radar.

The French Gendarmerie also procured a small batch (about twenty) of up-armoured VABs, for use in Afghanistan. These vehicles have now (2018) been redeployed either to Versailles-Satory (near Paris) or to French New Caledonia.

Foreign-made versions:

- MACK Lakota: A variant of the VAB Mark III, most of its parts made in America by Mack Defense via JWF Defense Systems in 6x6 and 8x8 variants, which was announced in June 2016. It was first shown publicly in AUSA 2014 and AUSA 2015. Its hull is also assembled in America. It was sold in 2016 to an unnamed customer in the Middle East. In May 2024, Shepard Media reported that these APCs were provided to Saudi Arabia and Tunisia.

== Operators ==
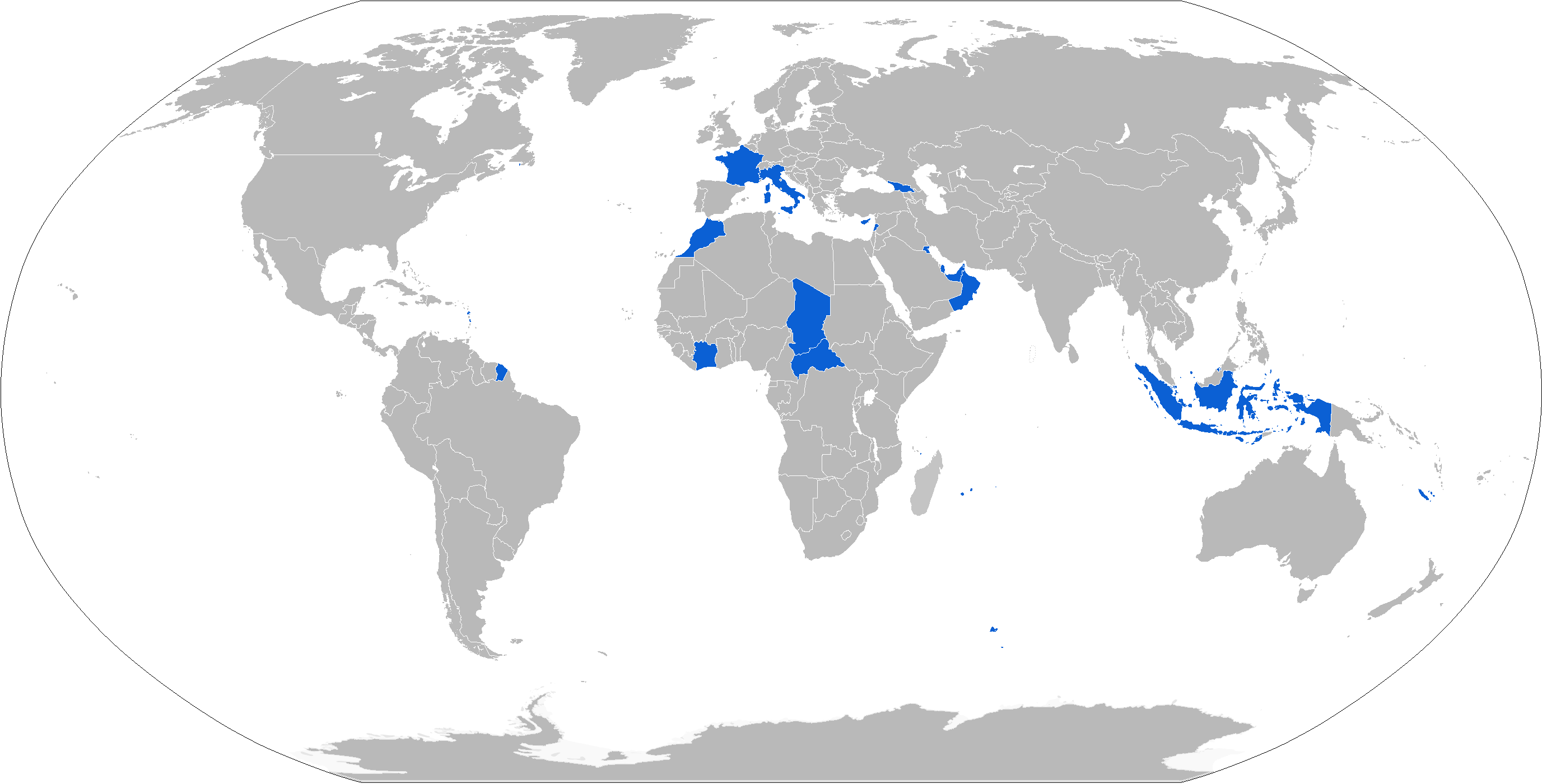
Map of VAB operators in blue

As of 2019, it's known that the VAB is exported to more than 40 countries.

=== Current operators ===
- France:
  - French Army: 3,900 VAB in 35 different versions
  - French Air Force (VIB, véhicule blindé d'intervention, or véhicule d'intervention sur base)
- Benin: Beninese military received 8 out of 15 VABs on March 15, 2023.
- Brunei: To be phased out once Pindad Anoas are purchased instead of originally contracting Pindad to retrofit them.
- Central African Republic: 10
- Chad: 25; around 40 VABs given by the French Army in 2008
- Cyprus: A total of 147
- Gabon: 5
- Indonesia
- Italy 15 vehicles CBRN variant.
- Ivory Coast: 13
- Kuwait
- Lebanon: Lebanese Armed Forces, Internal Security Forces (Police)
- Morocco: 400 vehicles
- Oman
- Saudi Arabia: Announced that 100 VAB Mk 3s would be taken to service in 2016, which was supposed to be supplied to Lebanon. In May 2024, these APCs were reported to be made by MACK Defense.
- Tunisia: In May 2024, VAB Mk 3 APCs were reported to be made by MACK Defense for them.
- United Arab Emirates
- Ukraine: French Ministry of Armed Forces announced in June 2022 that "significant quantities" of armed VAB will be delivered to Ukraine as part of France's military aid in the context of 2022 Russian invasion of Ukraine. In February 2024, 250 units were reported to have been provided by France.

=== Former operators ===
- Amal Movement militia (1984–1990)
- Georgia: the Georgian security company of Camp Warehouse, as part of the ISAF, used VAB loaned by the French Army in the Kabul area in 2009–2011.

=== Potential operators ===
- Armenia: There have been reports of Armenia acquiring 50 VAB Mk 3s alongside GM200 radars and Bastion armored vehicles in November 2023.

== Gallery ==
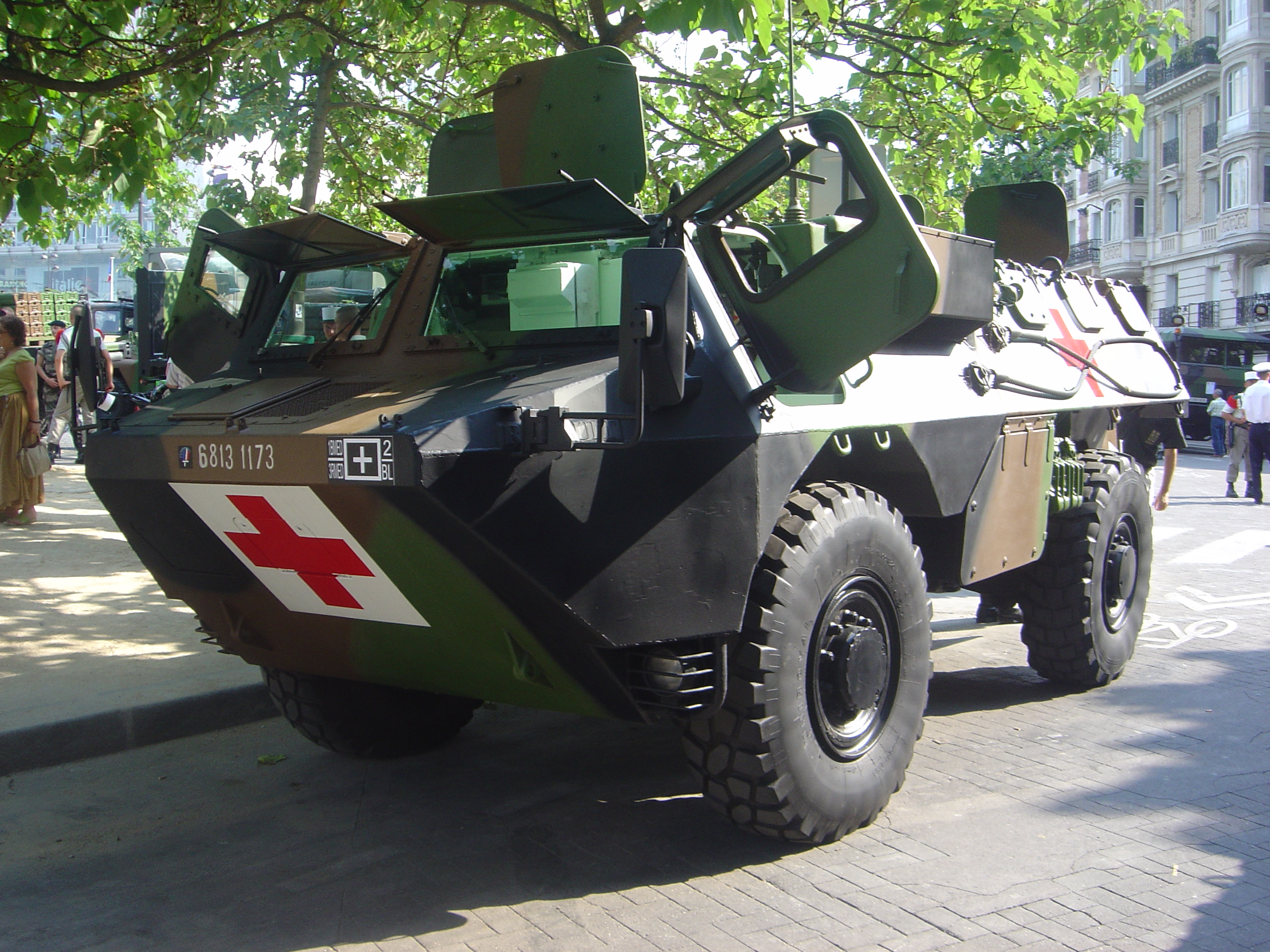
Medical evacuation version

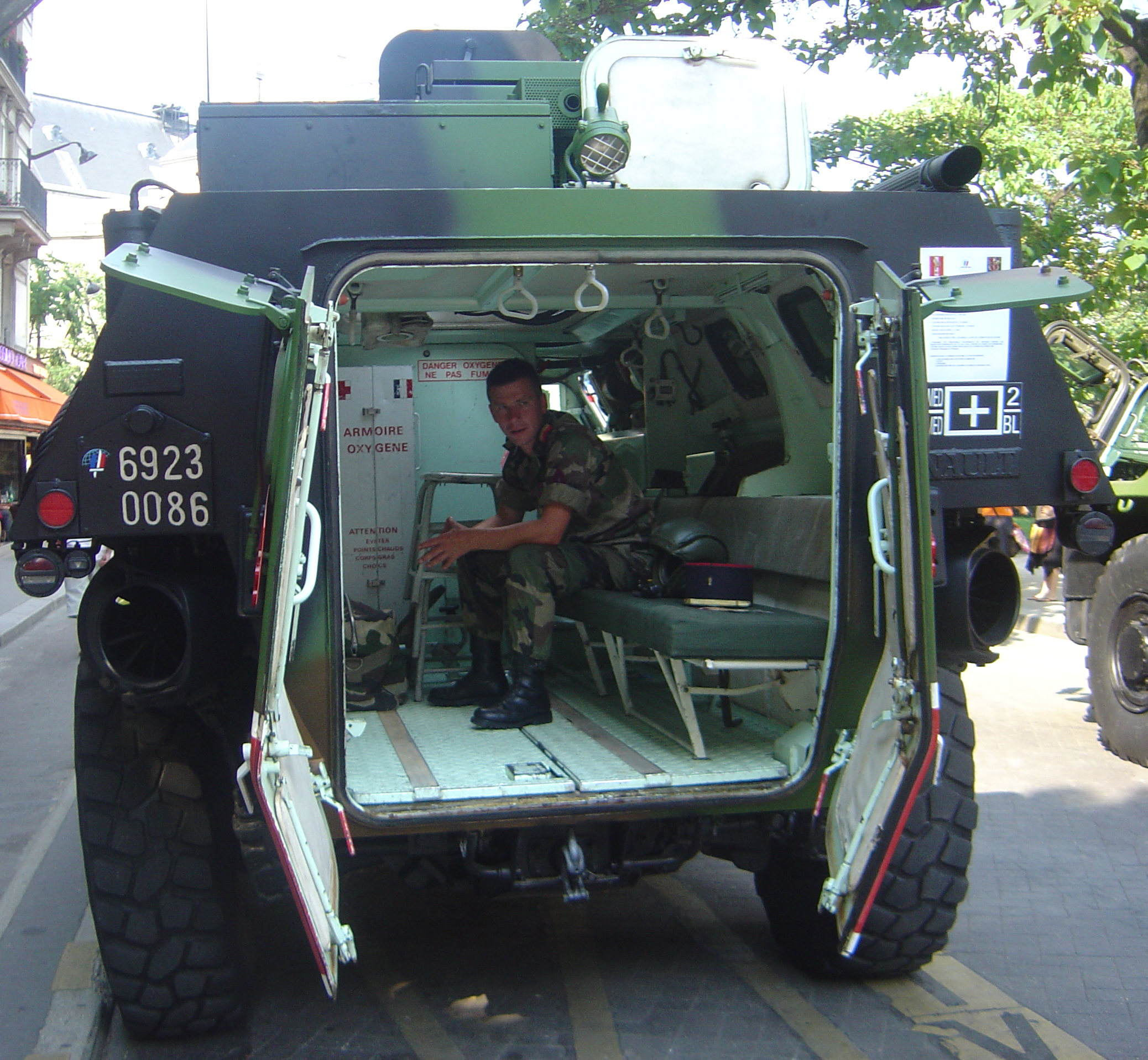
Inside view of the medical evacuation version

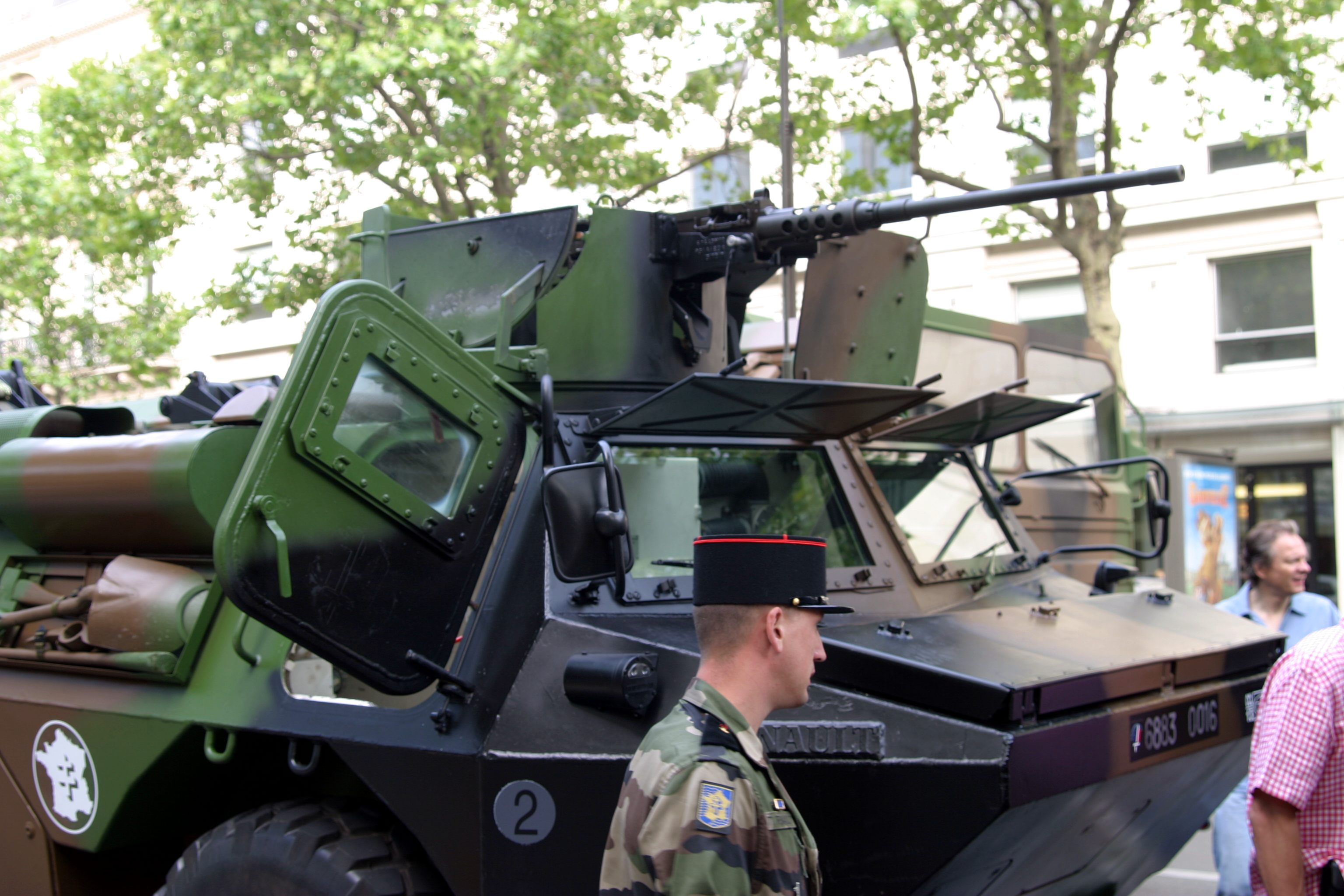
Version with 12.7 mm machine gun

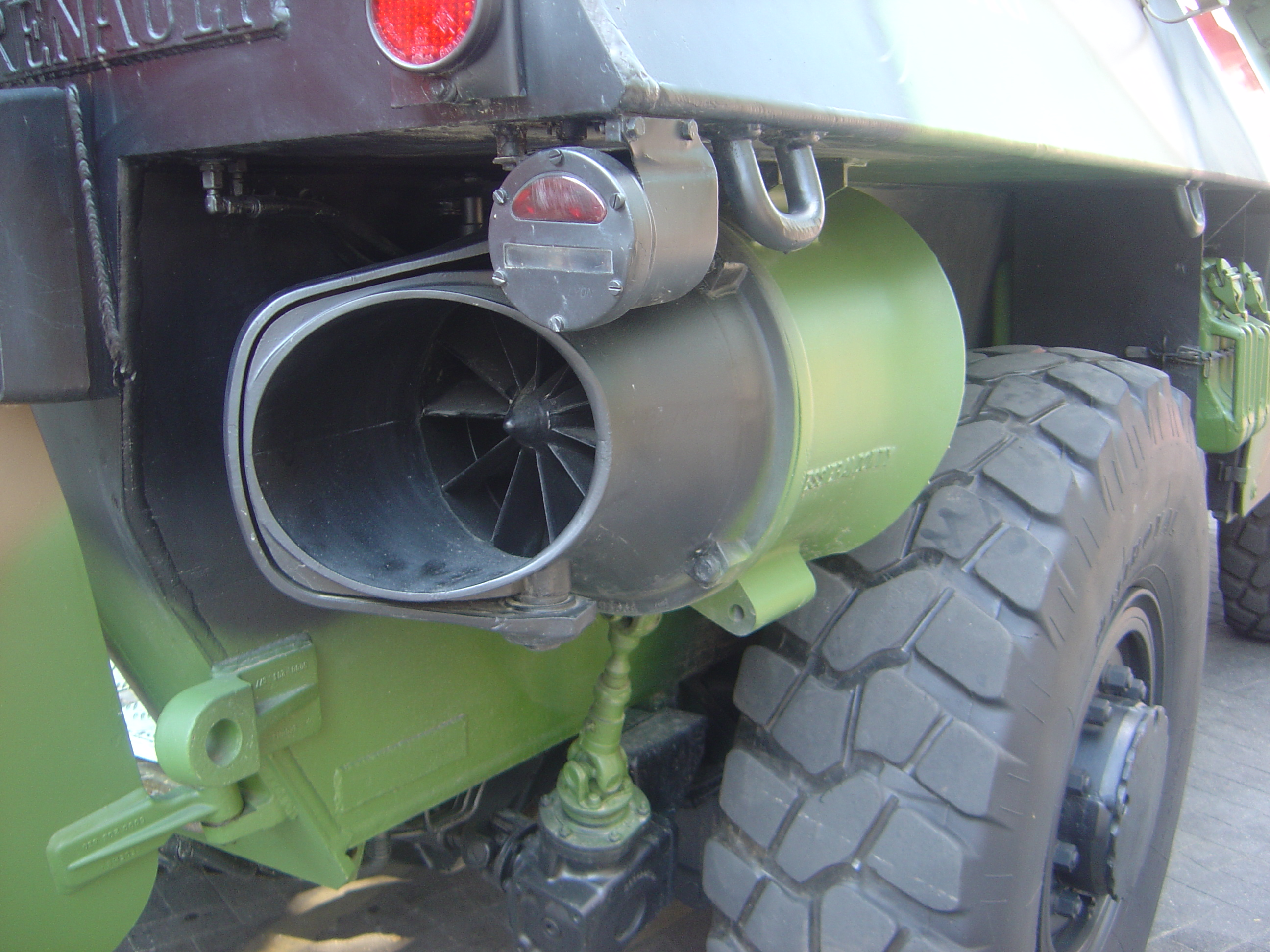
Detail of Pod Water Jet for amphibious operation

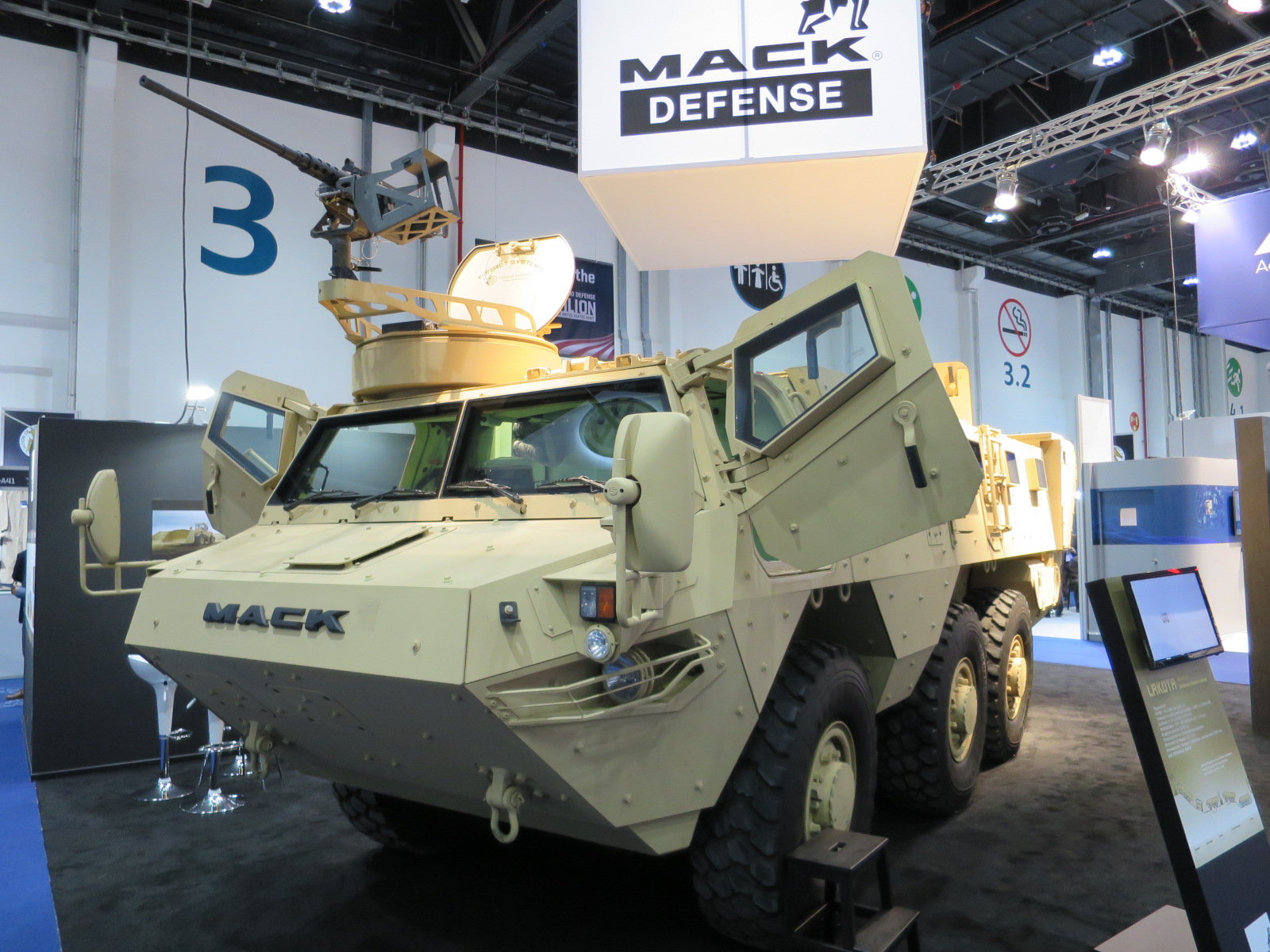
MACK Lakota at IDEX 2017

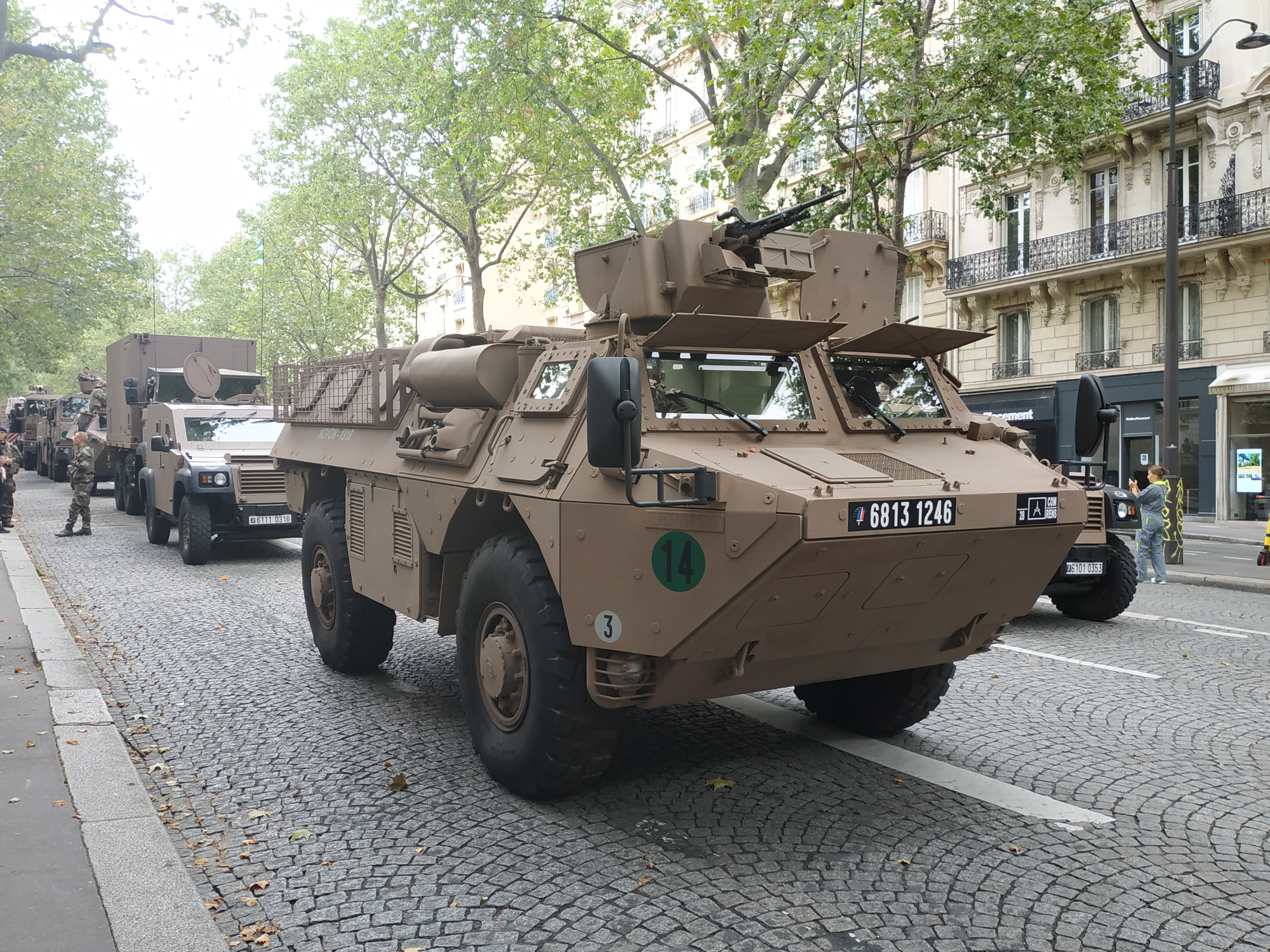
French Army VAB in the new camouflage, spotted after the Bastille Day parade (July 14, 2021)

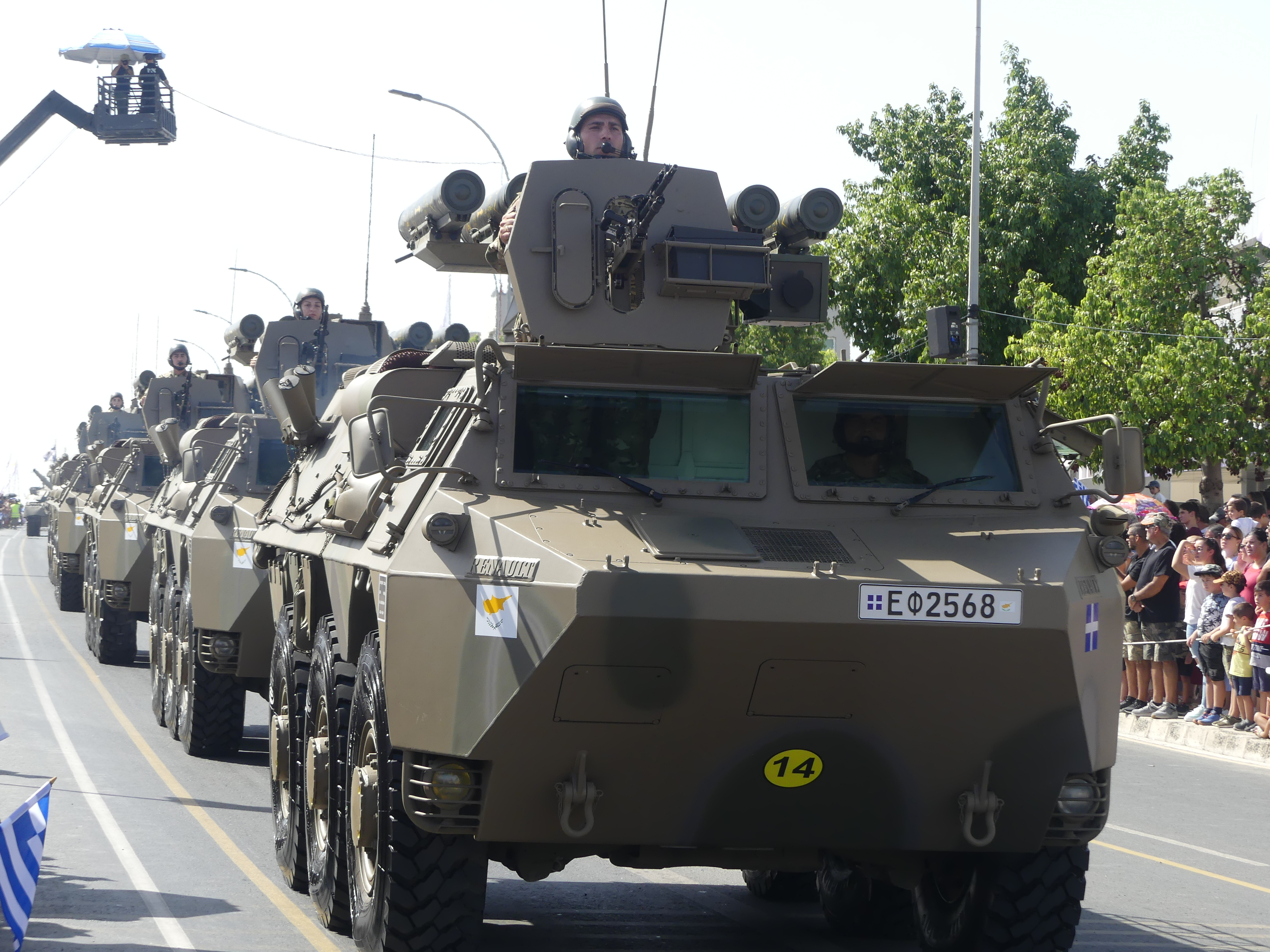
VAB-VCACs of the Cypriot National Guard during a parade in Nicosia.

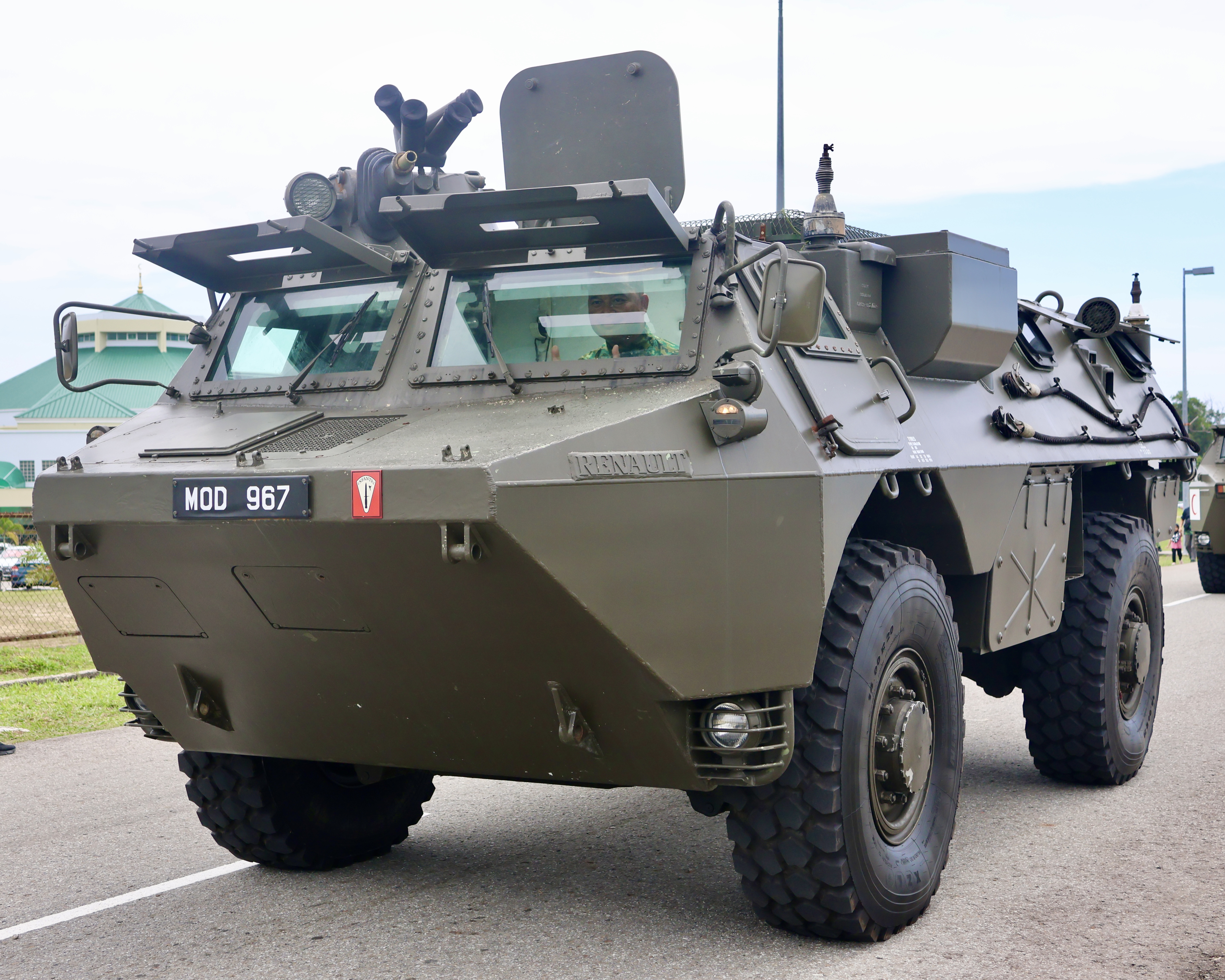
VAB in service with the Royal Brunei Land Forces (RBAF) in 2024

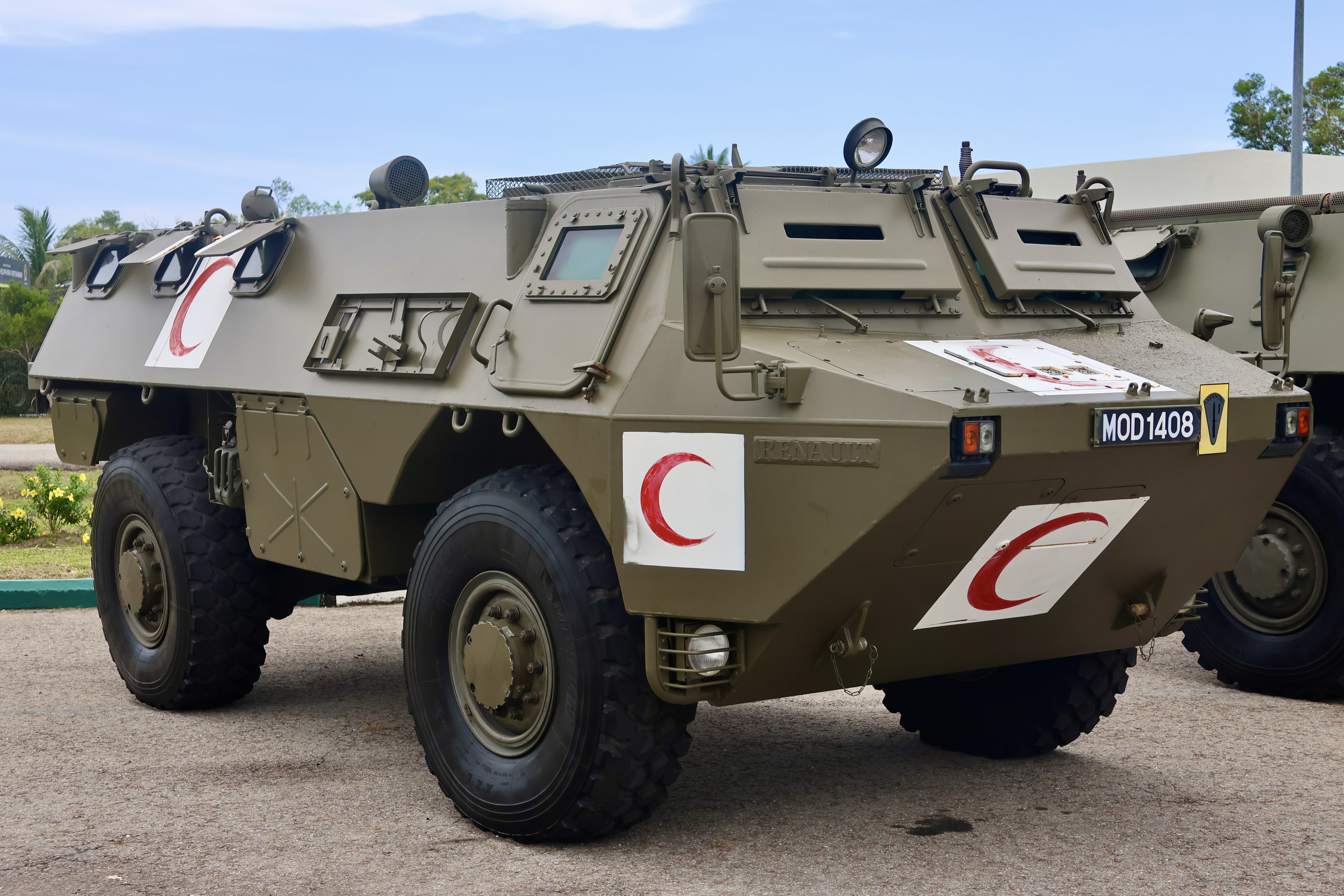
VAB medical evacuation vehicle in service with the RBAF in 2024

== See also ==
=== Comparable vehicles ===
- WZ551 – (China)
- Anoa (armoured personnel carrier) – (Indonesia)
- Patria Pasi – (Finland)
- TPz Fuchs – (West Germany)
