= Armoured Multirole Carrier =

- Type: Armoured personnel carrier
- Place of origin: France

Production history
- Manufacturer: Renault Trucks Défense

Specifications
- Mass: 18–23 t (18–23 long tons)
- Length: 6.3 m (20 ft 8 in)
- Width: 2.55 m (8 ft 4 in)
- Height: 2.2 m (7 ft 3 in)
- Crew: 3
- Passengers: 8-10 fully equipped troops
- Engine: 6-cylinder Renault DXi 11 diesel engine 370 hp (280 kW) or 460 hp (340 kW)
- Payload capacity: 6.5 t (6.4 long tons)
- Operational range: 750 km (470 mi)

The Armoured Multirole Carrier (AMC) is an eight-wheeled armoured personnel carrier designed by Renault Trucks Défense, part of Renault Trucks. A concept model was put on display for the first time at Eurosatory 2008. It is one of the contenders to replace the VAB, also made by Renault, around 2020, as part of "Project Scorpion", a large-scale military modernization programme.

The AMC is a high-mobility medium armoured vehicle. A wide range of different models is planned, including six-wheel drive variants.

== Versions ==
- Armoured transport
- Infantry combat vehicle
- Troop transport
- Mobile command centre (AMC-PC)
- Ambulance (AMC-SAN)
- HOT launcher (AMC-HOT)
- Anti-air missile launcher
- Mortar truck
- Artillery observation
- NBC reconnaissance
- Decontamination centre
- Minesweeper
- 20mm turret AMC
