= List of equipment of the Japan Ground Self-Defense Force =

The following is a list of equipment currently in service with the Japan Ground Self-Defense Force.

== Soldier equipment and clothing ==
=== Camouflage patterns ===
Images	Model	Origin	Pattern type	Environment / colours	User	Period use	Notes
	Type II camouflage	Japan	Flecktarn	Temperate	JGSDF, JMSDF, Japan National Defense Academy cadets, JASDF Air Rescue Wings Pararescuemen	Since 1991	Second domestically designed pattern. The earlier model had anti-IR/flame-resistant fabric, but the latter lacks the feature.
	Type II brown-dominant winter pattern	Japan	Flecktarn	Temperate / dark	JGSDF	Since 1991	Darker contrast on Type II Flecktarn camo to fit the color of winter plants. Used on JGSDF Type-2 Camouflage Cold Weather Field Parka and Trousers.
	Type III camouflage	Japan	Flecktarn	Temperate	JGSDF	Since 2007	Modified from ''Type II'' pattern.
	JGSDF Desert camouflage	Japan	Flecktarn	Arid / desert	JGSDF International Peace Cooperation Activities Training Unit and JGSDF Central Readiness Force	Since June 2010	Adopted by the JGSDF for Middle Eastern deployments.

=== Protection ===
Image	Model	Japan designation	Origin	Type	Notes
Combat helmet
	PASGT helmet	Type 88 helmet	Japan	Combat helmet (Kevlar)	Standard issue helmet. Successor of the Type 66 helmet.
	MICH	–	Japan	Combat helmet (Kevlar)	Large amount. Successor of the Type 88 helmet.
	M1 Helmet	Type 66 helmet	Japan	Combat helmet (iron alloy)	Entered service in 1966, it remains in use for non-combat missions, training exercises, parades and in the reserve forces. Largely replaced by the Type 88 helmet.
	Ops-Core FAST	–	United States	Combat helmet (UHMWPE material)	Used by special units.
Body armour
	PASGT	Type 1 bulletproof vest	Japan; United States	Bulletproof vest	First body armour fully introduced by the JGSDF in 1992. Derived from the [[Personnel Armor System for Ground Troops|PASGT]].
	–	Type 2 bulletproof vest	Japan	Bulletproof vest	Successor of the Type 1 bulletproof vest. The camouflage is the Type II.
	–	Type 3 bulletproof vest	Japan	Bulletproof vest	Successor to the Type 2 bulletproof vest. Procured with the fiscal year 2012 budget.
	–	Type 18 Armoured Vest System	Japan	Bulletproof vest	Successor to the Type 3 bulletproof vest. Procured with the fiscal year 2023 budget.

=== Electronic equipment ===
Image	Model	Japan designation	Origin	Type	Quantity	Notes
	AN/PVS-14	JGVS-V8 / JGVS-V8 B	United States / Japan	Personal night vision device / GaAS visible light amplification 3^{rd} generation	> 22,942	License produced by NEC. Successor JGVS-V3.

== Infantry weapons ==
=== Standard issue weapons ===
Image	Model	Japan designation	Origin	Type	Calibre	Notes
Handguns
	SIG Sauer P220	Minebea P9	West Germany; Switzerland; Japan	Semi-automatic pistol	9×19mm Parabellum	Standard issue as of 1982, and currently being replaced. Made under license by Minebea.
	H&K SFP9-M	–	Germany	Semi-automatic pistol	9×19mm Parabellum	Successor of the SIG P220 as new standard issue pistol, introduced in 2020. Purchases: 303 in 2022; 297 in 2021; 323 in 2020
Submachine guns
	Minebea PM-9	M9	Japan	Submachine gun	9×19mm Parabellum	Successor of the Uzi, and also derived from it. Introduced in 1999.
Assault rifles and battle rifles
	Howa Type 20	Type 20 assault rifle	Japan	Assault rifle	5.56×45mm NATO	New service rifle succeeding to the Howa Type 89 and the Howa Type 64. The grenade launcher selected for the Type 20 is the Beretta GLX160. 38,057 ordered for the JGSDF from 2020 to 2025, 10,000 planned with the 2026 budget. (2,909 more for the JASDF and the JMSDF).
	Howa Type 89	Type 89 assault rifle	Japan	Assault rifle	5.56×45mm NATO	Service rifle that entered service in 1989. Complemented the Howa Type 64 battle rifles. Being replaced by the Howa Type 20.
	Howa Type 64	Type 64 battle rifle	Japan	Battle rifle	7.62×51mm NATO	Service rifle that entered service in 1964. Being replaced by the Howa Type 20.
Machine guns
	FN Minimi	5.56mm Machine Gun MINIMI	Belgium; Japan	LMG	5.56×45mm NATO	Standard squad-level machine gun. First order in 1993, succeeded to the Type 62 machine gun. 4,922 ordered by 2017. Made under license by Sumitomo.
	FN Minimi MK3	5.56mm Machine Gun MINIMI(B)	Belgium	LMG	5.56×45mm NATO	Successor of the Gen 1 Minimi. Selected in a competition against the HK MG4. 3,100 planned to be purchased. 514 ordered in 2024.
	Sumitomo Type 62	Type 62 7.62mm machine gun	Japan	GPMG	7.62×51mm NATO	Mostly replaced, but remains in service for infantry support.
	Sumitomo Type 74	Type 74 vehicle-mounted 7.62mm machine gun	Japan	GPMG - vehicle based	7.62×51mm NATO	Fixed-mount variant of the Type 62 used specifically for armoured fighting vehicles.
	M2 Browning	J2 12.7mm Heavy Machine Gun	United States; Japan	HMG	12.7×99mm NATO (.50 BMG)	Made under license by Sumitomo.
Precision rifles
	Howa Type 64	Type 64 7.62mm sniper rifle	Japan	Semi-automatic DMR	7.62×51mm NATO	
	M24 A2 Sniper Rifle	M24 7.62mm sniper rifle	United States	Bolt action DMR	7.62×51mm NATO	Made by Remington Arms. Introduced to the JSDF in 2002, it is used by snipers, the 1st Airborne Brigade and Special Forces Group. A total of 1,304 M24A2 guns were purchased by the JGSDF. Being replaced by the HK417.
	Heckler & Koch HK417 - G28E2	–	Germany	Semi-automatic DMR	7.62×51mm NATO	Successor of the M24 A2. The intention to purchase a total of 900 of these rifles. 182 ordered in 2024 for $6.88 million.
Grenades / grenade launchers
	M67 fragmentation grenade	–	United States	Hand grenade	–	
	–	Type 06 rifle grenade	Japan	HEAT rifle grenade	–	Made by Daikin since 2006. The rifle can be used with both the Type 64 and the Type 89 rifles.
	Beretta GLX 160	–	Italy	Under-barrel grenade launcher	40×46mm LV	Selected to equip the Type 20 rifles.
	Howa Type 96	Type 96 40mm automatic grenade launcher	Japan	AGL	40×56mm	First entered service in 1996. It is a blow forward weapon and is used in both infantry and vehicle roles.
Man-portable anti-tank systems
	Carl Gustaf M2	Howa 84RR / 84 mm Recoilless Rifle	Sweden; Japan	Recoilless rifle	84×246mmR	Around 2,700 delivered between 1978 and 1990. Made under licence by Howa.
	Carl Gustaf M4	–	Sweden	Recoilless rifle	84×246mmR	300 ordered in 2023.
	Panzerfaust 3	Nissan 110mm LAM / 110mm personal anti-tank round	West Germany; Japan	Anti-tank rocket launcher	110mm	Contract signed in 1989. Made under license by Nissan/IHI Aerospace.
	Type 79 Jyu-MAT	Type 79 anti-landing craft anti-tank missile (ATM-2)	Japan	Heavy ATGM	153mm	Used against tank and landing craft. Built by Kawasaki.
	Type 87 Chu-MAT	Type 87 anti-tank guided missile (ATM-3)	Japan	ATGM	110mm	Laser guided missile. Built by Kawasaki.
	Type 01 LMAT	Type 01 light anti-tank guided missile (ATM-5)	Japan	Fire-and-forget ATGM	140mm	Built by Kawasaki.
Mines
	M18 Claymore mine	–	United States	Directional fragmentation anti-personnel mine	–	Can be detonated either by tripwire or remote control.

=== Special forces use ===
Image	Model	Origin	Type	Calibre	Notes
Handguns
	H&K USP	Germany	Semi-automatic pistol	9×19mm Parabellum	Only Japanese Special Forces Group.
Submachine guns
	H&K MP5	West Germany	Submachine gun	9×19mm Parabellum	Only Japanese Special Forces Group.
	H&K MP7	Germany	PDW	4.6×30mm HK	Only Japanese Special Forces Group.
Assault rifles and battle rifles
	M4 carbine	United States	Assault rifle	5.56×45mm NATO	Only Japanese Special Forces Group.
	FN SCAR-L	Belgium	Assault rifle	5.56×45mm NATO	Only Japanese Special Forces Group.
	Heckler & Koch G36	Germany	Assault rifle	5.56×45mm NATO	Only Japanese Special Forces Group.
	Heckler & Koch HK416	Germany	Assault rifle	5.56×45mm NATO	
	HK417	Germany	Battle rifle	7.62×51mm NATO	Being acquired for the JGSDF as the G28.
Grenades / grenade launchers
	M203 grenade launcher	United States	Underbarrel grenade launcher	40×46mm LV	Used by the Special Forces Group alongside the M4 carbine.
	Milkor MGL - M32A1	South Africa	Rotary grenade launcher	40×46mm LV	
Man-portable anti-tank systems
	M72 LAW	Norway; United States	Disposable anti-tank rocket launcher	66mm	

=== Weapon accessories ===
Image	Model	Origin	Type	Used with	Quantity	Notes
	Deon MARCH-F Compact 1x-8x24	Japan	Telescopic sight	Howa Type 89; Howa Type 20; FN Minimi	–	–
	Aimpoint M5B	Sweden	Red dot holographic sight	Howa Type 20	–	–
	EOTech EXPS3	United States	Red dot holographic sight	Howa Type 20	–	–

== Indirect fire ==
=== Mortars ===
Image	Model	Japan designation	Origin	Type	Calibre	Quantity	Notes
Mortars
	Hirtenberger M6C-640T	–	Austria	Light mortar	60mm	–	
	L16 81mm Mortar	–	United Kingdom; Japan	Mortar	81mm	–	Built under license with the ordnance by Howa. The procurement took place from the early 1990s to 2018. It succeeds to the Type 64 mortar.
	MO-120 RT a a a	–	France; Japan	Heavy rifled towed mortar	120mm	504	Built under license with the ordnance by Howa. 504 MO-120 RT acquired from 1992 to 2023. It succeeds to the M2 107 mm mortar.
Self-propelled mortar
	–	Type 96 120 mm self-propelled mortar	Japan; France	Mortar carrier	120mm	24	The mortar barrel used on the Type 96 is the MO-120 RT. The chassis used is based on the Type 92 minefield clearing vehicle. It succeeded to the Type 60 107 mm self-propelled mortar.
Future self-propelled mortars
	CTWV mortar carrier	Type 24 Mobile 120 mm Mortar	Japan; France	Wheeled armoured mortar carrier	120mm	0 (+ 24 on order)	Equipped with the Thales 2R2M. Orders: 1 prototype in 2019.; 8 in 2024; 8 in 2025; 8 in 2026
–	–	–	Japan; France	Tracked armoured mortar carrier	120mm	–	Successor of the Type 96 120 mm self-propelled mortar in development. To be equipped with the Thales 2R2M. To be based on the chassis of the successor of the Mitsubishi Type 89.

=== Howitzers ===
Image	Model	Japan designation	Origin	Type	Calibre	Quantity	Notes
Towed howitzer
	FH-70	155mm howitzer	United Kingdom; West Germany; Italy; Japan	Towed howitzer	155 mm L/39	480	Total of 480 built as of 2008. Built under license with the ordnance by Japan Steel Works.
Self-propelled howitzers
	–	Type 99 155 mm Self-propelled Howitzer	Japan	Self-propelled howitzer	155 mm L/52	135	Artillery system made by Japan Steel Works, chassis from Mitsubishi Heavy Industries.
	–	Type 19 155 mm	Japan; Germany	Wheeled self-propelled howitzer	155 mm L/52	58	Artillery system made by Japan Steel Works, chassis from RMMV with the HX2 truck. Up to 200 planned to be purchased eventually Current orders: 7 in 2019; 7 in 2020; 7 in 2021; 7 in 2022; 16 in 2024; 14 in 2025
Artillery support
	–	Type 99 ammunition supply vehicle	Japan	Ammunition resupply vehicle	–	18	Equipped with a conveyor belt to resupply the Type 99. It can hold 90 155mm rounds. Manufactured by Hitachi Heavy Industries.18 are known to have been made between 2000 and 2019.
	–	Medium gun towing vehicle	Japan	Artillery tow truck	–	–	

=== Rocket artillery ===
Image	Model	Japan designation	Origin	Type	Quantity	Notes
	M270 MLRS	–	United States; Japan	MLRS	99	Made under licence by IHI. M270 purchased between 1992 and 2004. Expected to be retired in 2029.

== Vehicle ==
=== Armoured vehicles ===
==== Armoured fighting vehicles ====
Image	Model	Japan designation	Origin	Type	Quantity	Notes
Tank / fire support vehicles
	–	Type 10	Japan	MBT	139 (ordered as of 2025)	Built by MHI. Weapons: Tank gun: JSW 120 (120 mm L/44); Coaxial MG: Type 74 (7.62×51mm NATO); Pintle MG: M2 Browning (12.7×99mm NATO)
	–	Type 90	Japan	MBT	340	Built by MHI until 2009. Weapons: Tank gun: JSW / Rh-120 L44 (120 mm); Coaxial MG: Type 74 (7.62×51mm NATO); Pintle MG: M2 Browning (12.7×99mm NATO)
	–	Type 16 MCV	Japan	Fire support vehicle	255 (ordered as of 2025)	Built by MHI. Weapons: Tank gun: JSW 105 (105 mm L/52); Coaxial MG: Type 74 (7.62×51mm NATO); Pintle MG: M2 Browning (12.7×99mm NATO)
Infantry fighting vehicles / reconnaissance vehicles
	–	Type 89 IFV	Japan	IFV	70	Built by MHI. Ordered between 1989 and 2004. Weapons: Autocannon: Oerlikon KDE (35×228mm); ATGM: 2 × Type 79 Jyu-MAT; Coaxial MG: Type 74 (7.62×51mm NATO)
	–	Type 87 RCV	Japan	Reconnaissance vehicle	111	Built by Komatsu. Based on the chassis of the Type 82 Command and Communication Vehicle. Ordered between 1987 and 2013. Weapons: Autocannon: Oerlikon KBA (25×137mm); Coaxial MG: Type 74 (7.62×51mm NATO)
Tank destroyers
	–	Type 96 MPMS	Japan	Anti-tank vehicle / anti-landing craft vehicle	37	Built by Kawasaki. Ordered between 1996 and 2011. Equipped with 6 × ATM-4 HATM (long range fibre optic guided heavy ATGM).
	–	Chū-MPMS	Japan	Anti-tank vehicle / anti-landing craft vehicle	119	Built by MHI and Komatsu. Ordered between 2009 and 2020. Equipped with 6 × ATM-6 MPM-MR ATGM.
Future armoured fighting vehicles
–	–	Tracked IFV NG	Japan	IFV	–	New platform in development to replace the Mitsubishi Type 89 IFV.
–	–	Type 24 ICV	Japan	IFV	0 (+ 42 on order)	Platform: CTWV. Total planned of 150 vehicles. Orders: 1 prototype (budget 2019); 24 (budget 2024); 18 (budget 2025); Weapons: Autocannon: Mk44 Bushmaster II (30×173mm); Coaxial MG: Mk52 Bushmaster (7.62mm NATO)
	–	Type 25 RCV	Japan	Reconnaissance vehicle	0 (+ 24 on order)	Platform: CTWV. Total planned of 120 vehicles. Orders: 1 prototype (budget 2019); 6 (budget 2025); 18 (budget 2026); Weapons: Autocannon: Mk44 Bushmaster II chain gun (30×173mm); Coaxial MG: Mk52 Bushmaster (7.62mm NATO)
–	–	MPMS Kai	Japan	Anti-tank vehicle / anti-landing craft vehicle	0 (+ 42 on order)	Successor of the Type 96 MPMS. Orders: 11 (budget 2026)

==== Amphibious assault vehicles ====
Image	Model	Japan designation	Origin	Type	Quantity	Notes
	AAV-7A1	AAVP7A1 RAM/RS	United States	Amphibious APC	46	Imported from BAE Systems. Equipped with a UGWS weapons station armed with: HMG: M2 Browning (12.7×99mm NATO); AGL: Mk19 (40×53mm HV)
	AAV-7A1	AAVC7A1 RAM/RS	United States	Amphibious C2 vehicle	6	Imported from BAE Systems.
	AAV-7A1	AAVR7A1 RAM/RS	United States	Amphibious ARV	6	Imported from BAE Systems.

==== Multi-role armoured vehicles ====
Image	Model	Japan designation	Origin	Type	Quantity	Notes
Personnel carriers
	–	Type 73 APC	Japan	APC	338	Built by MHI and by Komatsu. Manufactured in 1973, entered service in 1974. Weapon mounted on a pintle mount: Pintle MG: M2 Browning (12.7×99mm NATO)
	–	Type 96 wheeled APC	Japan	APC	381	Built by Komatsu. Procured from 1996 and 2016. Being replaced by the Patria AMV^{XP}. Weapons on a pintle mount: HMG: M2 Browning (12.7×99mm NATO), or; AGL: Howa Type 96 (40×56mm)
	Patria AMV^{XP}	–	Japan; Finland	APC	1 (+ 82 on order)	Licence production by Japan Steel Works. 810 planned in total as the Type 96 replacement. Procurement: 28 (2025 budget); 28 (2024 budget); 26 (2023 budget)
	Komatsu LAV	–	Japan	IMV, armoured car	1,818	Built from 2002 to 2019. 1,818 ordered by the 2015 budget. Exists in multiple variants, some with weapons on a pintle mount, such as: HMG M2 Browning (12.7×99mm NATO), or; GPMG M249 (7.62×51mm NATO), or; ATGM: Type 87 Chu-MAT, or; ATGM: Type 01 LMAT; Vehicles planned to eventually be replaced by the Mowag Eagle V or the Thales Hawkei.
	Bushmaster Protected Mobility Vehicle	–	Australia	IMV, MRAP	8	Built by Thales Australia. Used by the CRR in case of emergency evacuation of Japanese citizens needed. Purchases: 4 in 2014; 4 in 2016
Command vehicles
	–	Type 82 Command and Communication Vehicle	Japan	C2 armoured vehicle	231	Built by Komatsu. Delivered between 1982 and 1999. Weapons on a pintle mount: HMG: M2 Browning (12.7×99mm NATO), or; GPMG Type 62 (7.62×51mm NATO)
Future personnel carriers
–	–	–	Japan	Tracked APC	–	New tracked platform in development to replace the Type 73 armored personnel carrier.
	–	Mowag Eagle V	Japan; Switzerland	IMV, MRAP	1	Ongoing selection of the Komatsu LAV successor. Around 2,000 to be produced under licence: MHI for the Hawkei; Marubeni Aerospace
	–	Thales Hawkei	Japan; Australia	IMV, MRAP	1	Ongoing selection of the Komatsu LAV successor. Around 2,000 to be produced under licence: MHI for the Hawkei; Marubeni Aerospace

==== Engineering equipment ====
Image	Model	Japan designation	Base vehicle	Origin	Type	Quantity	Notes
Recovery vehicles
	–	Type 11 ARV	Type 10 tank	Japan	ARV	4	Built by MHI.
	–	Type 90 ARV	Type 90 tank	Japan	ARV	30	Built by MHI.
	–	Type 78 ARV	Type 74 tank	Japan	ARV	36	Built by MHI.
Engineering vehicles
	–	Facility work vehicle	Hitachi Type 73	Japan	AEV	13	Built by Komatsu.
–	–	Type 23 Bulldozer	–	Japan	Armoured bulldozer	–	Procured in 2023. Successor of the Type 75 dozer.
Demining vehicles
	–	Type 92 minefield processing roller	Type 90 tank / Type 74 tank	Japan	Mine roller	–	Roller to equip the Type 74 / 90 tank. Built by MHI.
	–	Type 92 MCV	Hitachi Type 73	Japan	MCV	–	Equipped with 2 line charges.
Bridging vehicles
	–	Type 91 AVLB	Type 74 tank	Japan	AVLB	22	Built by MHI.
Nuclear, biological, and/or chemical reconnaissance vehicles
	–	Chemical Reconnaissance Vehicle	Type 82	Japan	Chemical reconnaissance vehicle	34	Built by Komatsu.
	–	NBC reconnaissance car	Type 96 APC	Japan	CBRN reconnaissance vehicle Chemical, biological, radiological and nuclear	21	Built by Komatsu. Developed from 2005 to 2009, procured in 2010.

=== Unarmoured vehicles ===
==== Light and tactical vehicles ====
Image	Model	Japan designation	Origin	Type	Quantity	Notes
Light armoured fighting vehicle
	Toyota Mega Cruiser	High-mobility vehicle	Japan	AFV	–	Built by Toyota. Production ceased in 2001. Used in multiple variants. Examples: Tow 120mm mortar; Infantry mobility; Armed with machine guns
Utility vehicles
	–	Mitsubishi Type 73 Light Truck 1st generation	Japan	4×4 utility vehicle	–	Production ceased in 1997, based on the Jeep CJ-3B.
	–	Mitsubishi Type 73 Light Truck 2nd generation	Japan	4×4 utility vehicle	–	Built since 1996, based on the Mitsubishi Pajero.
Motorcycles
	Kawasaki KLX250	–	Japan	Scout motorcycle	–	

==== Logistics vehicles ====
Image	Model	Japan designation	Origin	Type	Quantity	Notes
Tactical trucks
	–	Toyota Type 73 medium truck	Japan	4×4 tactical truck	–	Built by Toyota. Used specifically for transport purposes.
Heavy trucks
	–	Isuzu Type 73 heavy truck	Japan	Heavy truck	–	Built by Isuzu.
	Mitsubishi Fuso Super Great (FW)	Mitsubishi Fuso Type 74 extra-large truck	Japan	Heavy truck	–	Built by Mitsubishi Fuso (formerly Mitsubishi Motors)
Semi-trucks
	Mitsubishi Fuso Super Great (FW Tractor-type)	Mitsubishi Fuso Type 73 semi-trailer truck	Japan	Semi-truck	–	Built by Mitsubishi Fuso (formerly Mitsubishi Motors)

== Air defence ==
=== Short range air defence ===
==== Anti-air cannons ====
Image	Japan designation	Base vehicle	Origin	Type	Range	Quantity	Notes
	Type 87 SPAAG	Type 74 tank.	Japan	Self-propelled anti-aircraft gun	75 km (40 nmi)	52	Built by Mitsubishi. It uses 2 × Oerlikon KDA autocannons (35×228mm).

==== Man portable air-defence ====
Image	Model	Origin	Type	Range	Quantity	Notes
	Type 91 portable surface-to-air missile	Japan	Man-portable air-defense system	5 km (2.7 nmi)	–	Built by Toshiba.
	FIM-92A Stinger	United States	Man-portable air-defense system	5.5 km (3.0 nmi)	–	

=== Missile systems ===
Image	Model	Japan designation	Origin	Type	Quantity	Notes
Short range air-defence missile systems
	–	Type 81 short-range surface-to-air missile	Japan	Surface-to-air missile system	84	Built by Toshiba.
	–	Type 93 short-range surface-to-air missile	Japan	Surface-to-air missile system	90	Built by Toshiba.
	–	Type 11 short-range surface-to-air missile	Japan	Surface-to-air missile system	22	Built by Toshiba.
Medium range air defence missile systems
	Improved-HAWK	–	United States; Japan	Surface-to-air missile system	–	Made under license by Mitsubishi / Toshiba.
	–	Type 03 medium-range surface-to-air missile	Japan	Surface-to-air missile system	–	Built by Mitsubishi / Toshiba.

== Coastal defence ==
Image	Model	Japan designation	Origin	Type	Quantity	Notes
–	–	Type 25 Hyper Velocity Gliding Projectile	Japan	Anti-ship missile	–	Built by Mitsubishi.
	–	Type 25 surface-to-ship missile	Japan	Anti-ship missile	–	Built by Mitsubishi.
	–	Type 12 surface-to-ship missile	Japan	Anti-ship missile	–	Built by Mitsubishi.
	–	Type 88 surface-to-ship missile	Japan	Anti-ship missile	–	Built by Mitsubishi.

== Aircraft ==
=== Fixed wings aircraft ===
Image	Model	Japan designation	Origin	Role	Quantity	Notes
	Beechcraft Super King Air B300	LR-2	United States	Reconnaissance and communications	8	

=== Rotary wings aircraft ===
Image	Model	Japan designation	Origin	Type / role	Quantity	Notes
Attack rotary-wing aircraft
	Bell AH-1 Cobra	AH-1S	United States; Japan	Ground attack	71	Built by Fuji under licence from Bell. Fleet starting to be retired. Weapons: ATGM: BGM-71 TOW; Rocket pods: 4 × 38 70mm Hydra rocket; Cannon: M197 - 3 × 20mm gatling-gun
	Boeing AH-64 Apache	AH-64DJP Apache Longbow	United States; Japan	Ground attack	12	13 built by Fuji under licence from Boeing, 1 crashed in 2018. Weapons: Air-to-air missiles: 4 × AIM-92 Stinger ATAS; ATGM: 4 × 4 AGM-114 Hellfire; Rocket pods: 4 × 38 70mm Hydra rocket; Cannon: M230A1 30mm
	–	Kawasaki OH-1	Japan	Scout	36	Successor of the OH-6D. Weapons: Air-to-air missiles: 4 × Type 91 AAM
Transport rotary-wing aircraft
	Bell Boeing V-22 Osprey	MV-22B	United States	V/STOL transport	17	
	CH-47 Chinook	Kawasaki CH-47J/JA	United States; Japan	Heavy transport helicopter	66	Built under licence by Kawasaki. J variant operational since 1984, JA since 1995.
	UH-60 Black Hawk	Mitsubishi UH-60JA	United States; Japan	Transport helicopter	39	Built under licence by Mitsubishi. A total of forty purchased, one lost on the 6 April 2023.
Utility rotary-wing aircraft
	Bell UH-1 Iroquois	Fuji UH-1J	United States; Japan	Utility helicopter	126	Built under licence by Fuji. Being replaced by the Subaru-Bell UH-2. Equipment: Type 87 mine dispersal device
	Bell CH-146 Griffon / Bell 412	Subaru-Bell UH-2	Canada; United States; Japan	Utility helicopter	10	150 planned to be ordered in the programme. Confirmed purchases: 6 (budget 2019); 7 (budget 2021); 13 (budget 2022); 12 (budget 2023); 16 (budget 2024); 16 (budget 2025)
Training rotary-wing aircraft
	Enstrom 480	TH-480B	United States	Trainer helicopter	30	In service since 2011.
VIP transport rotary-wing aircraft
	Eurocopter EC 225	EC 225LP	France	VIP Transport	3	Replacing the AS332L.

=== Unmanned aerial vehicles ===
Image	Model	Japan designation	Origin	Type	Role	Quantity	Notes
	–	JUXS-S1	Japan	Tiltrotor UAV	C-UAS	–	
	Boeing Insitu ScanEagle	–	United States	Fixed-wing UAV	ISR	1	Procured with the third supplementary budget for fiscal year 2011.
	Yamaha R-MAX Type IIG	–	Japan	Small helicopter UAV	ISR	6	Used during deployment to Iraq.
	–	Fuji FFOS	Japan	Small helicopter UAV	ISR	15	
	–	Fuji FFRS	Japan	Small helicopter UAV	ISR	15	
	Honeywell RQ-16 T-Hawk	–	United States	Ducted fan mini-UAV	Surveillance	20	
