= Type 24 Counter-Air Electronic Warfare System =

Military equipment of Japan

The Type 24 Electronic Warfare System is an electronic warfare system owned and operated by the Japan Ground Self-Defense Force. It is specifically designed to counter adverse airborne early warning and control capabilities through attacking their radars through non-kinetic means so as to enhance ground combatant survivability and lethality.

== Operators ==
Japan
deployed by the JGSDF

== Production ==
| Fiscal year | Cost (¥ billion) | Quantity | Notes |
| Target total | – | | |
| 2027 | – | – | |
| 2026 | ¥ 52 | 2 | |
| 2025 | ¥ 64 | 2 | |
| 2024 | ¥ 90 | 1 | |
| Total | ¥ 206 (+ ¥ 0) | 5 (+ 0) | – |

Targeted number of vehicles
Budget request

== Operational History ==
- 2020: procurement and initial field testings of the Type 24 Counter-Air Electronic Warfare System prototype
- January 25th, 2024: it's announced during the official new selected equipment result announcement that procurement will start in 2024 and the system will then begins mass production.
- September 3rd, 2024: the Minister of Defense announced the budgeted procurement of two systems during a news conference.

== See also ==
- List of equipment of the Japan Ground Self-Defense Forces
- Electronic countermeasure
