= Type 73 =

Type 73 may refer to:

- Hitachi Type 73, an artillery tractor
- Type 73 light machine gun, a North Korean light machine gun
- Mitsubishi Type 73 light truck, a series of mini SUVs used by the JSDF
- Type 73 armored personnel carrier, a Japanese armored personnel carrier
- Type 73 torpedo, a Japanese lightweight homing torpedo
