= Type 10 =

Japanese main battle tank

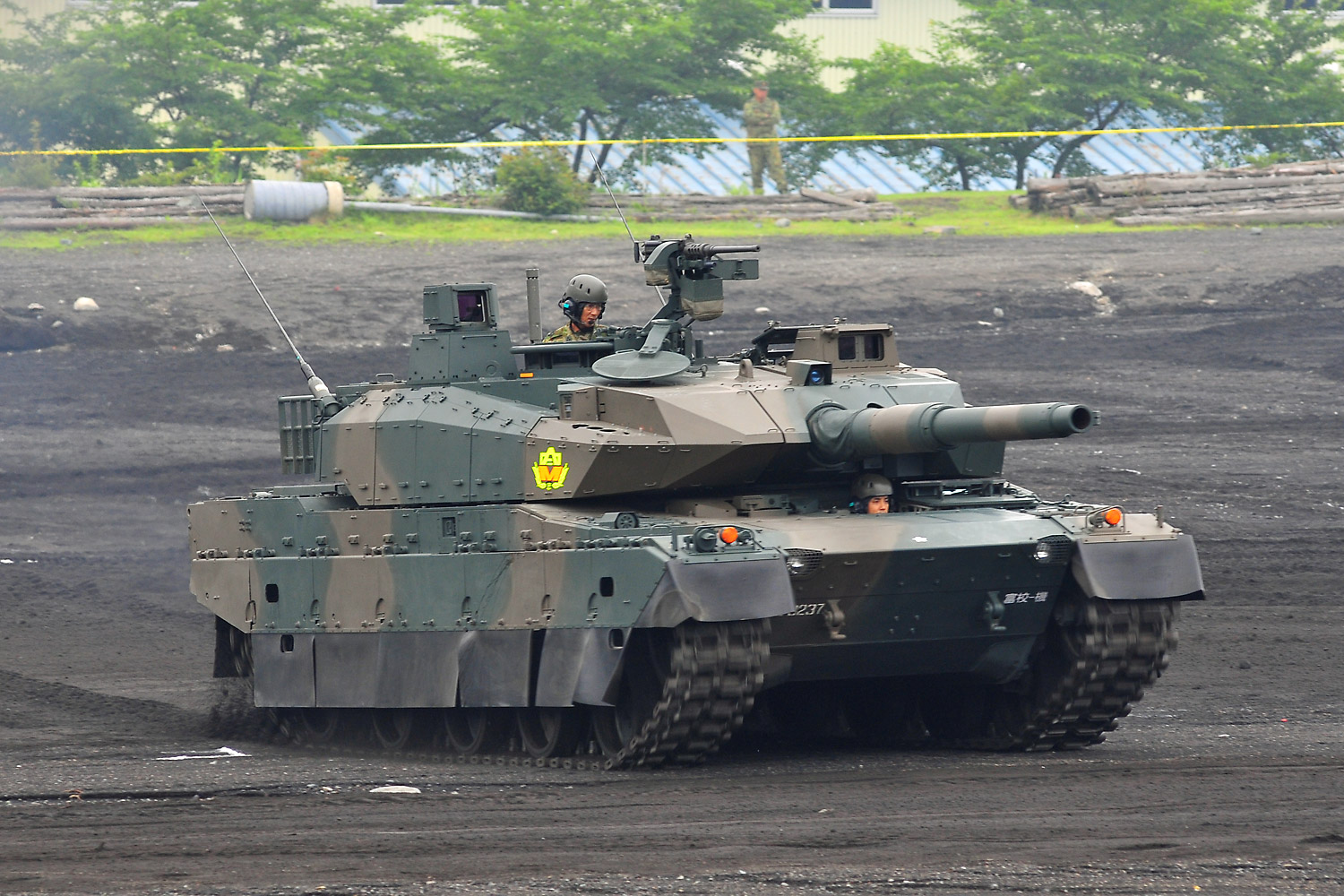
- A JGSDF Type 10 Tank in 2010
- Type: Main battle tank
- Place of origin: Japan

Service history
- In service: 2012 – present

Production history
- Manufacturer: Mitsubishi Heavy Industries
- Unit cost: $11.3 million (2022)
- Produced: 2010 (in production)
- No. built: 117 (FY 2010–2022)

Specifications
- Mass: 48 tonnes (full loadout), 44 tonnes (standard loadout), 40 tonnes (basic loadout)
- Length: 9.485 m
- Width: 3.24 m
- Height: 2.30 m
- Crew: 3 (commander, gunner and driver)
- Armor: modular ceramic composite armor, steel, light-weight upper armor.
- Main armament: Japan Steel Works 120 mm L/44 calibers-long smoothbore cannon with automatic loader (22 rounds)
- Secondary armament: Type 90 12.7 mm machine gun; Type 74 7.62 mm machine gun
- Engine: 4-stroke 22.6-litre diesel V8 MHI 8VA34WTK; 1,200 hp/2,300 rpm
- Power/weight: 27 hp/tonne
- Transmission: Continuously variable transmission (hydraulic-mechanical transmission)
- Suspension: Hydropneumatic suspension
- Operational range: 500 km
- Maximum speed: Forward: 70 km/h Backward: 70 km/h

The Type 10 (10式戦車, Hitomaru-shiki sensha) is a Japanese fourth generation main battle tank produced by Mitsubishi Heavy Industries for the Japanese Ground Self Defense Force. It entered service in 2012. Compared with other currently-serving main battle tanks in the JGSDF, the Type 10 is better equipped to deal with anti-tank weapons.

== History ==
The Type 10 started as the TK-X (MBT-X) project, intended to complement and eventually replace the Type 74 and Type 90 tanks in service with the JGSDF. Development began in the 1990s, and production started in 2010–2011. A prototype was revealed on February 13, 2008 at the Technology Research and Development Institute (TRDI) in Sagamihara, Japan. Emphasis was placed on the design's command and control capabilities.

On 4 January 2014, sources revealed that Turkey was interested in signing a joint development deal of tank engines based on the Type 10's engine. The Type 10 tank boasts high mobility, including a backward movement speed of 70 km/h (43 mph). The engine was to power the Turkish Altay tank. However, negotiations broke down, and the deal was "off the agenda" by March 2014. Provided reasons included Japan's stringent arms export ban laws, Turkey's intention to export the Altay themselves, and Japan's reluctance to license the engine.

In May 2026, the Philippines has reportedly looked into the Type 10 due to delays with delivering the Sabrah. Potentially, it can be used to either complement or replace the Sabrahs.

=== Accident ===
On April 21, 2026, a Type 10 shell exploded during a live-fire exercise at the Hijudai Training Area in Oita Prefecture, leaving three JGSDF tank crew members dead and another injured. Authorities have launched an investigation into the cause of the accident.

== Design ==
=== Development history ===
In the early 2000s, the JGSDF recognized a need to field a fourth generation tank in order to compete on a modern battlefield. C4I (Command, Control, Communication, Computing and Intelligence) capability was considered a high priority in designing the Type 10.

A Ministry of Defense assessment found that C4I upgrades to existing Type 74 and Type 90 tanks were not feasible, primarily due to a lack of internal space. Thus, development of a completely novel main battle tank was deemed necessary.

=== Armor ===
The use of modular components significantly improves the side armor compared to the Type 90. The commander's panoramic sight was moved to the right, and is mounted higher compared to the Type 90, giving the commander a wider field of view.

The vehicle's armor consists of removable sections, allowing operators to balance weight and protection depending on the mission profile. The Type 10 weighs 40 tonnes (44 short tons) in its base configuration, 44 tonnes (49 short tons) in standard configuration, and 48 tonnes (53 short tons) fully loaded. The prototype featured in 2008 at TRDI weighed 44 tonnes.

The Type 10 weighs less than its predecessor, the Type 90. The composite armor weight was increased, however, from 1,380 to 1,940 kg (3,040 to 4,280 lb) for the turret, and from 1,249 to 2,680 kg (2,754 to 5,908 lb) for the hull.

In a penetration resistance test, APFSDS rounds were fired at the hull from a distance of 250 m (270 yd). Each armor module and mantlet achieved the required performance specified in "Type 10 tank GV-Y120001E".

Protection against 120mm kinetic energy penetrators is limited to the front of the hull, turret, and gun mantlet, with the exception of the lower glacis.

The top armor can effectively counter explosively formed penetrators and related threats.

=== Electronics and mechanics ===
The Type 10 tank is equipped with a C4I system (command, control, communication, computer & intelligence) known as "10NW". This system integrates into the JGSDF network and enables real-time data sharing between tanks. It works alongside the Field Communication System (FiCS) and the Regiment Command Control System (ReCS).

According to design documentation, the C4I system enables the following capabilities:

- Platoon-level automatic target recognition and target synchronization
- Real-time commands from a platoon leader
- Real-time vehicle telemetry
- Fire control system integration
- Daytime and night vision cameras mounted around the turret, providing 360° coverage

The Type 10 also includes:

- A continuously variable transmission (CVT) allowing the tank to reach 70 km/h (43 mph) in both forward and reverse
- A faster autoloader allowing the main gun to fire every 3.5 seconds
- A hydropneumatic suspension system that provides improved recoil performance and chassis height adjustment

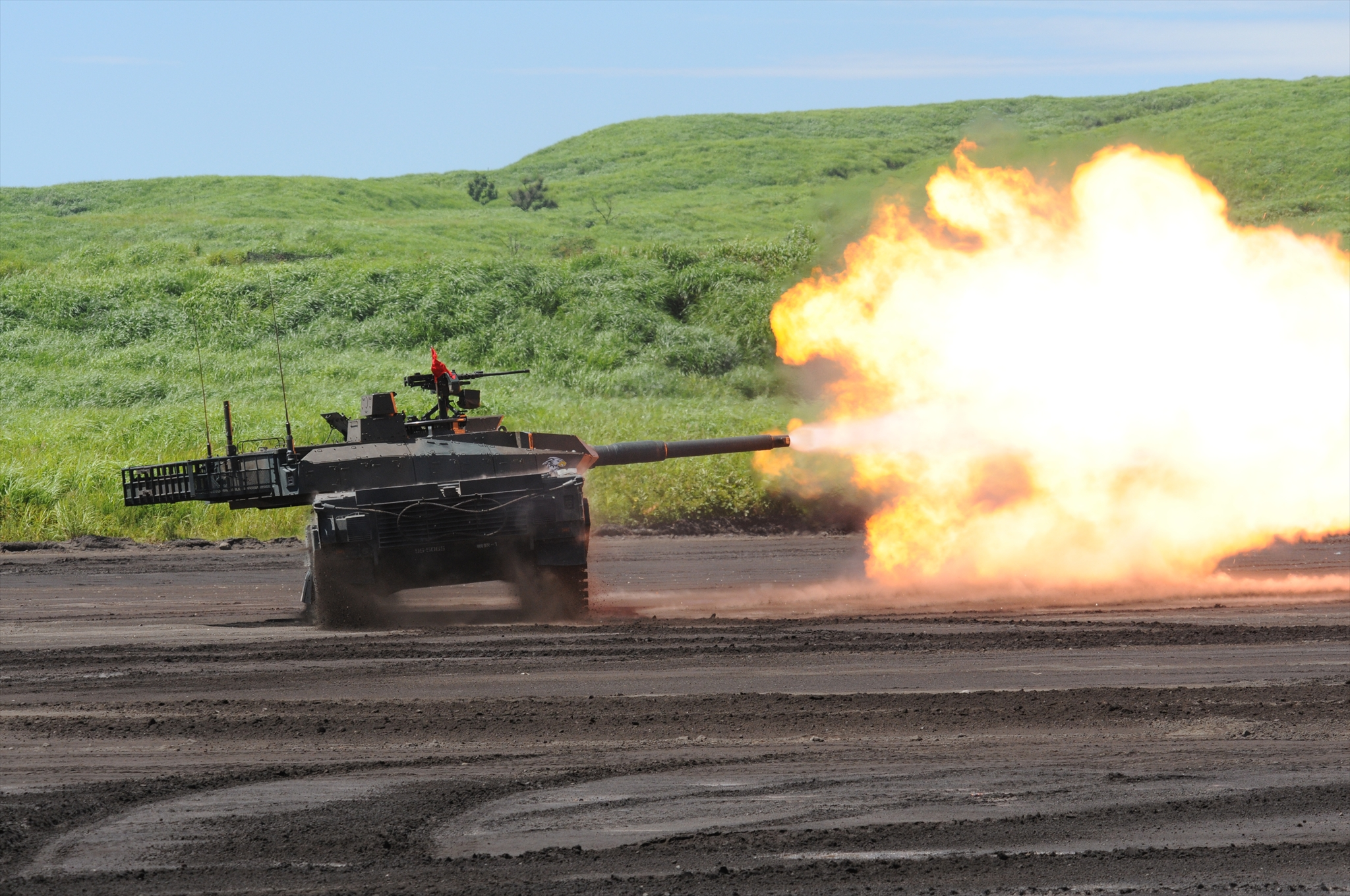
The Type 10 is equipped with a 120mm smoothbore gun

=== Armament ===
Whereas the Type 90 was equipped with the Rheinmetall Rh-120 smoothbore main gun (as on the German Leopard 2), the Type 10 uses a novel 120mm gun developed by Japan Steel Works. The gun can fire the newly developed Type 10 APFSDS round. It can also fire the JM33 APFSDS (a variant of the German DM33 shell, produced domestically under license) as well as 120mm NATO ammunition. The Type 10 holds 14 rounds in the autoloader, 2 behind the gunner, 6 rounds in the ready ammunition storage, and 14 in reserve, with a total of 36 rounds carried on board.

The gunner has access to a Type 74 coaxial machine gun chambered in 7.62×51mm NATO. The Type 74 is a heavier, vehicle-mounted variant of the Sumitomo Type 62 machine gun.

A M2 Browning .50 caliber machine gun chambered in 12.7x99mm NATO is affixed to a pintle-mount on the roof, and can be crewed by the commander.

=== Strategic transportation ===
The predecessor of the Type 10, the Type 90, was deployed only in Hokkaido due to road and bridge weight limitations in mainland Japan. For this reason, weight was a priority in design, as the Type 10 needed to be capable of deploying anywhere in Japan. Size and weight reductions made the Type 10 six tonnes lighter than the Type 90. Approximately 84% of bridges in Japan can accommodate the Type 10, compared to only 65% for the Type 90, and ~40% for other NATO tanks.

=== Development ===
The development costs as of 2008 are approximately ¥48.4 billion (equivalent to ¥54.2 billion or US$358.3 million in 2024). The projected cost per unit was approximately ¥700 million (equivalent to ¥784.3 million or US$5.2 million in 2024).

The Japanese Ministry of Defense formally acknowledged the Type 10 in December 2009.

In 2010, the Japanese Ministry of Defense placed a ¥12.4 billion (US$113 million) order for thirteen Type 10 tanks.

The Type 10 entered service in January 2012, with production continuing at a steady rate. As of 2020, there were 76 units in service, with plans to order 12 more that year.

== Operators ==
- Japan Japan Ground Self-Defense Force
  - Northern Army
    - 2nd Division
      - 2nd Tank Regiment
    - 7th Division
      - 71st Tank Regiment
  - Western Army
    - Western Army Tank Battalion

Fiscal year	Budget (¥ billion)	Type 10	Notes
2027	–	–	
2026	¥ 15.8	8	
2025	¥ 23.1	12	
2024	¥ 16.6	10	
2023	–	–	–
2022	¥ 8.3	6	
2021	–	–	–
2020	¥ 15.6	12	
2019	¥ 8.1	6	
2018	¥ 7.3	5	
2017	¥ 7.5	6	
2016	¥ 6.1	6	
2015	¥ 10.2	10	
2014	¥ 13.4	13	
2013	¥ 13.9	14	
2012	¥ 13.2	13	
2011	¥ 13.2	13	
2010	¥ 12.4	13	
Total	¥ 184.7 (+ ¥ 0.0)	147 (–)	–

Budget request

== Gallery ==
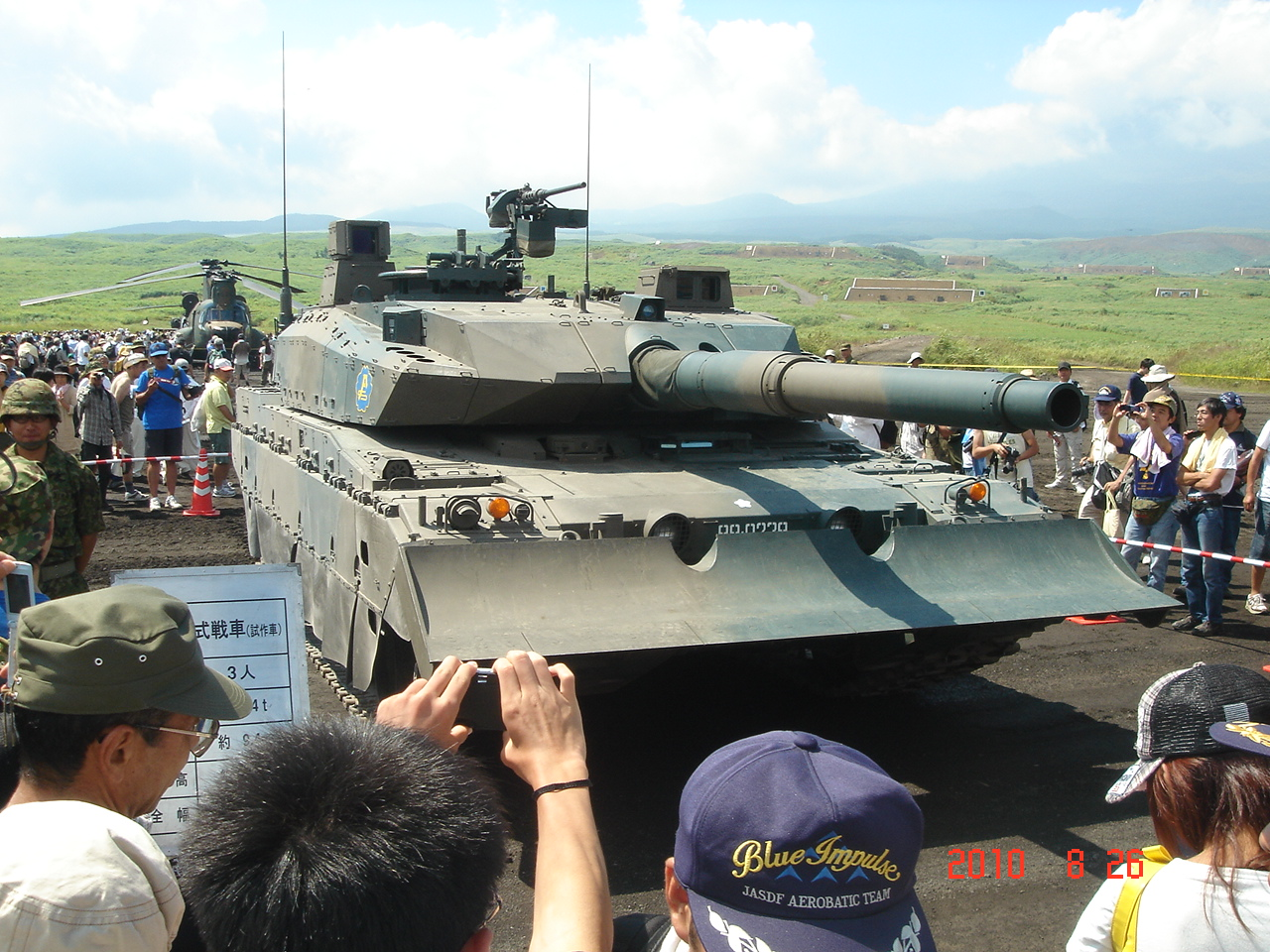
2010 prototype model

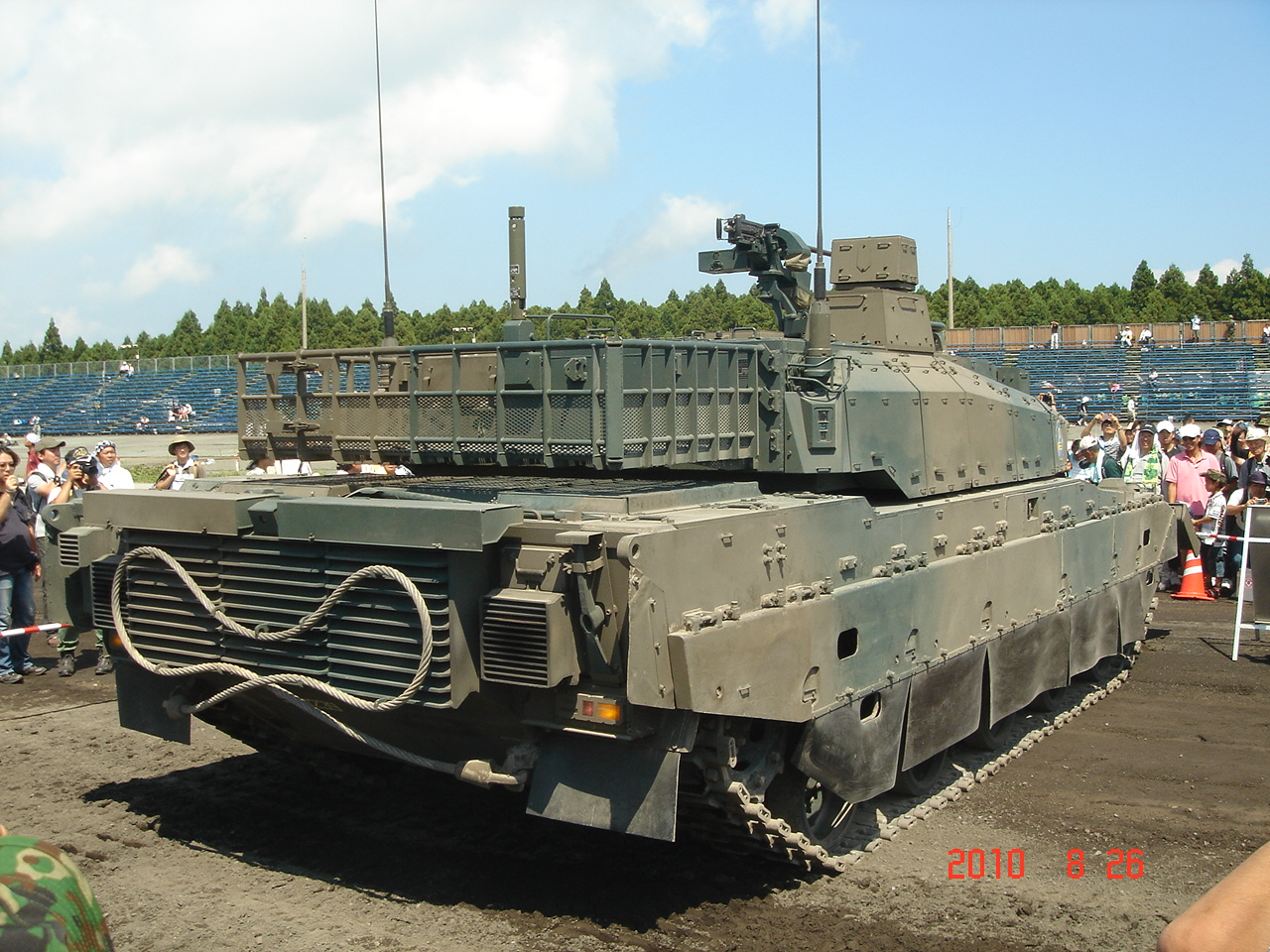
Rear view of the prototype

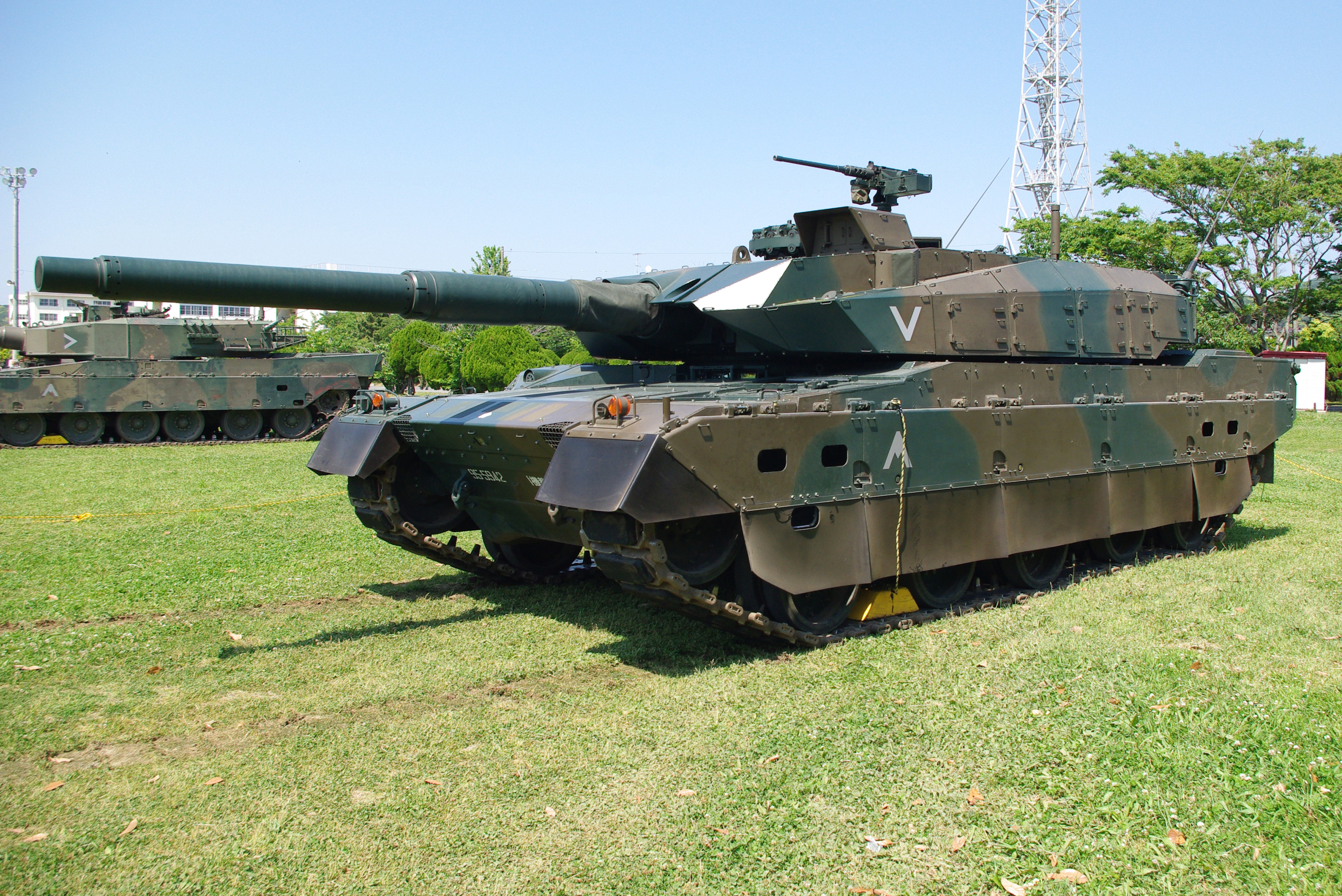
Production model

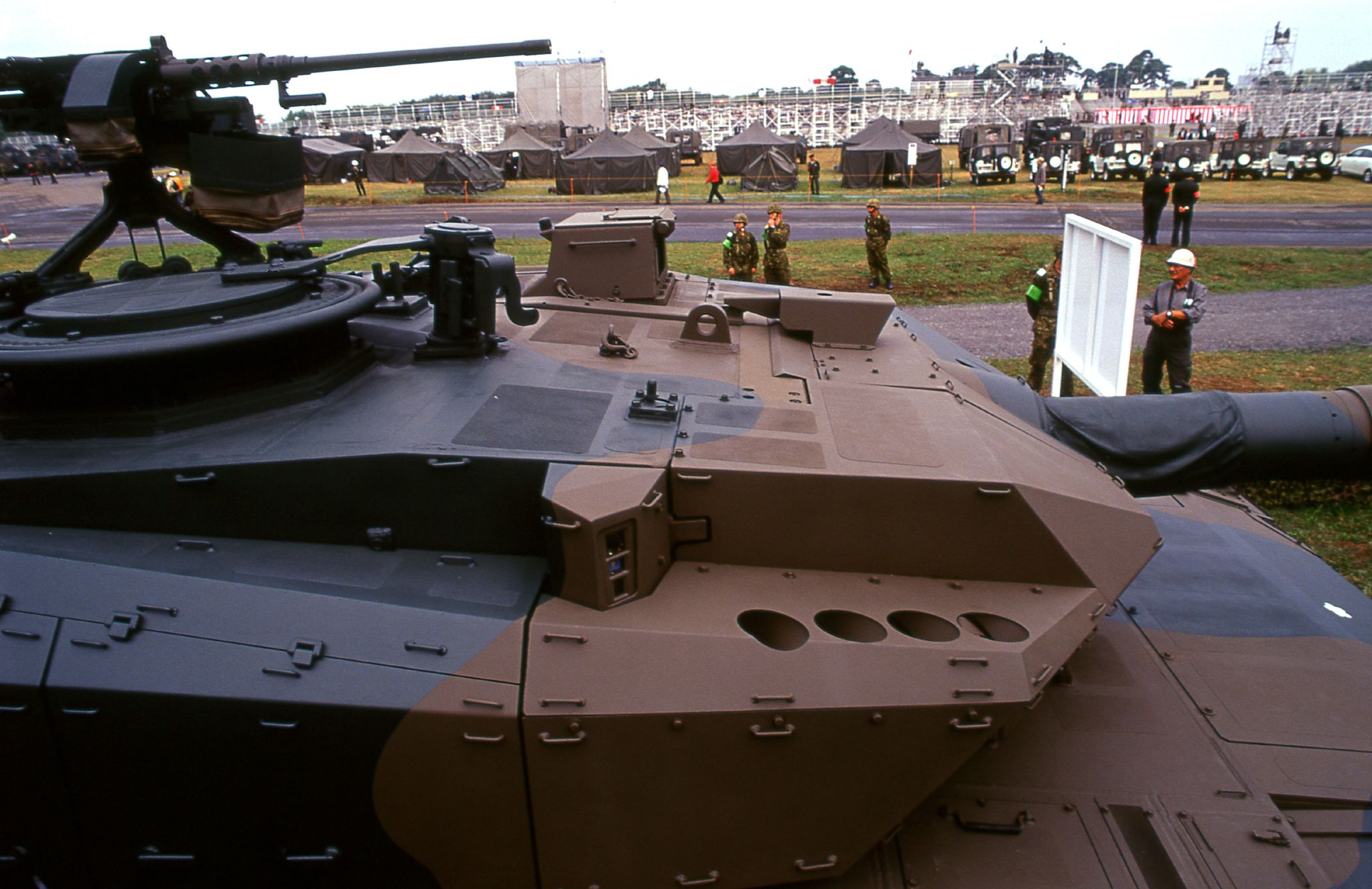
Side closeup of turret showing M2 Browning .50 caliber and smoke launchers

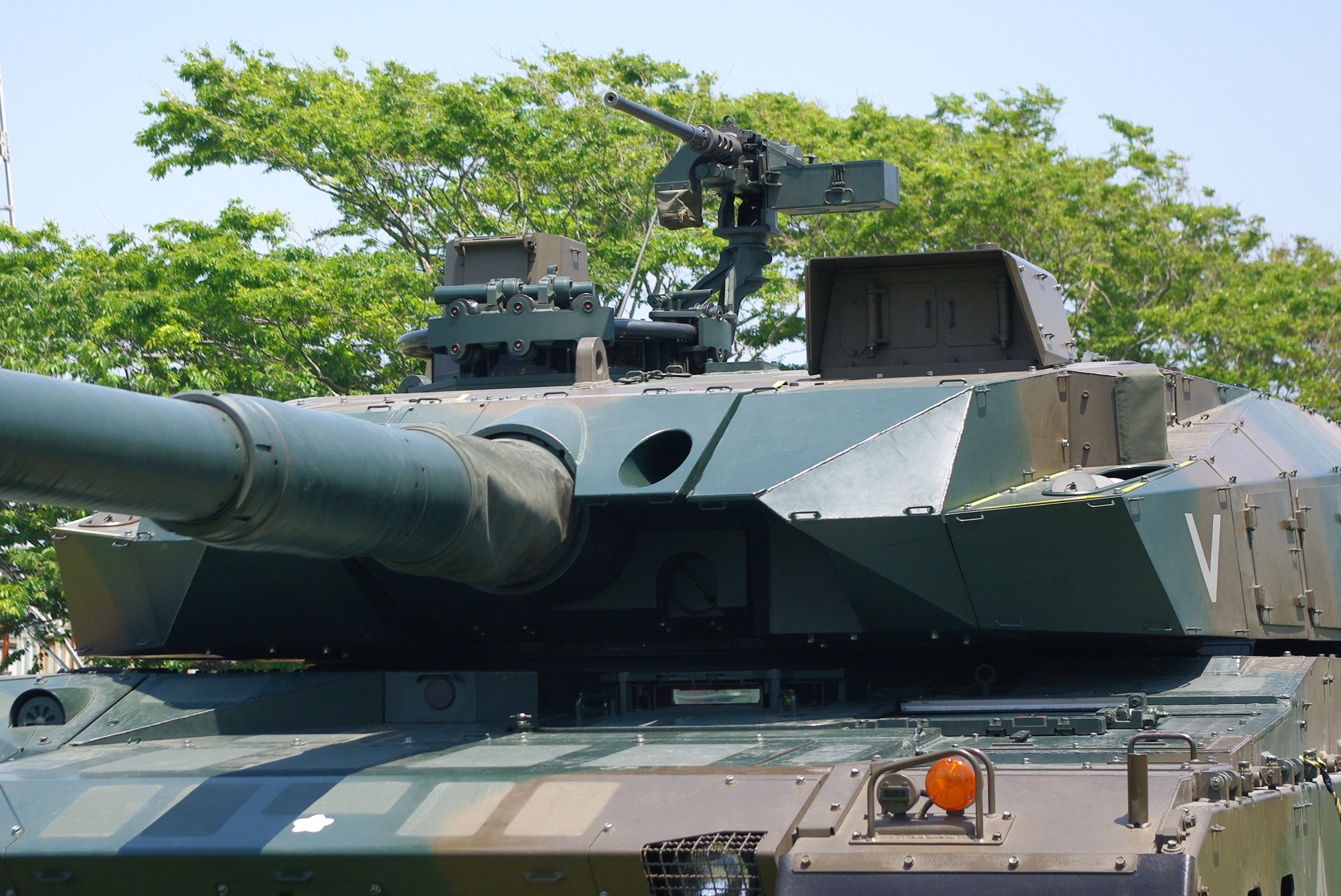
Front closeup of turret showing sensor package and M2 Browning .50 caliber

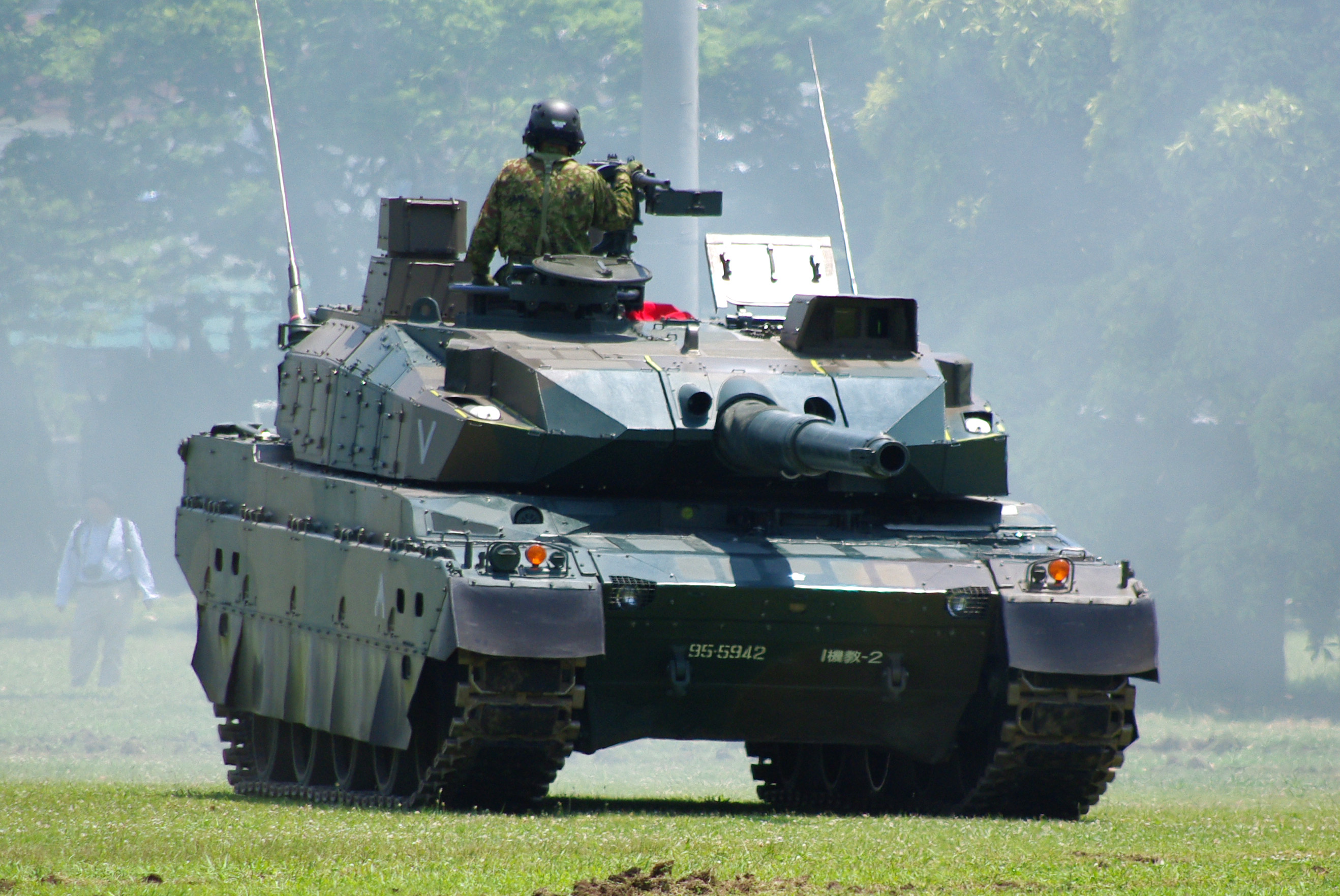
A tanker in the commander's hatch

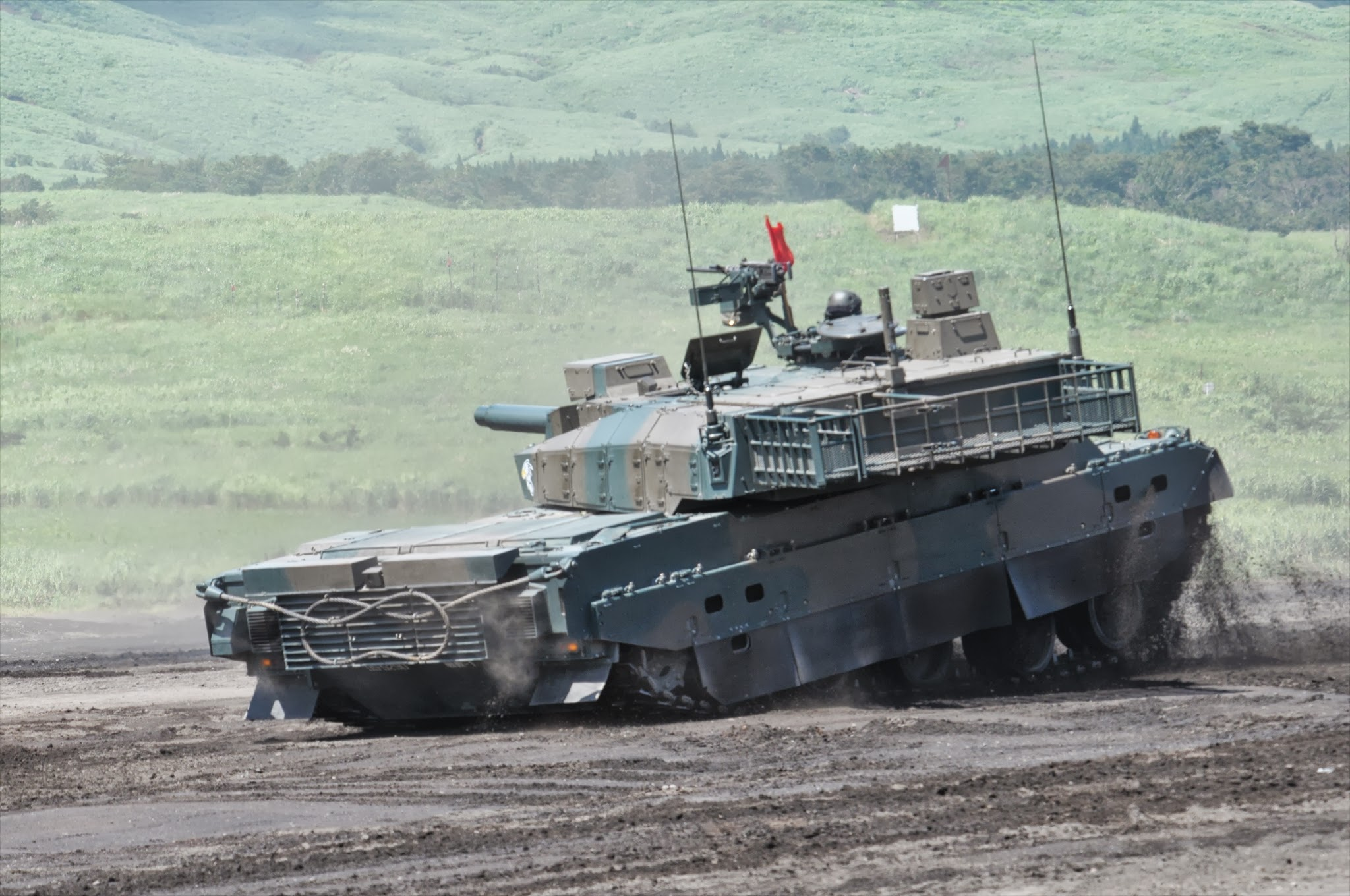
Braking demonstration

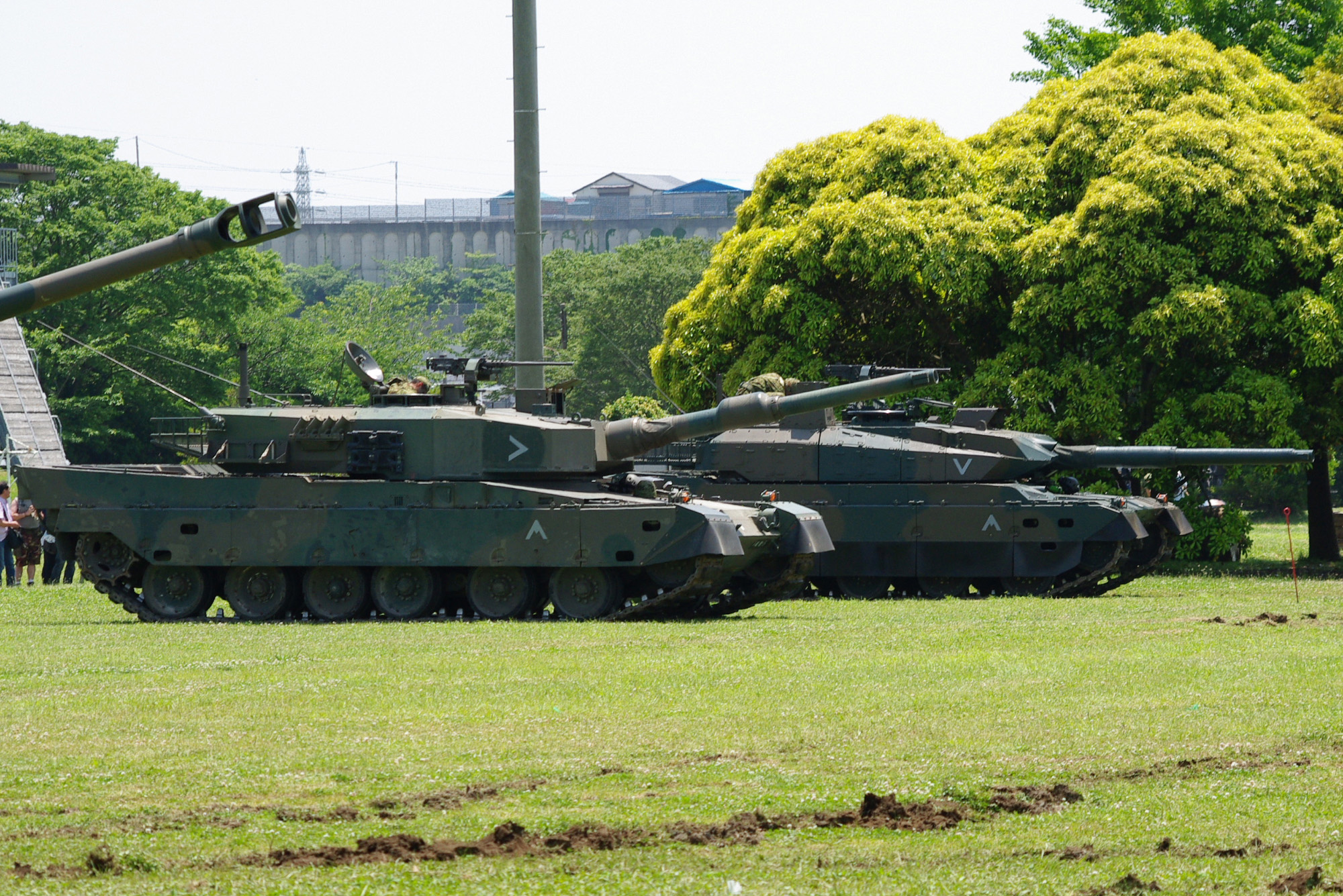
Type 90 (left) and Type 10 (right)

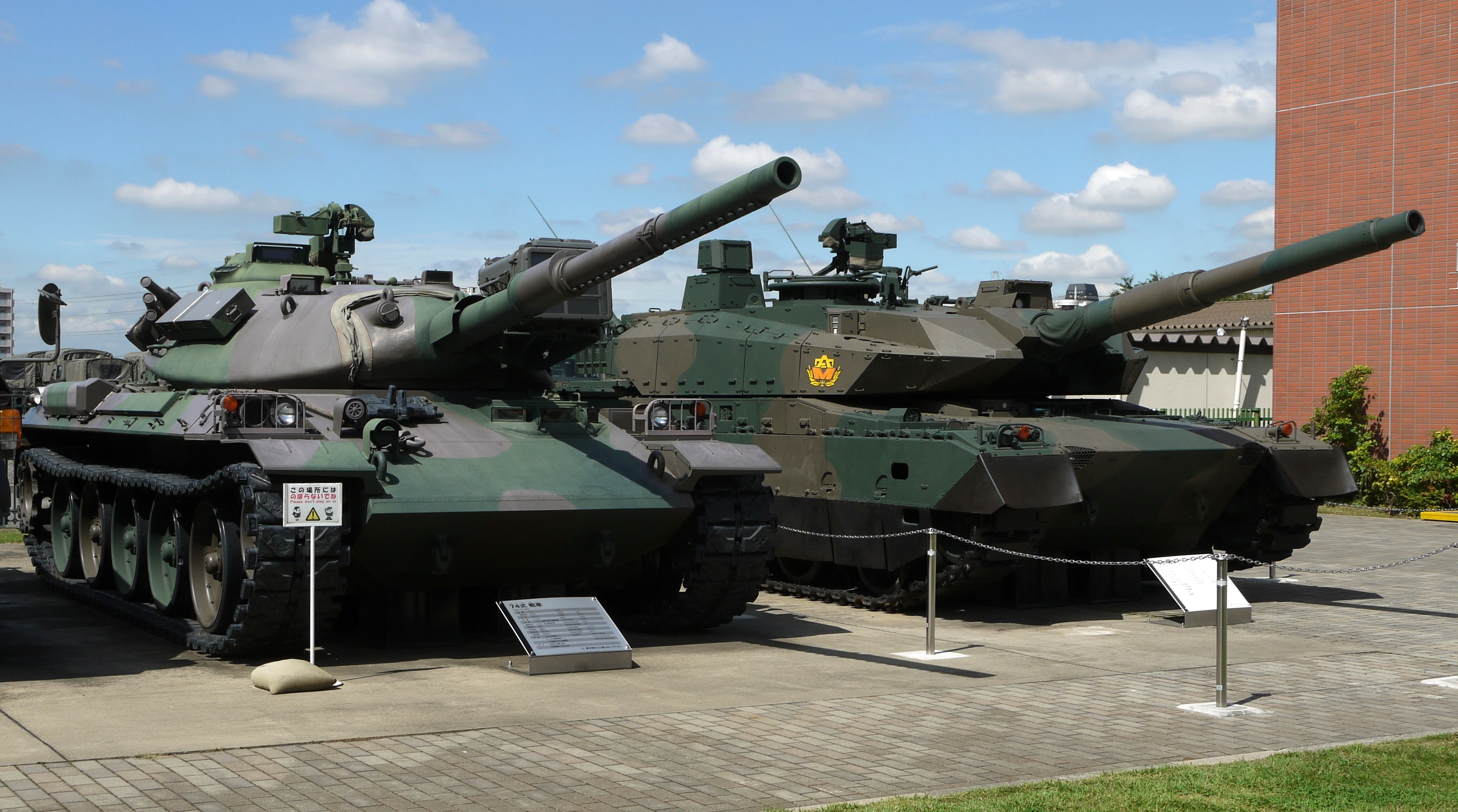
Type 74 (left) and Type 10 (right)

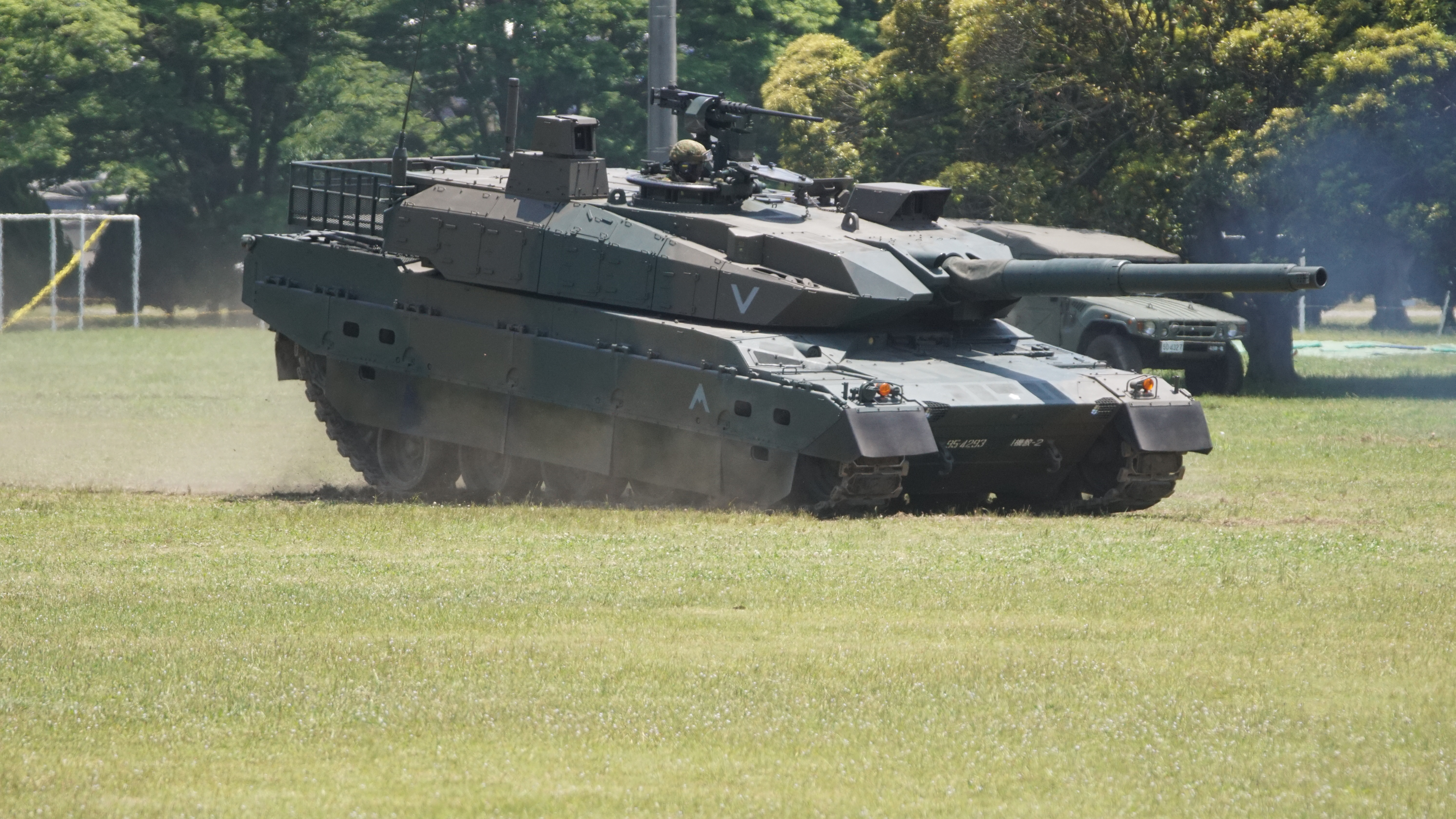
Braking demonstration during exercise

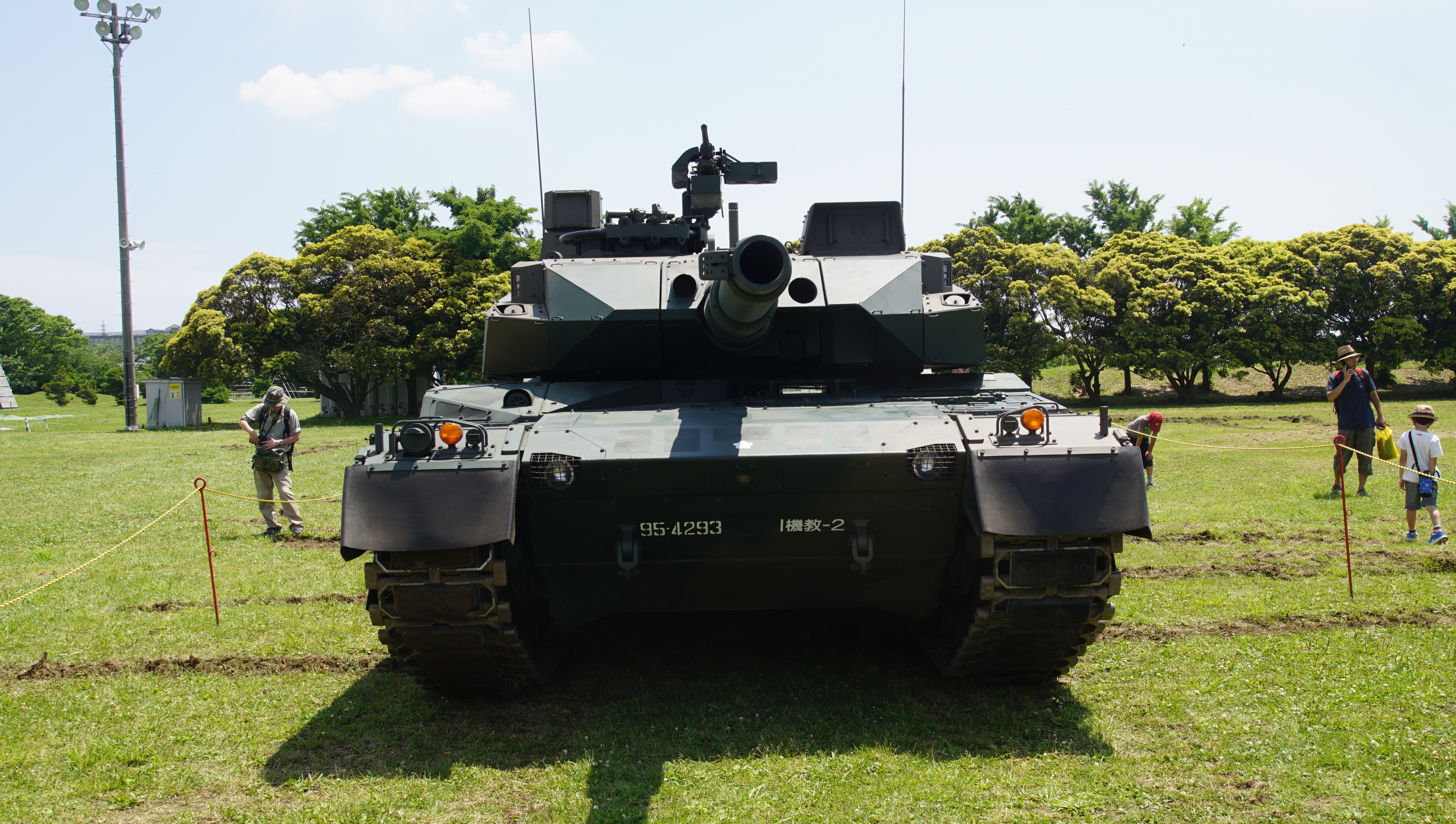
Front view

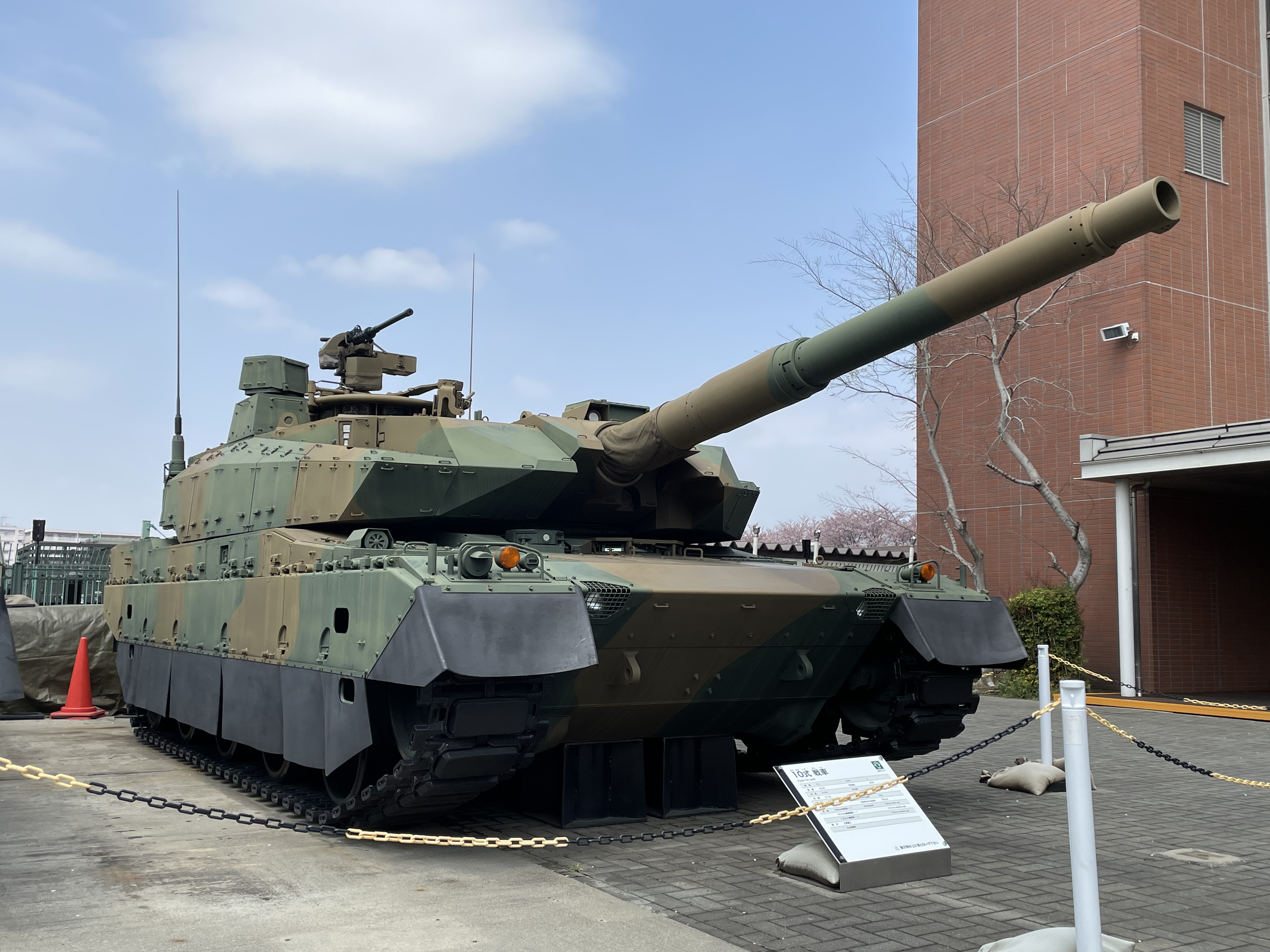
Prototype on display

== See also ==
- M10 Booker, US light tank/assault gun comparable in weight and price to Type 10
- Type 15 tank – (China)
- 2S25 Sprut-SD – (Russia)
