= Howa Type 89 =

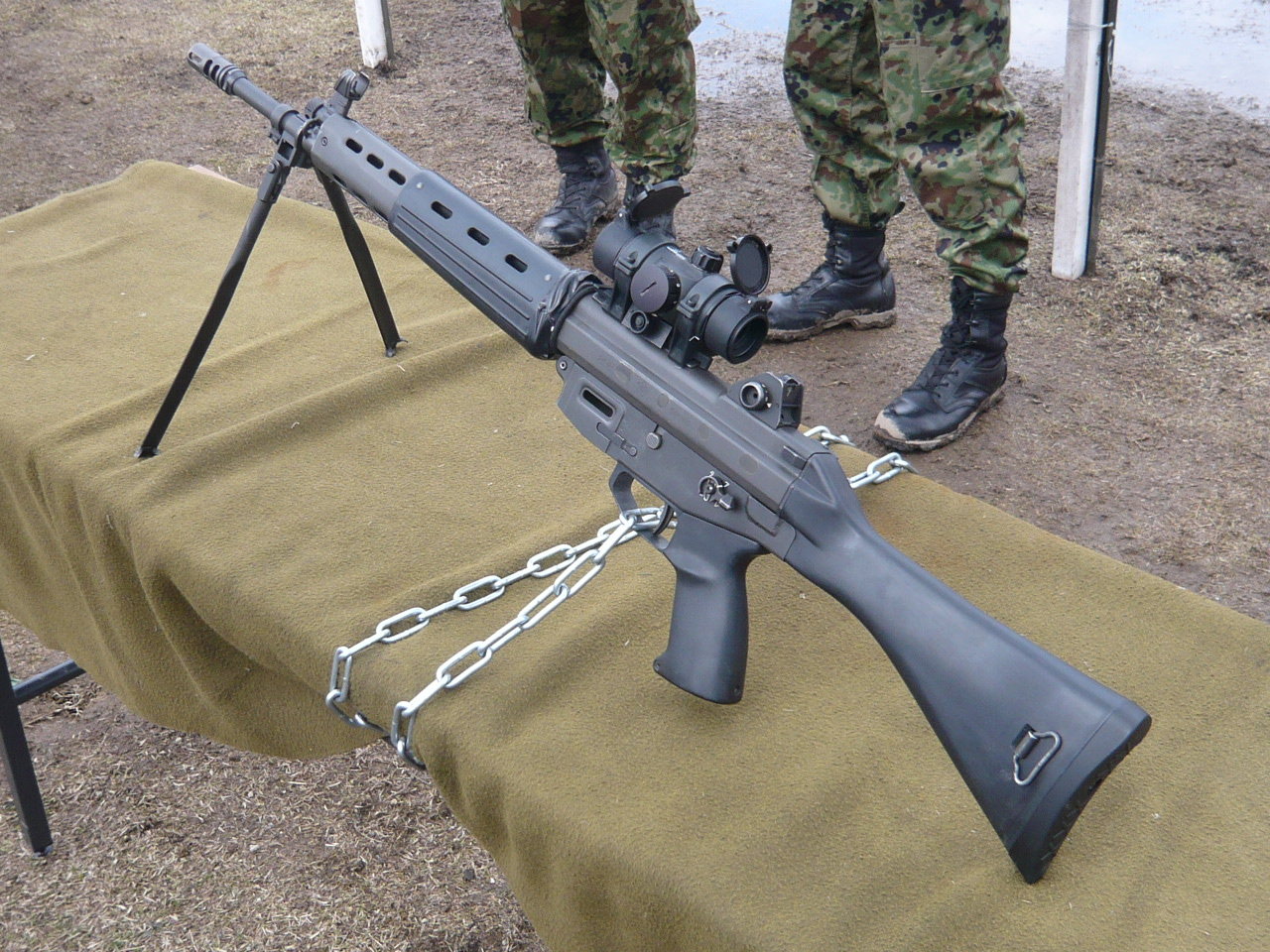
- The Type 89 assault rifle
- Type: Assault rifle
- Place of origin: Japan

Service history
- In service: 1989–present
- Used by: Japan Self-Defense Forces; Japan Coast Guard; Special Assault Team
- Wars: Iraq War

Production history
- Designer: Defense Agency Technical Research and Development Institute
- Manufacturer: Howa
- Unit cost: ¥347,000 (1998) ¥325,800 (2005)
- Produced: 1989–present
- Variants: See Variants

Specifications
- Mass: 3.5 kg (7.7 lb)
- Length: 916 mm (36.1 in), (670 mm (26.4 in) Howa Type 89-F)
- Barrel length: 420 mm (16.5 in)
- Cartridge: 5.56×45mm NATO
- Action: short stroke gas piston, rotating bolt.
- Rate of fire: 750 rounds/min
- Muzzle velocity: 920 m/s
- Effective firing range: 500 m
- Feed system: 20/30-round detachable STANAG magazines
- Sights: Iron sights; optical sights can be placed with Weaver or Picatinny railing mount

The Howa Type 89 assault rifle (89式小銃, hachi-kyū-shiki-shōjū), referred to as the Type 89 5.56 mm rifle (89式5.56mm小銃, hachi-kyū-shiki-go-ten-go-roku-miri-shōjū), is a Japanese assault rifle used by the Japan Self-Defense Forces, the Japan Coast Guard's Special Security Team units, and the Special Assault Team. It has never been exported outside Japan due to its strict Japanese arms-export ban. It is known in JGSDF service as the Hachikyū (a Japanese reading of the number 89) or by its nickname Buddy.

The Type 89 was introduced to replace the Howa Type 64 battle rifle in frontline units, entering service in 1989. It has remained Japan's principal service rifle since then. Small numbers of the Type 89's successor, the Howa Type 20, were purchased in 2020. The Type 20 is intended to supplement and eventually replace the Type 89.

== History ==
Like most other nations, Japan began the Cold War with a battle rifle – the 7.62×51mm NATO Howa Type 64. However, over time, especially during the Vietnam War, the battle rifle's shortcomings became apparent, and ultimately, battle rifles began to be replaced with assault rifles, which fired intermediate cartridges, though they had a weaker effective range compared to battle rifles. The 5.56×45mm round (SS109), first used in the M16 rifle, eventually became the standard of ammunition type for all NATO member assault rifles. In accordance with this, the Defense Agency began development on their next generation assault rifle to replace the Type 64 battle rifle after its 25-year span of service.

Development was handled primarily by Howa since it was already licensed to produce the AR-180 version of the Armalite AR-18 rifle for commercial purposes, and some of the Type 89's internal workings are the same as those of the AR-18 - the Type 89 uses the same short-stroke gas piston system with a rotating bolt as the AR-18, but not its dual recoil springs. In order to determine the suitability of the rifle, it was issued in limited numbers to the Japan Self-Defense Forces for field testing purposes. After the data collected from the field testing stage of the AR-18 was examined, formal development of the next-generation assault rifle began with its designation as the HR-16 (HR1604). The HR-15 was the first version of the experimental rifle that would eventually become the Type 89, but was developed concurrently with the HR-10, HR-11 and HR-13 by 1989.

On December 6, 2019, the Japanese Ministry of Defense announced that plans have started to eventually change the Type 89 to a new 5.56-based assault rifle. In 2020, the Howa Type 20 was developed, and is planned to replace the Type 89 as Japan's service rifle.

== Design ==
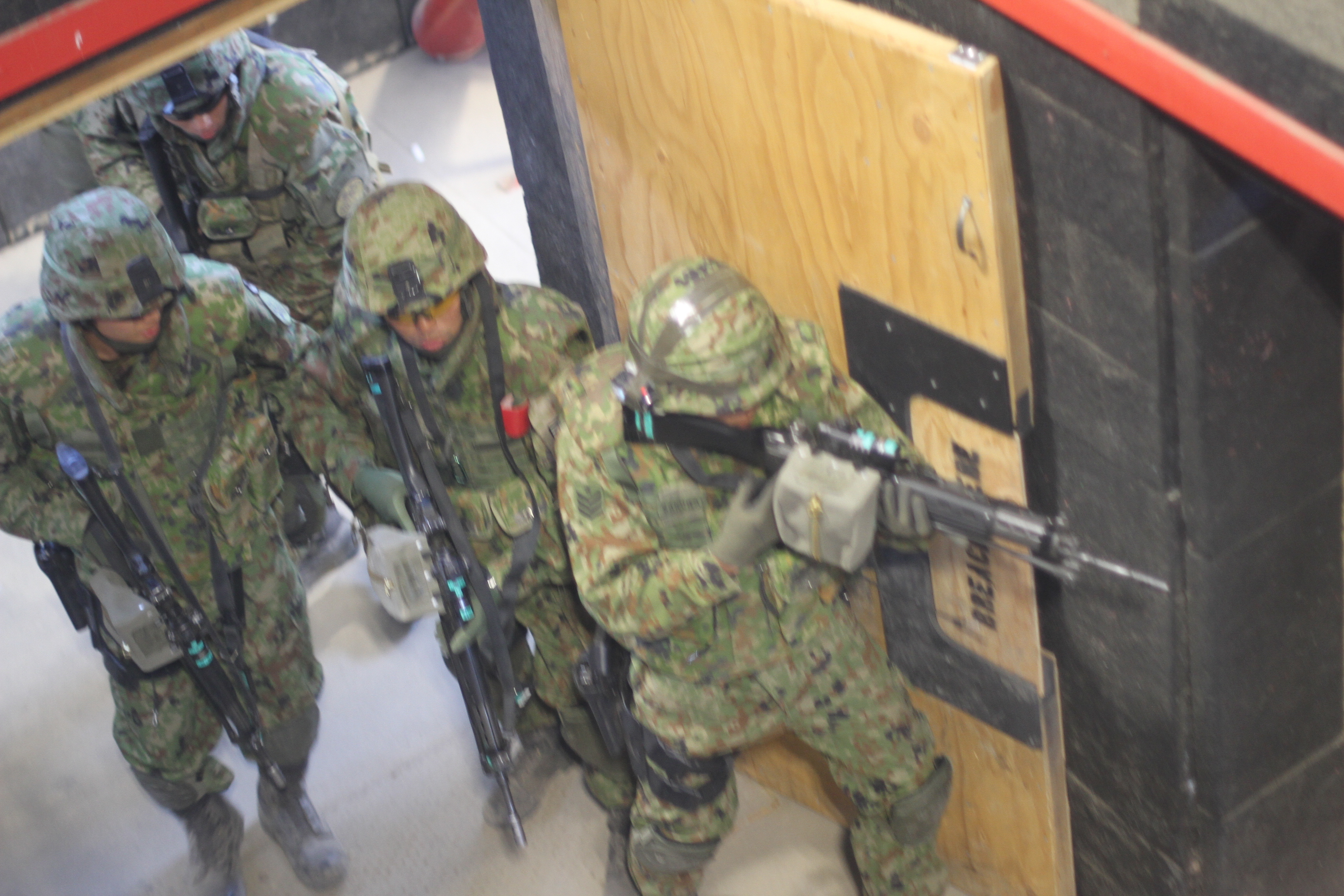
JGSDF soldiers practice CQB tactics at the Yakima Training Center's combat training building, armed with Type 89s.

One of the most advantageous features of the Type 89 rifle over the Type 64 was the ability to ease the load on the individual soldier in relation to the amount of ammunition that he could carry. Also, due to the use of aluminum and thermoset plastic as opposed to the steel and wood construction of the Type 64 rifle, the speed with which a soldier could react to a threat was increased. The fixed-stock version of the rifle contains a storage space covered by a rubberized cap, which may be accessed by pulling the cap away from the body for the rifle and rotating it in either direction. Although the typical issue model is equipped with a fixed stock, a small number were manufactured with a folding stock made from steel tubing, and were intended for issue to AFV crews and paratroopers.

Fit and finish of the Type 89 was improved greatly over the Type 64 due to the use of forged aluminum, molded thermoset plastics and stamped steel manufacturing methods pioneered by the processes used to produce the AR-18 and Heckler & Koch G3 series rifle.

=== Cost ===
The Type 89 was designed with simplified operation and minimal number of parts due to the understanding that the complex structure and large number of parts were responsible for the often defective operation of the Type 64 rifle. Because of this, the cost of the Type 89 rifle was roughly half that of the 870,000 yen Type 64 rifle in 1989. According to the Defense Agency, the unit cost of the Type 89 rifle was reduced to about 340,000 yen by fiscal year 2005,and by 280,000 yen by fiscal year 2008. However, this slightly increased to approximately 320,000 yen in 2018 due to a decrease in procurement.

Despite this, it is still considered too expensive for general issue as the ideal price required by the Japanese Government for general production is between 10,000 and 100,000 yen per unit. This is further complicated because the procurement method for the weapon is limited to single fiscal year accounting and further reductions in manufacturing process costs are currently non-existent.

=== Magazine ===
The Type 89 can accept magazines designed for the M16 series of rifles. However, the magazine produced specifically for the Type-89 uses a follower that has a special shape to hold the bolt open after the final round is spent. If an M16 magazine is used, the bolt will not lock back after the final round is expended. The magazine designed for the Type 89 also differs from ones produced for the M16 because it has holes in the sides of the body to indicate if it has been loaded with 30 or 20 rounds of ammunition. However, this comes with the hidden cost of allowing sand and other foreign bodies to enter the magazine easily and cause malfunctions in the operation of the weapon.

Unlike the M16, the magazine well of the Type 89 is not beveled or tapered because the lower receiver is only slightly wider than that of the magazine body, which makes reloading the rifle more difficult.

=== Ammunition ===
Type 89 rifle ammunition is interchangeable with the 5.56×45mm SS109/M855 round used by the U.S. military and NATO. Along with the 7.62×51mm round used in the Type 64 rifle, this allows for interchangeability with ammunition stockpiles of U.S. forces stationed in Japan. Since the ammunition developed for the Type 89 rifle is produced in Japan, it is head stamped with the sakura mark of the Self Defense Forces instead of the typical NATO circle-cross used on the SS109/M855 round.

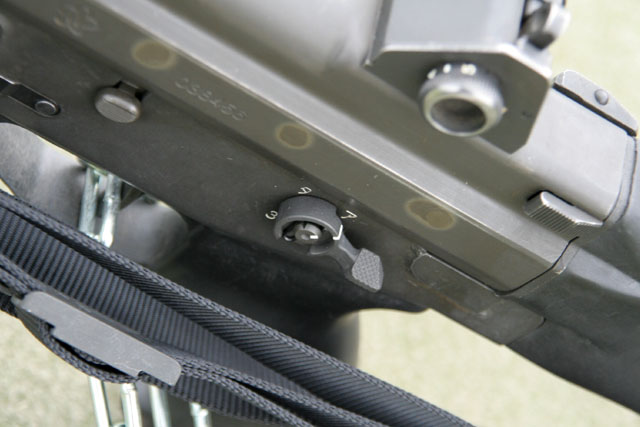
Type 89 trigger group

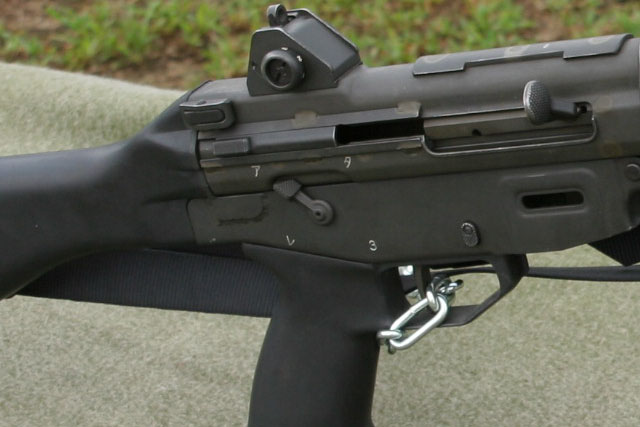
Type 89 fire selection

The selector switch is located on the right side of the lower receiver and is often referred to as the "Atare 3", (アタレサン, Ataresan, from アタレ (Atare) meaning "hit it") referencing the different selection positions. The markings and associated feature are as follows in functional order:

ア (アンゼン=safe) → レ (レンシャ=auto) → 3 (3-round burst) → タ (タンパツ=semi)

The 3-round burst feature is built separately from the rest to prevent the selector switch from being totally useless in case it can't be used due to accident or a malfunction. It can also be taken out of the receiver when needed.

=== Accessories ===
The bayonet manufactured specifically for the Type 89 rifle can be used as a wire cutter by connecting it to a lug on the scabbard. Furthermore, the end of the bayonet scabbard can be used as a bottle opener. The U.S. military-issued M9 bayonet may also be affixed to the rifle.

The Type 89 rifle is equipped with an integrated bipod to facilitate accuracy, which was also on the Type 64. However, unlike the bipod on the Type 64, the version on the Type 89 is easily removed as it is clamped onto the barrel behind the bayonet lug with a clothes-pin style spring mechanism and retained with a lever-like lock. Also, the Type 89's handguard is molded with inlets along its lower edges in order to accommodate the legs of the bipod if they are folded inwards for storage.

The Type 06 rifle grenade is designed for the Type 89. The attachment of the M203 grenade launcher is possible with the proper adapter.

Special forces units of the Japan Ground Self-Defense Force are additionally issued a pressure switch-activated targeting laser and flashlight which are mounted on the barrel end of the weapon ahead of the front sight assembly. Regular members of the Self-Defense Forces may also obtain these, but must pay for them out of their own funds.

=== Later improvements ===
Around 2003, several modifications were made to the Type 89 due to the armed deployment to Iraq of JSDF members as well as an overall concern over counter-terrorist and possible future combat deployments. In accordance with the "Iraq Revival Support Law on Special Measures on Land for the U.S. Military" (イラク復興支援特措法) or the "Self-Defense Forces Iraq Dispatch Law", a selector switch has been manufactured and installed on the left hand side of the lower receiver for ambidextrous use for rifles issued to JSDF members in Iraq. However, this is only a temporary modification and the rifle must be returned to its original state (with the selector switch on the right side only) when it is returned to Japan.

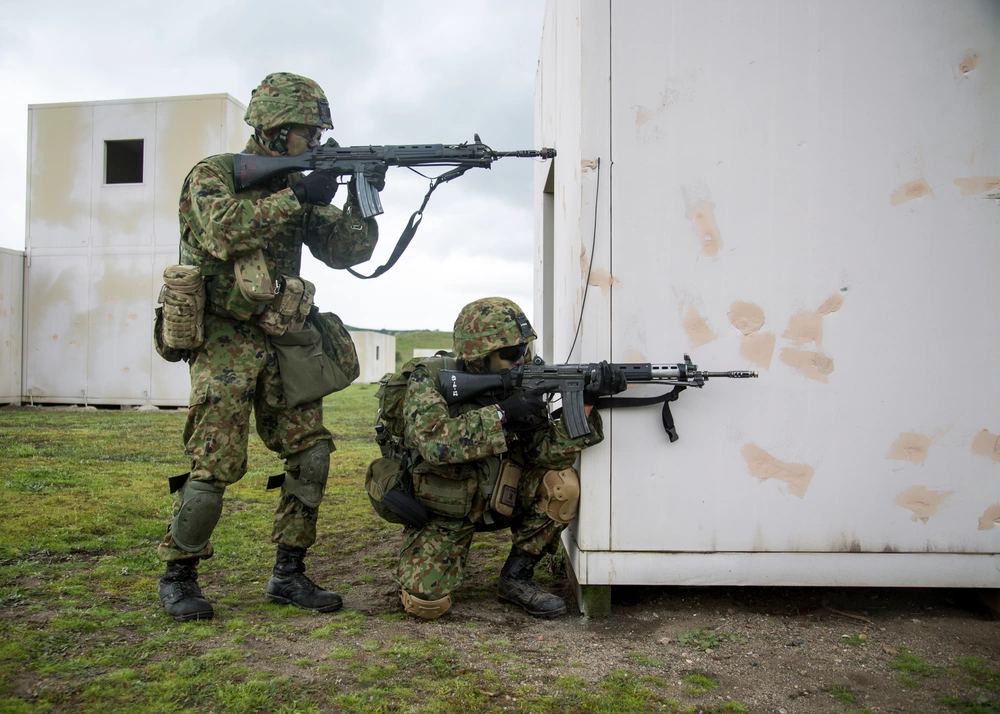
JGSDF soldiers with the Type 89 during a training exercise in 2017

In 2004, JSDF elements that had the possibility of seeing combat were issued an optic (an unmagnified red dot sight) with their Type 89 along with a mounting bracket in order to decrease target acquisition time. However, since the use of the sight is still in its provisional stage, individual JSDF members are expected to purchase their own commercially available model for use in a possible combat theater.

Commonly used optics, which are most observed in use by JSDF personnel during training exercises, are the MD-33, manufactured by Sightron Japan (formerly Tasco Optics Japan), the EOTech 551, and the Aimpoint CompM2/ML2 (which are both privately purchased by individual troops).

During the initial deployment in Iraq, JSDF elements that had the possibility of seeing combat (for example the Western Army Infantry Regiment) were issued a removable foregrip and a 25mm Weaver rail was installed under the front handguards of their Type 89s to accommodate it. Shortly afterwards, the restriction was lifted and all units began to receive foregrips despite common complaints about damage to the handguards that were caused by the mount. However, the JGSDF prohibited the attachment of foregrips due to concerns of damage.

A three-point sling was issued to JSDF elements that had the possibility of seeing combat due to the positive testimonials of various international military and police forces. The issued three-point sling is in black color (unlike the olive-drab for standard sling), with a buckle similar to the one for the ALICE LC-2 belt. Individual JSDF members were also allowed to purchase their own commercially available models for their own use if they wished.

== Variants ==
=== Type 89-F ===
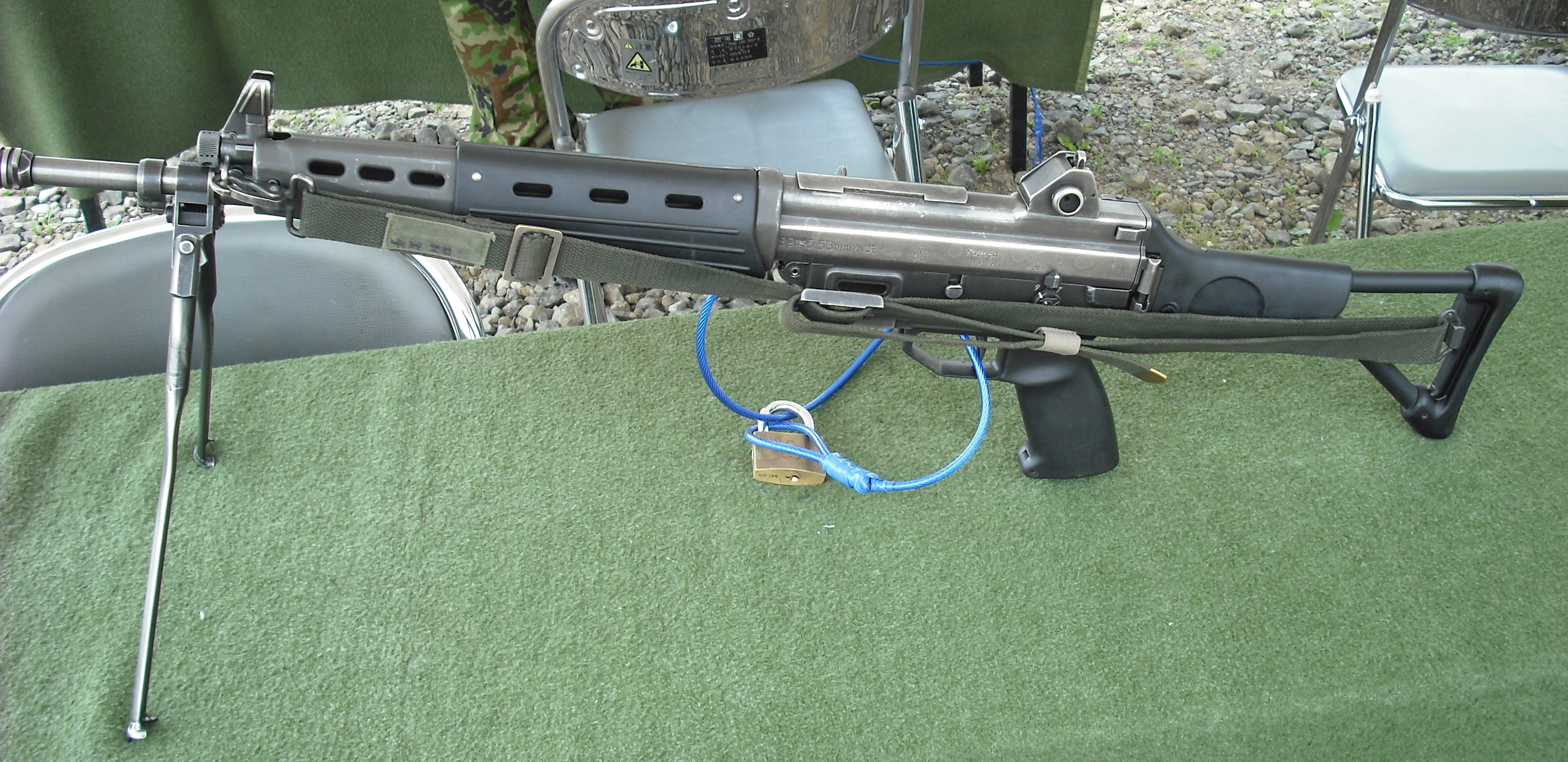
An early production Type 89F, with bipod deployed

The Type 89-F rifle, also known as the Type 89 Para, has a folding stock instead of the fixed stock of the standard Type 89.

The Type 89-F is issued to paratroopers of the 1st Airborne Brigade, armored vehicle crews, and the Special Forces Group, as well as the Special Assault Team. In addition, the Type 89-F was also issued as a replacement for the M3A1 submachine gun, which was used by JGSDF tank crews as a personal defense weapon. The stock folds to the left side to avoid interfering with the fire selector on the right side. The folding stock itself is made of plastic and an aluminum alloy. The base of the stock has a plastic cover that serves as a cheek rest for use in colder conditions.

With the stock folded, the Type 89-F has a length of 670 mm (26 in).

=== ACIES carbine ===
As part of the development of the JSDF's Advanced Combat Infantry Equipment System (先進個人装備)—which is the approximate equivalent of the American Future Soldier program—some Type 89 Rifles have been modified to a carbine format with an overall length of about 800 mm (31 in), a four-sided rail system, a polymer retractable stock, and a shorter barrel.

Publicity photographs taken at exhibitions hosted by the Technical Research and Development Institute of the Japanese Ministry of Defense (TRDI) also show that the third generation of the prototyping process for ACIES has now produced a full-size version of this modified Type 89 with a retractable stock and rail system. This variant has a full-length barrel and an overall length of about 940 mm (37 in). An underbarrel digital interface switch connected to a foregrip has also been developed, along with an unusually large top-mounted sighting system. The sighting system incorporates a ranging device and a video camera so that, at least under shooting range conditions, it is possible to hold the rifle at a distance from the body to train and fire it around corners—much like analogous foreign systems. There was also some evidence of evaluation of other assault rifles as possible replacements for the Type 89, but this may no longer be the case, until the Type 20 was selected as the winner of a competition held by the JSDF to replace the Type 89 in frontline service.

== Bibliography ==
- Hogg, Ian (2000). Jane's Guns Recognition Guide Second Edition. Glasgow: Janes. ISBN 0-00-472453-4.
- Jones, Richard D.; Ness, Leland S., eds. (2010). Jane's Infantry Weapons 2010-2011. Jane's Publishing. ISBN 978-0710629081.
