= Type 06 rifle grenade =

Type 06 Rifle Grenade
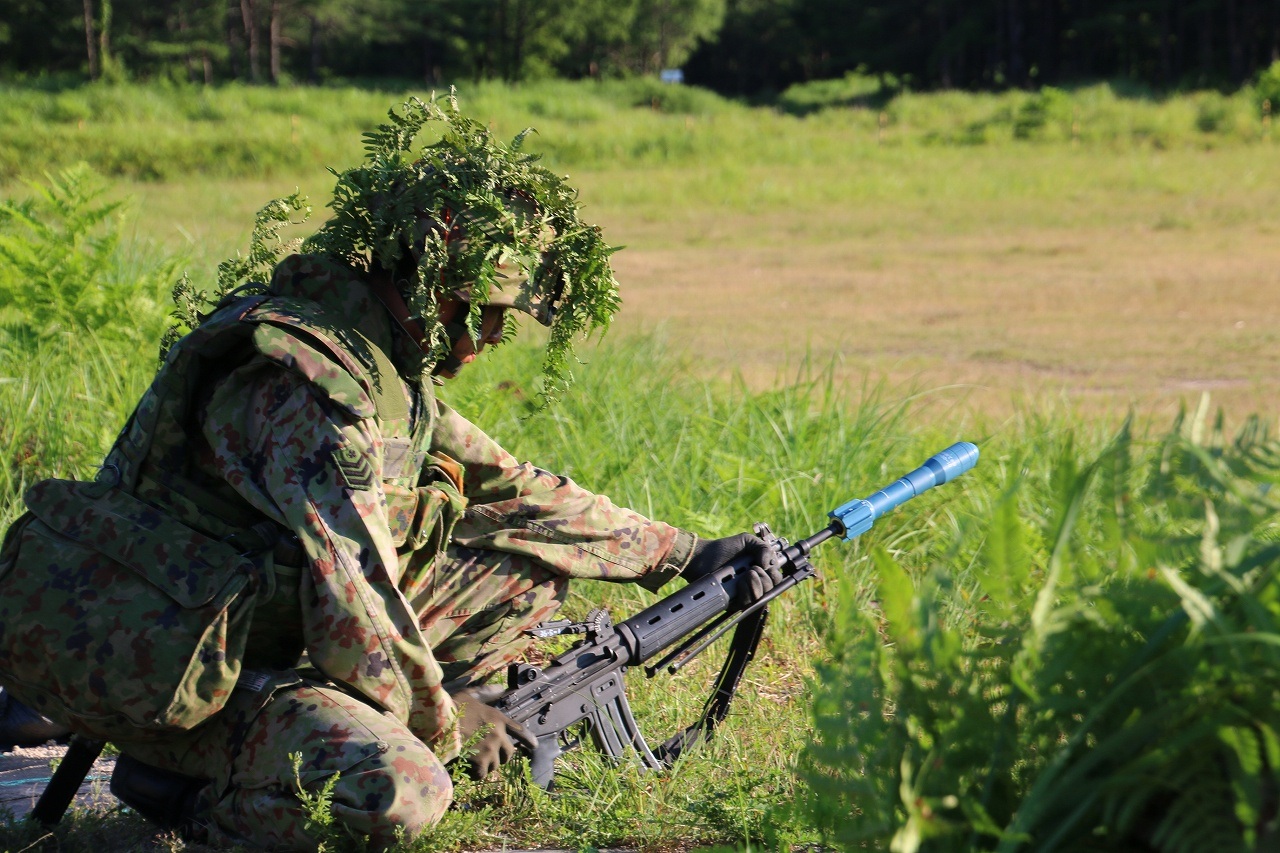
- A JGSDF soldier in the 36IR with the Type 89 with the Type 06 attached.
- Type: Rifle grenade launcher attachment
- Place of origin: Japan

Service history
- In service: 2006 - Present
- Wars: None

Production history
- Designer: Ground Research and Development Command
- Manufacturer: Daikin Industries, Ltd. (Defense Systems Division)

The Type 06 rifle grenade (06式小銃てき弾, Maru-roku-shiki Shōjū Tekidan) is a rifle grenade used by the JGSDF. It can be launched from the Howa Type 89 or Howa Type 64 rifles without other attachments.

== History ==
The JGSDF did not adopt the US-made M203 grenade launcher for general use after a thorough examination. Development of the Type 06 rifle grenade began in 1998 by the JGSDF Ground Research and Development Command after evaluations were done in 2001 and in 2005. The Type 06 was finished and adopted by the JGSDF in 2006, being manufactured by Daikin Industries under its Defense Systems Division.

The Type 06 had been fired first in exercises done by the JGSDF's 3rd Mechanized Infantry Regiment. It has been subsequently shown in various war game exercises.

== Description ==
The grenade does not need a launching attachment, because it was designed for riflemen and not for grenadiers. However, a simplified aiming sight can be attached. It contains a HEAT warhead for defeating tank armor. It is also equipped with a built-in time fuse for safety upon failure of the contact fuse.

== See also ==
- Rifle grenade
