= Type 66 helmet =

Japanese-made combat helmet based on the M1 helmet

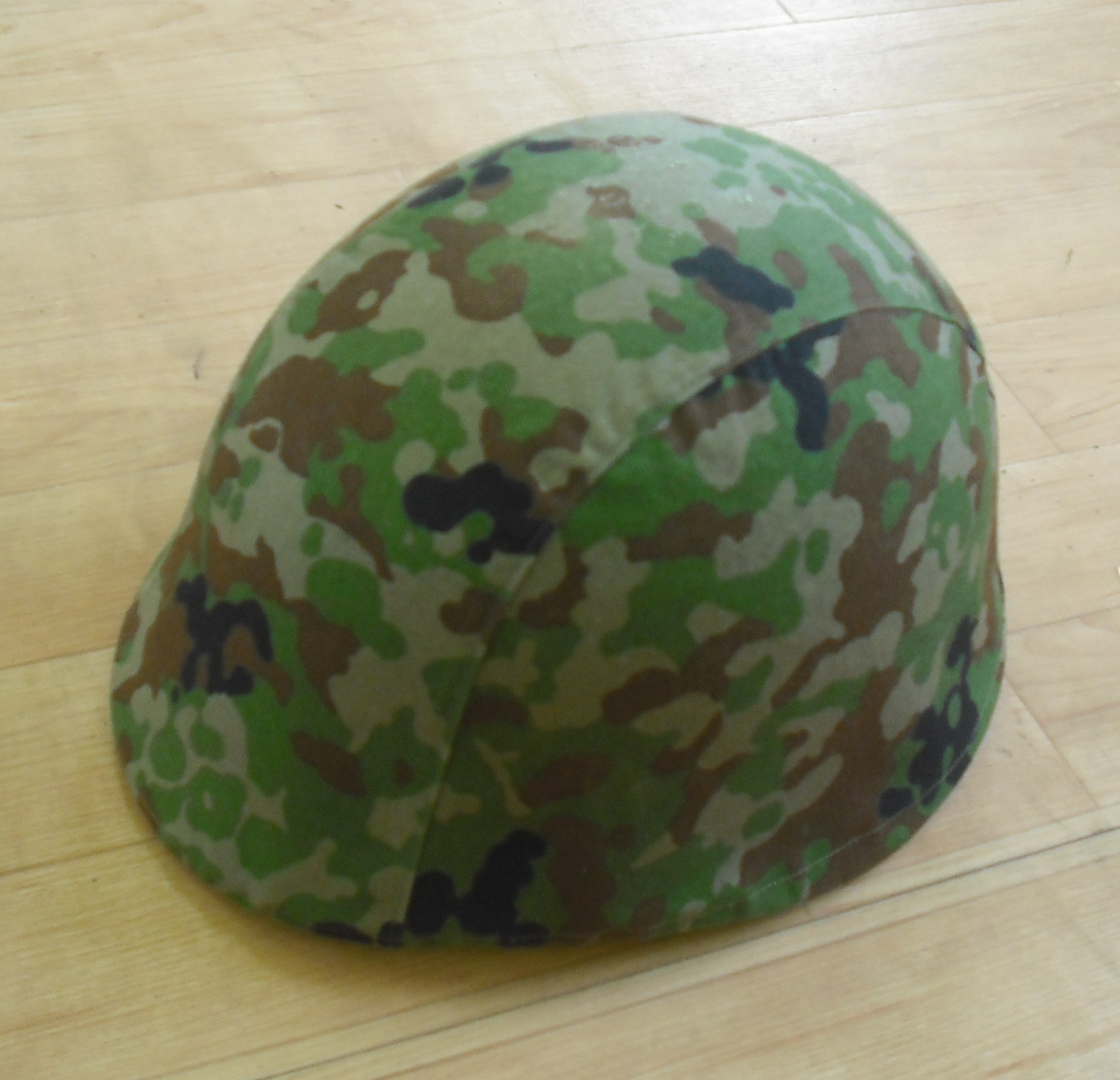
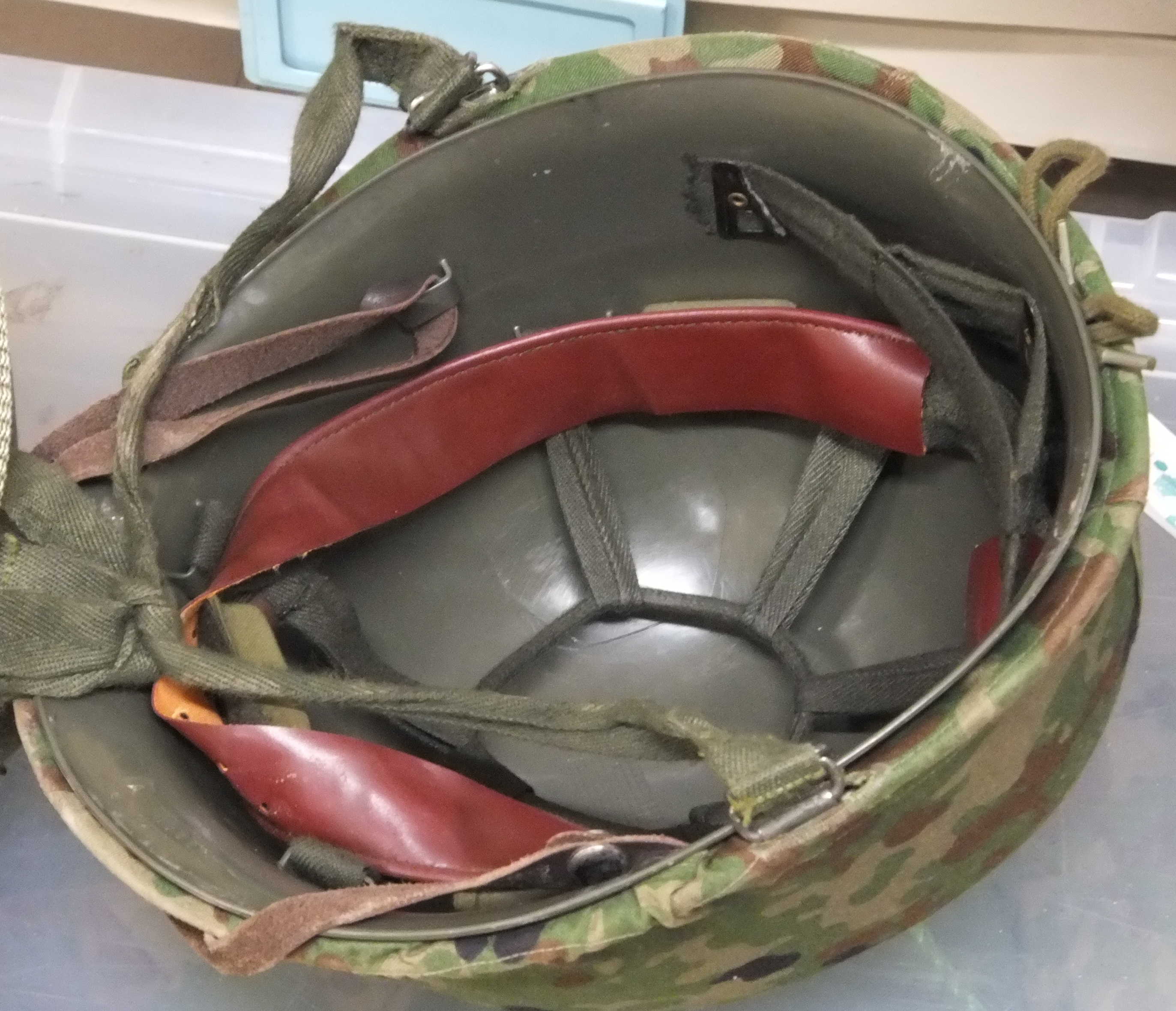
- The Type 66 helmet with the JGSDF Type II helmet cover (Left); The Type 66's helmet liner (Right)
- Type: Combat helmet
- Place of origin: Japan

Service history
- In service: 1966-Present
- Used by: Japan

Production history
- Designer: Major Harold G. Sydenham
- Manufacturer: Kawasaki Steel Corporation (currently JFE Steel)

Specifications
- Weight: 1.4 kg (3.1 lb)

The Type 66 (66式鉄帽, Rokurokushikitetsubou) is a Combat helmet that was used by the Japanese Self-Defense Force after the adoption of the M1 helmet, supplied by the United States when the former National Police Reserve was established. It has not been exported out of Japan since it was adopted by the JSDF.

In the JSDF, it is known as Teppachi.

== History ==
The Type 66 helmet was adopted by the JSDF in 1966, replacing the numerous M1 helmets supplied to them by the US. This is due to meeting Japanese requirements, since their typical head size cannot always fit underneath an M1.

It is mostly replaced by the Type 88 helmet in frontline service from 1988 onwards.

== Design ==
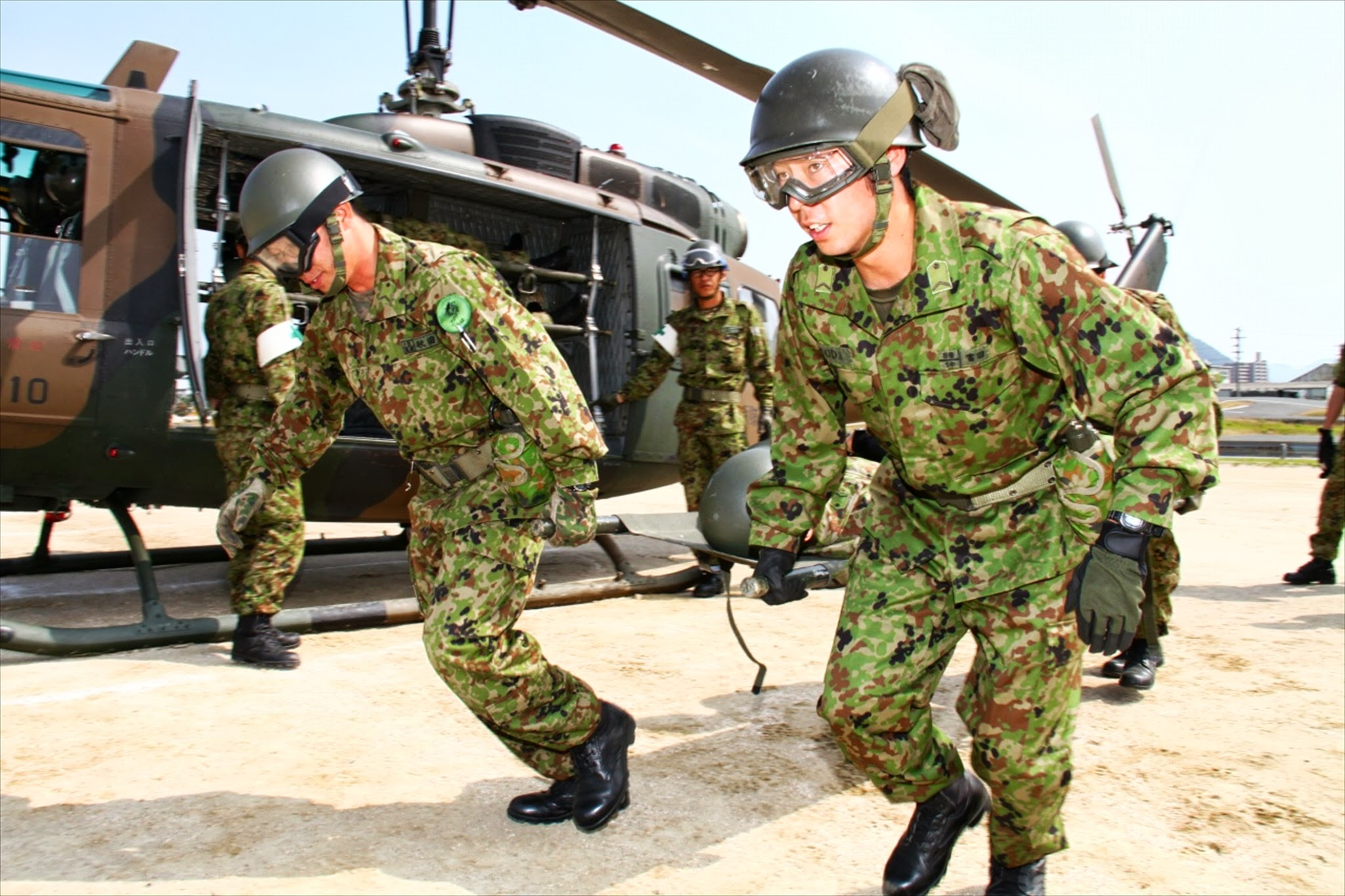
JGSDF soldiers of the 8th Infantry Regiment practice carrying a mock casualty during exercises while wearing Type 66 helmets.

The material of the helmet liner is simple molded resin. The total weight of the outer shell and helmet liner is 1.4 kilograms with the shell made out of manganese steel. The Type 66 can take various helmet covers and be equipped with removable chin straps. Its construction is based on the M1.

The Type 66 is still in use in non-combat missions, training exercises, parades and in the reserve forces.
