= Howa Type 20 =

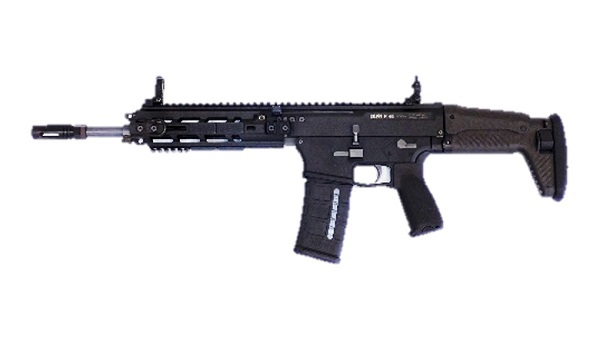
- Full view of the Howa Type 20
- Type: Assault rifle
- Place of origin: Japan

Service history
- In service: 2019–present
- Used by: Japan Ground Self-Defense Force

Production history
- Designer: Harada Toshihiko (Original design); Kei Koyama (Original design); Koji Iwata (Original & current design); Kazuhiro Kuroda (Original & current design)
- Designed: 2015
- Manufacturer: Howa
- Unit cost: $2,600
- Produced: 2020–present

Specifications
- Mass: 3.5 kg (7.7 lb)
- Length: 780 mm (31 in) (stock collapsed); 850 mm (33 in) (stock extended)
- Barrel length: 330 mm (13 in)
- Cartridge: 5.56×45mm NATO
- Action: Gas operated short stroke piston
- Rate of fire: 650–850 rounds/min
- Muzzle velocity: 850m/s
- Effective firing range: 500m
- Feed system: 30 round 5.56x45mm STANAG magazine
- Sights: Iron sights Optical sights can be mounted on rail

The Howa Type 20 Assault Rifle (20式小銃, ni-maru-shiki-shōjū), referred to as the Type 20 5.56mm Rifle (20式5.56mm小銃, ni-maru-shiki-go-ten-go-roku-miri-shōjū), is an assault rifle developed for the Japan Ground Self-Defense Force by Howa.

The first examples were purchased in 2019, and it is intended to eventually replace the Howa Type 89 in general service.

== History ==
It was reported that the Type 20 was selected in 2019 over the Heckler & Koch HK416 and the FN SCAR-L.

On May 18, 2020, the Ministry of Defense announced that the rifle would be designated as the Type 20. It was also announced that the Type 20 will first be issued to soldiers in the Amphibious Rapid Deployment Brigade.

In the DSEI 2023 convention, Howa Deputy General Manager Kimura stated some foreign countries have inquired about possibly getting the Type 20 and the matter was referred to Japan's Acquisition, Technology & Logistics Agency (ATLA) and Howa representatives.

The Type 20 was seen overseas for the first time in the 2023 iteration of Exercise Talisman Sabre, which took place from July to August 2023 with the ARDB.

== Development ==
In August 2014, it was reported that the JGSDF was looking for a new rifle to replace the Type 89. Initial candidates to replace the Type 89s include the Heckler & Koch G36, Heckler & Koch HK416, Steyr AUG, FN SCAR, and a new rifle developed by Howa.

In 2015, the Japanese Ministry of Defense procured various foreign made rifles for testing purposes and contracted with Howa to test their domestic rifle. The procurement contract is shown as:

2014 Monthly contract information / voluntary contract (above standard) (Excel file) (Translated to English)
Name	Quantity	Contract day	Price (¥)
Small arms (for testing) (M type)	3	1/29/2015	5,853,600
Small arms (for test) (S type, 516)	8	2/2/2015	12,798,000
Small arms (for testing) (S type, 716)	7	2/2/2015	11,394,000
Test small arms (domestic)	1	2/23/2015	98,425,800
Small arms (for testing) (G type, V)	5	3/13/2015	2,311,200
Small arms (for testing) (HK type)	5	3/13/2015	6,858,000
Small arms (for testing) (SC type, H)	5	3/31/2015	5,508,000
Small arms (for test) (SC type, L)	5	3/31/2015	4,398,840

The small arms "S type, 516 and 716" are the SIG516 and SIG716, "G type, V" is the G36V, "HK type" is likely the HK416 or HK417, and "SC type, H and L" is the SCAR-H and SCAR-L. It is unknown what rifle is small arms "M type".

At the same time, Howa filed a patent on the design for their rifle on 15 May 2015. Furthermore, the design was patented under Japan's Design Act (Article 14) which allows the design to be kept in secret for up to three years. An updated design was later patented under the same law on 25 September 2015.

In 2018, the Ministry of Defense procured another batch of small arms for testing. The procurement contract is shown as:

2018 Monthly contract information / voluntary contract (above standard) (Excel file) (Translated to English)
Name	Quantity	Contract day	Price (¥)
Test small arms (YS type)	8	5/30/2018	10,411,200
Test small arms (K type)	8	6/1/2018	50,137,920
Test small arms (YH type)	8	7/10/2018	14,715,000

The rifles were later revealed to be the Type 20 (then designated as HOWA 5.56), HK416 and SCAR-L following an announcement on 6 December 2019 that the Type 20 has been selected over the other two rifles. A follow-up report stated that two evaluations were conducted on the rifle in 2018. The first evaluation focused on the weapon's performance on land such as effective range and accuracy. The second evaluation compared the weapon's performance, logistics and cost to the other two rifles.

Since all three rifles satisfied the JGSDF's requirements, the Type 20 was selected due to having the highest score based on the second evaluation. The unit price for mass production is stated to be at ¥280,000 including maintenance and operation costs. The estimated life cycle cost is ¥43.9 billion if 150,000 units are procured.

The first batch of rifles (3,283 units) were purchased for ¥900 million in the FY 2020 defense budget, equivalent to $2,600 per rifle.

As of 2023, the Type 20's prototype was placed on display at the JGSDF Ordnance School.

== Design details ==
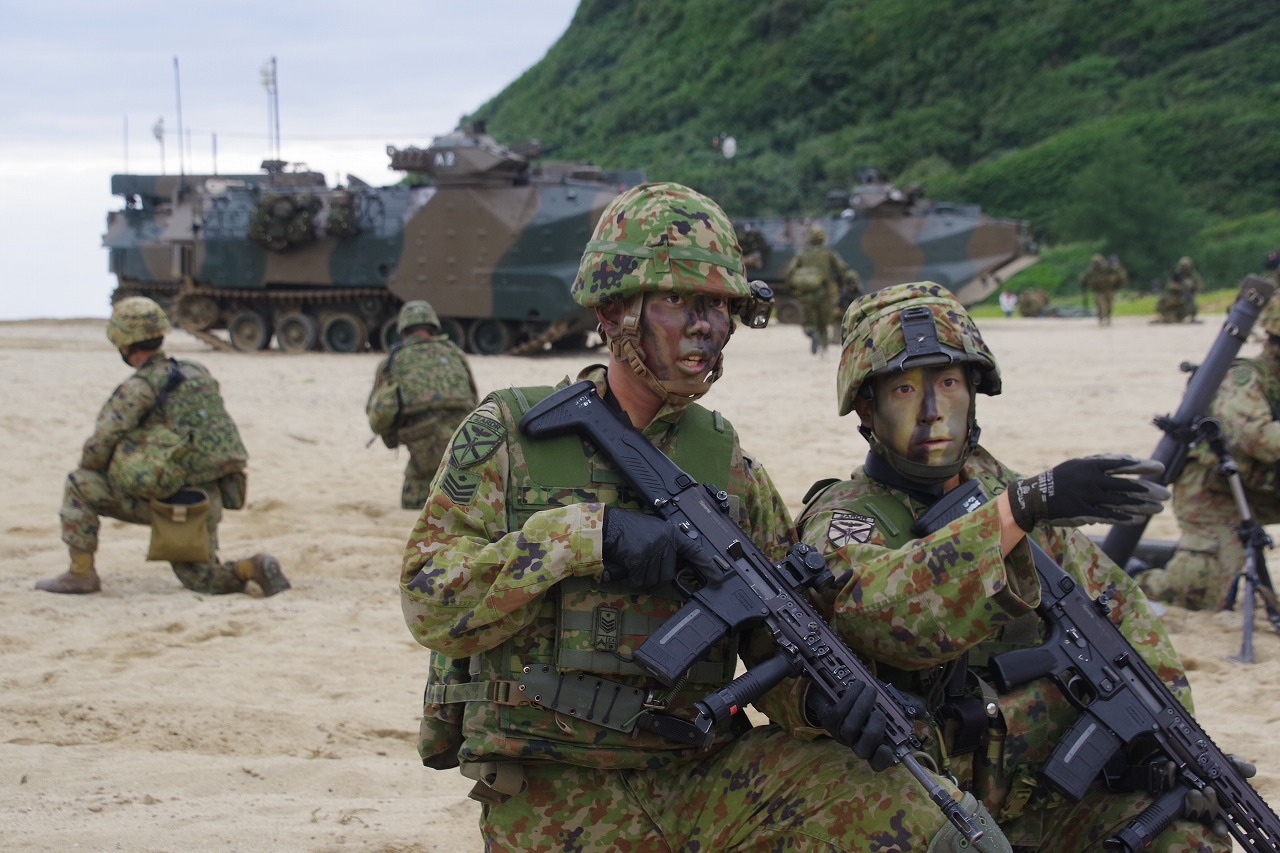
ARDB soldiers during a beach landing exercise in 2023, equipped with Type 20s

The Type 20 is said by the Ministry of Defense to possess better environment durability, fire power and extensibility over the Type 89. This is needed as water-resistance is essential for amphibious operations in the southwestern islands of Japan. One key difference it has over the Type 89 is the addition of multiple accessory rails, making it the first Japanese rifle to come with these as standard. The magazine is also believed to be STANAG compatible. The rifle features a telescoping stock, an ambidextrous safety selector, and operates via short-stroke piston. Compared to its original design, the current design of the Type 20 retains much of the same characteristics with only some notable changes. The barrel length has been shortened slightly, and the hand guard has been redesigned to feature an M-LOK rail design. The side rails have been extended, foldable iron sights were added, and the stock features a shoulder pad similar to the one seen on the HK416.

Because of the radical and modern design shift the rifle has over its predecessor, there are some speculations on how it got its design. One speculation is that the design was possibly influenced by various foreign made rifles; as Japan has experience procuring and utilizing a number of foreign rifles, i.e. the Special Forces Group. As such, the design of the Type 20 has been compared to the Heckler & Koch HK433; with some observers believing the rifle possesses similar dimensions and functionality to the SCAR. Another design influence is speculated to come from the experience Howa has gained from developing the ACIES variants of the Type 89.

The rifle weighs 3.5 kg and has a total length between 780 mm to 850 mm depending on the extension of the stock. The barrel length is 330 mm. Unlike the Type 89, the Type 20 lacks a three-round burst setting as it was deemed unnecessary. The rifle is compatible with the same bayonet used by the Type 89, and, according to a Ministry of Defense press conference, the rifle can be used with the Beretta GLX-160 grenade launcher. The GLX-160 in Japanese service will be modified so that it can be mounted underneath the barrel. The rifle was also showcased with a foregrip that features a miniature bipod and a DEON MARCH 8x optical sight.

When the Type 20 was first deployed, JSDF troops were seen with privately-purchased optics, vertical grips, and other accessories attached to their rifles, but as of 2023, the rifle was being deployed with officially-procured Aimpoint CompM5 red dot sights, Steiner Optics OTAL-C laser targeting devices, and SureFire M300C tactical flashlights in addition to the foregrip and optical sight stated above.

The Type 20 was made to be fully ambidextrous to accommodate both left- and right-handed shooters. It is also made to be resistant to corrosion for exposure to seawater.

The weapon fires the J-3 high-power cartridge, a 5.56mm round developed specifically for the Type 20. It weighs 12 g (0.4 oz) and is made from steel and red brass using double-base powder propelling a bullet with a monolithic, high-strength material core. The J-3 was made to be powerful enough to penetrate modern body armor despite the rifle's relatively short barrel length, and also less expensive to produce and procure compared to the ammunition produced for the Type 89.

== Users ==
Japan

Fiscal year	Cost (¥ billion)	Operators			Notes
Fiscal year	Cost (¥ billion)	JGSDF Japan Ground Self-Defense Force	JMSDF Japan Maritime Self-Defense Force	JASDF Japan Air Self-Defense Force	Notes
2027	¥ 0.0	–	–	–	
2026	¥ 5.6	10,000	205	2,946	13,151 weapons
2025	¥ 5.4	10,000	207	2,702	12,909 weapons
2024	¥ 4.3	9,927	–	–	
2023	¥ 3.3	8,577	–	–	
2022	¥ 0.8	2,928	–	–	
2021	¥ 0.9	3,342	–	–	
2020	¥ 0.9	3,283	–	–	
Total	¥ 21.2 (+ 0)	48,057 (+ 0)	412 (+ 0)	5,648 (+ 0)	–
Total	¥ 21.2 (+ 0)	54,117 (+ 0)			–

Budget request

== See also ==
- AK-12
- CZ 805 BREN
- Daewoo Precision Industries K2
- M7 rifle
- QBZ-191
- T112 assault rifle
