= Hitachi Type 73 =

Type 73
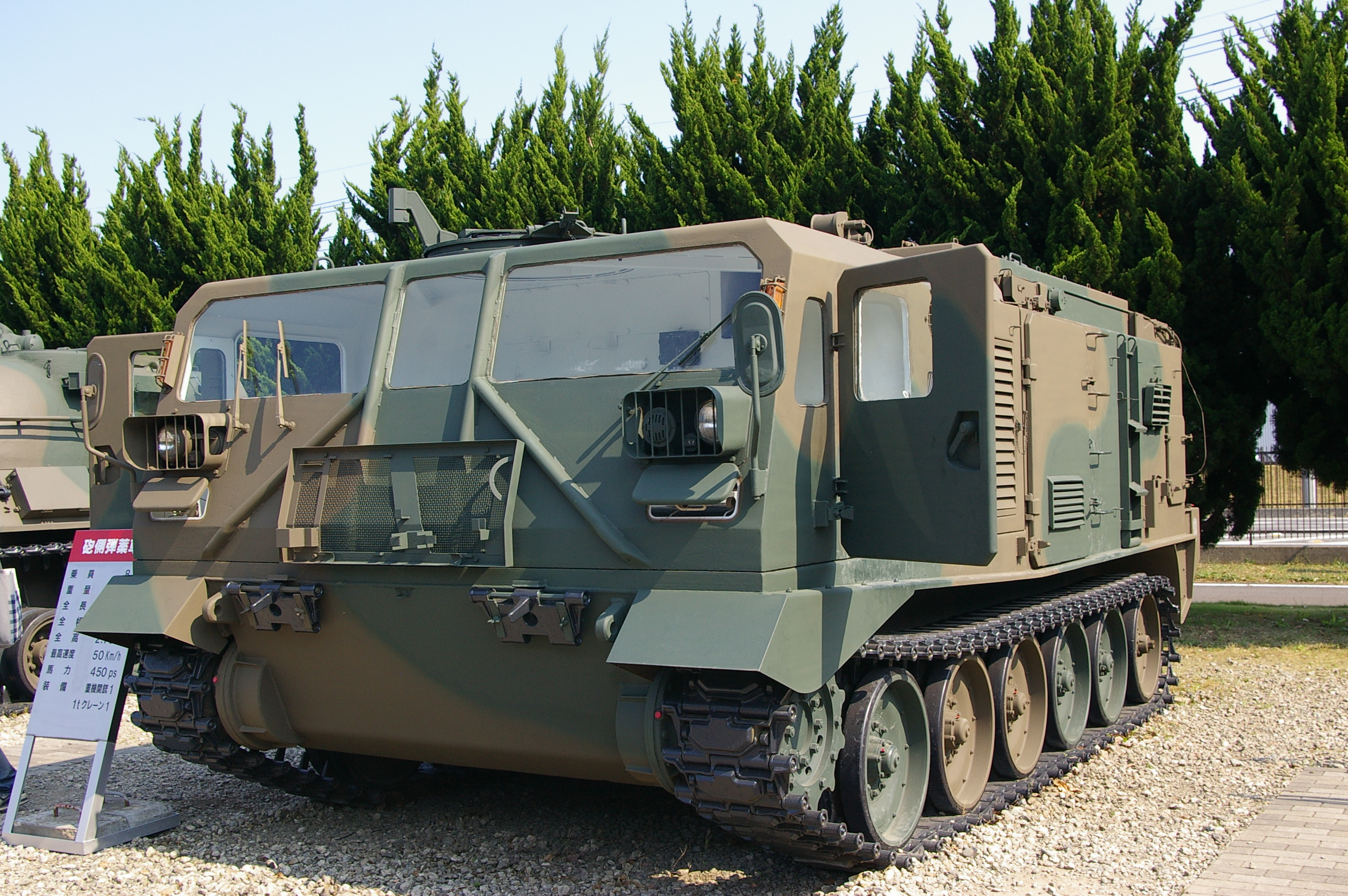
- Type: Artillery tractor
- Place of origin: Japan

Service history
- Used by: Japan Ground Self-Defense Force

Production history
- Designed: 1974
- Manufacturer: Hitachi

Specifications
- Mass: 19.8 t
- Length: 6.13 m
- Width: 2.95 m
- Height: 2.30 m
- Crew: 1 + 11
- Armor: none
- Main armament: 12.7mm anti-aircraft machine gun
- Engine: Mitsubishi ZF6 six-cylinder air-cooled diesel engine 400 hp (298 kW)
- Operational range: 300 km
- Maximum speed: 45 km/h

The Type 73 is an artillery tractor used by the Japan Ground Self-Defense Force.

== History ==
The first production of the Type 73 was in 1974, built by Hitachi as a domestic replacement for the American M4 and M8 high-speed tractors. It was never produced in large numbers, as self-propelled artillery became the new focus.

== Construction ==
The cab and gun crew compartments of the Type 73 are fully enclosed steel, with ammunition carried in a separate compartment at the rear. A 400 hp Mitsubishi diesel engine powers full tracks, and armament is a single 12.7mm anti-aircraft machine gun.

== Usage ==
The Type 73 was intended to tow weapons such as the 155 mm Long Tom gun and the M115 203 mm howitzer. It can also be fitted with a dozer blade, or alternatively, the Type 92 mine roller.
