= Sakura-class patrol ship =

Japanese patrol ship class

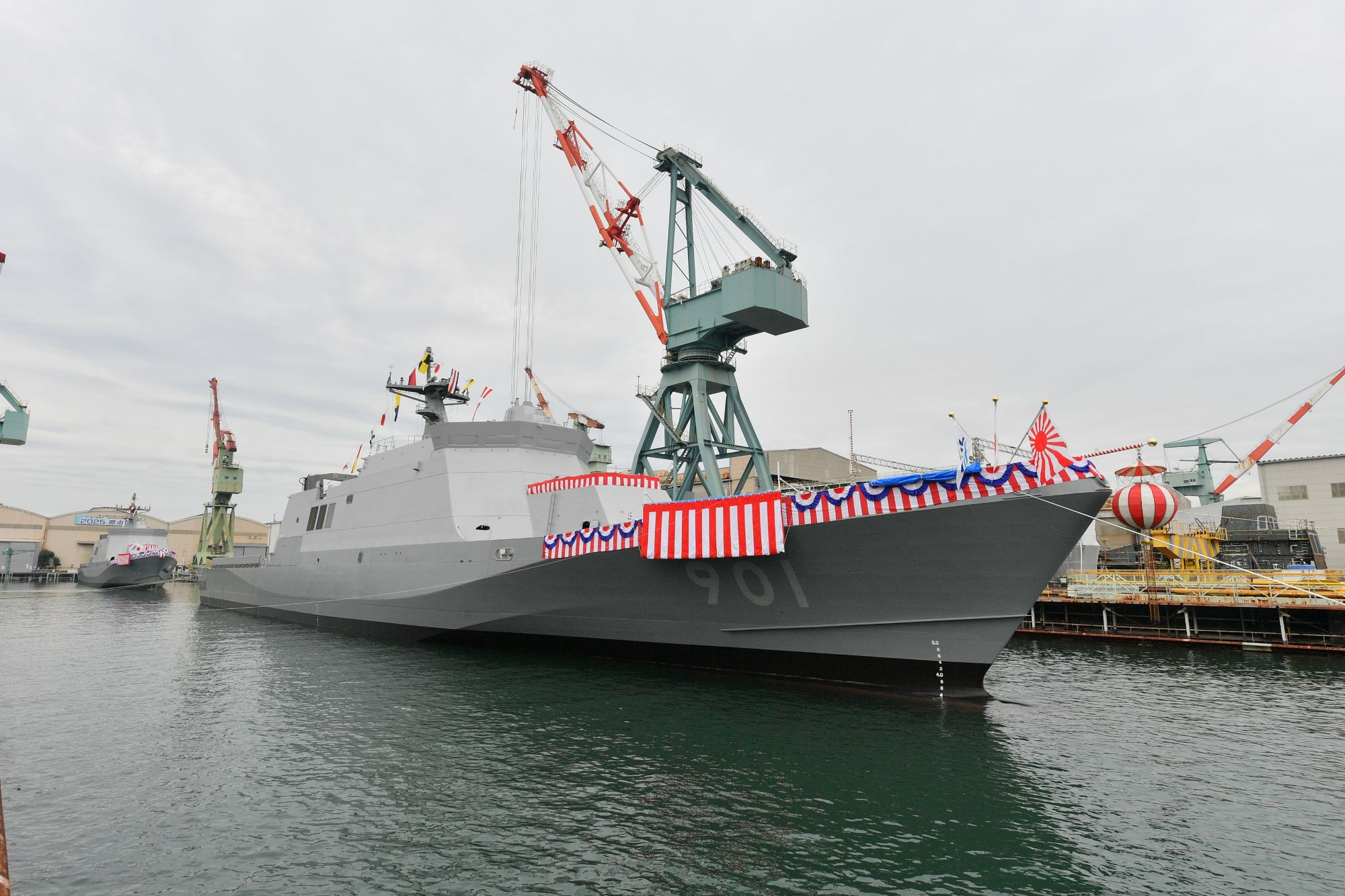
- Lead ship Sakura during her launch ceremony; sister ship Tachibana is seen behind her

Class overview
- Builders: Japan Marine United (JMU); Mitsubishi Heavy Industries (MHI)
- Operators: Japan Maritime Self-Defense Force
- Preceded by: Hayabusa class
- Built: February 2025–present
- In commission: March 2027 (scheduled)
- Planned: 12
- Building: 4

General characteristics
- Type: Offshore patrol vessel (OPV)
- Displacement: 1,920 long tons (1,950 t) standard
- Length: 95 m (311 ft 8 in)
- Beam: 12 m (39 ft 4 in)
- Draft: 4.2 m (13 ft 9 in)
- Propulsion: Combined diesel-electric and diesel (CODLAD)
- Speed: 25 kn (29 mph; 46 km/h)
- Complement: 30
- Armament: 30 mm caliber autocannon
- Aircraft carried: Mitsubishi SH-60J/K/L or Shield AI MQ-35 V-BAT
- Aviation facilities: Multi-purpose hangar and landing deck
- Notes: Containerized (ISO) mission modules, stern crane, launch and recovery system (LARS)

The Sakura-class patrol ships consist of 12 OPV-type patrol vessels planned to be operated by the Japan Maritime Self-Defense Force (JMSDF).

Amidst the rising tensions over the Senkaku Islands and to replace older vessels such as the Hayabusa-class patrol boats, in 2022, the Japan Maritime Self-Defense Force launched the Next-Generation Offshore Patrol Vessel (OPV) program. Construction of the Sakura-class began as part of the program in 2023, and as of March 2026, the first four ships have been launched.

== Background and operational concept ==
On 30 June 2022, the Japan Ministry of Defense (MOD) announced the construction of 12 offshore patrol vessels (OPV) for the Japanese Maritime Self-Defense Force (JMSDF) at a cost of ¥ 9 billion (US$66 million) per ship. Japan Marine United Corporation (JMU) is the prime contractor for this program with Mitsubishi Heavy Industries (MHI) chosen to be the subcontractor. Both JMU and MHI as well as Mitsui Engineering & Shipbuilding had submitted preliminary designs for the proposed next-generation OPVs.

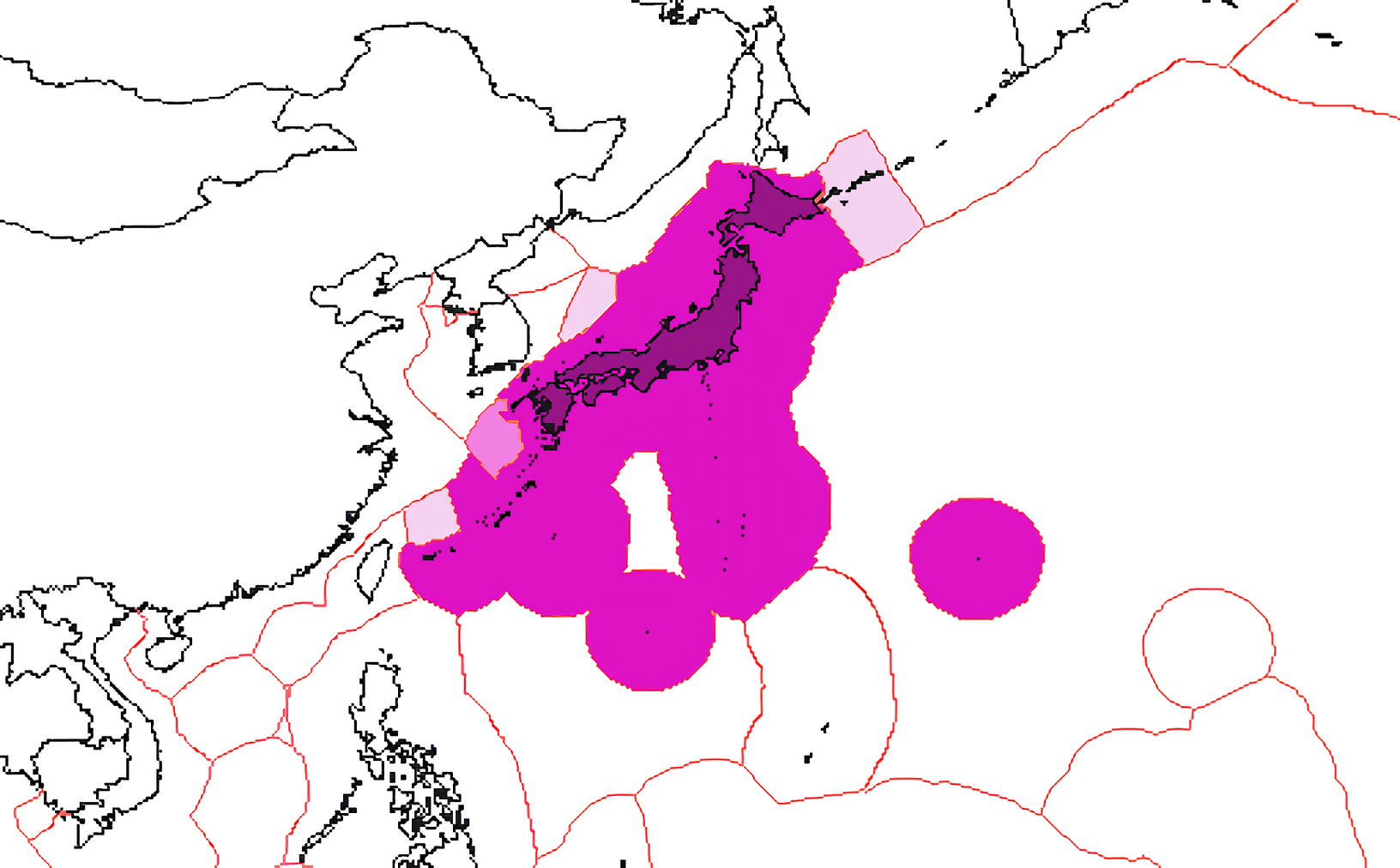
Exclusive economic zone of Japan. Disputed areas are marked in lighter color.

According to a video release in July 2021 by the Ministry of Defense's Acquisition, Technology & Logistics Agency (ATLA), the purpose of this OPV program is to provide enhanced maritime security, particularly around the southwestern Ryukyu Islands and the East China Sea, including the disputed territories over the Senkaku Islands (See map).

The Sakura-class will replace the Abukuma-class destroyer escorts and Hayabusa-class patrol boats currently deployed in patrol missions and as escorts for warships belonging to other navies in the Sea of Japan, East China Sea, and Pacific Ocean. The OPV will be equipped for intelligence, surveillance, and reconnaissance, since its armament is limited and will be primarily used in patrol sorties.

Four ships were initially scheduled to be introduced by fiscal year 2024, followed by 12 within the next five years. The first four OPVs are part of the 2023 Defense budget of the Japanese MOD.

== Design ==
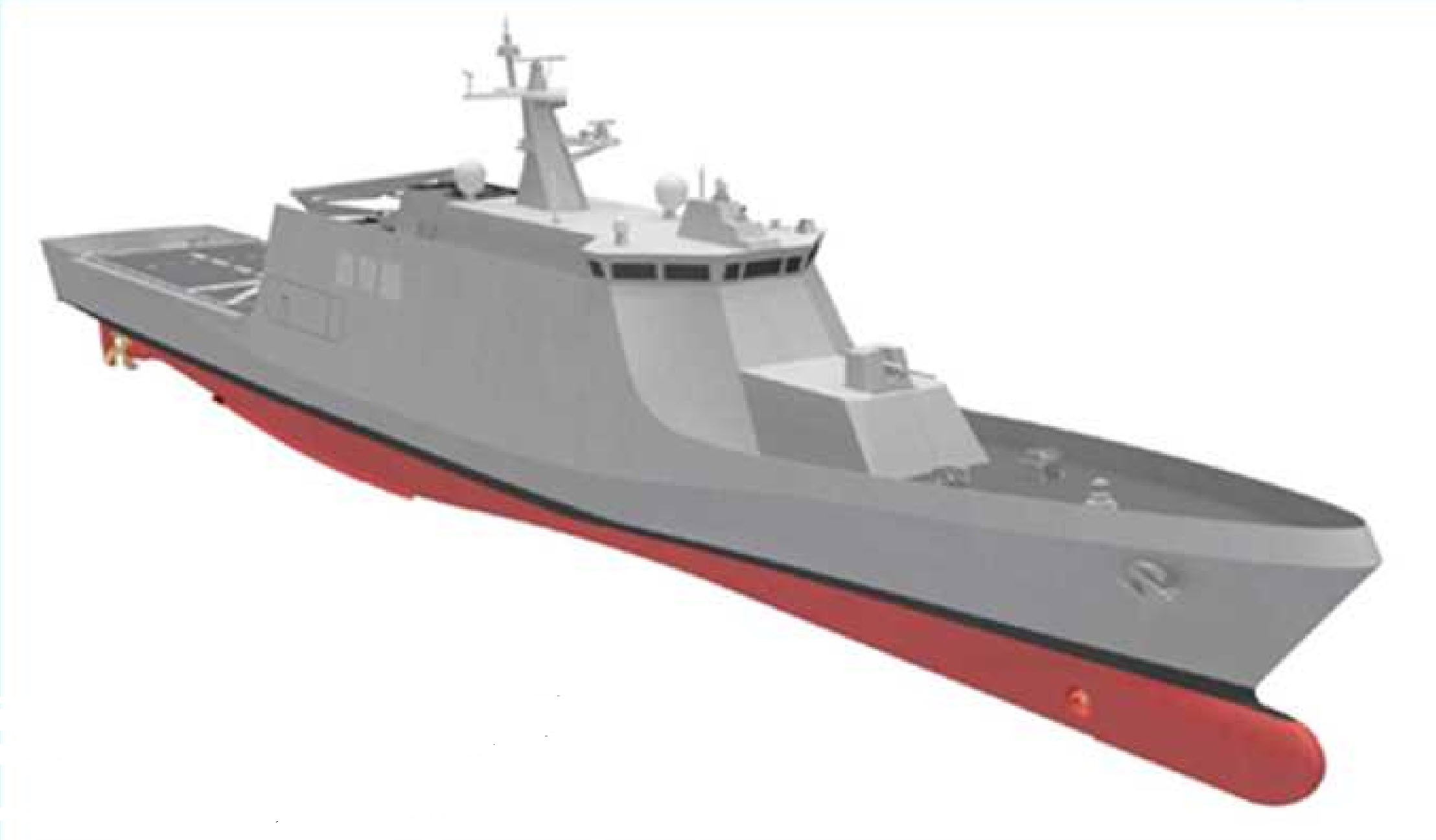
Official artist conception of the Sakura-class from 2022

The Sakura-class vessels are highly automated and configurable to meet a variety of missions to provide sustained intelligence, surveillance, and reconnaissance in maritime patrol surrounding Japan. Japan Marine United was contracted to build all 12 vessels for the JMSDF, starting from 1 April 2023. The vessels each displace 1,920 long tons (1,950 t) while measuring about 95 m (311 ft 8 in) in length and 12 m (39 ft 4 in) in width. The OPV will be fitted with the UNIted COmbined Radio aNtenna (UNICORN) NORA-50 integration mast and Tactical Air Navigation System (TACAN), the former of which has tactical data antennas contained in its bar-shaped dome. ATLA stated that UNICORN, which the Mogami-class frigates under procurement at the time is also being equipped with, has a decreased radar cross section (RCS) due to its stealthy outline.

== Equipment ==
=== Ship & power systems ===
Each OPV features a CODLAD propulsion system, wherein a diesel engine and an electric motor power a single propeller, providing a maximum speed in excess of 20 kn (23 mph; 37 km/h). The conception artwork also depicts a bow thruster system. Each OPV will be equipped with a 30-mm naval gun mounted on the foredeck for self-defense. The aft section of the vessel is equipped with a crane near the multi-purpose hangar and rear deck for helicopters or unmanned aerial vehicle (UAV) operations. The stern is also fitted with a launch and recovery system.

=== Mission modules ===
The OPVs have ISO containerization capabilities for mission modules that can be installed on board. Minesweeping-related equipment, such as the Autonomous Surface Vehicle (ASV) and Expendable Mine Disposal (EMD), were part of the preliminary design work by Mitsui Engineering & Shipbuilding and displayed at the 2019 MAST Asia defense trade-show, but no decision was made on the final mine counter-measures (MCM) suite.

== Procurement ==
According to its published budget overview, for Fiscal Year 2023, the Japanese Ministry of Defense allocated 35.7 billion yen ($230 million USD) for the first four ships in the next-generation OPV program. The keels for the first four vessels were laid down at Japan Marine United's Yokohama shipyard Isogo Works, with the first two being launched on 13 November 2025, and second two launched on 13 March 2026. All four vessels are planned to be commissioned in March 2027.

== Ships in the class ==
Pennant No.	Name	Home port	Unit	Shipyard	Plan	Laid down	Launched	Commissioned	Status	Note
OPV-901	JS Sakura	TBD	TBD	JMU	2023	14 February 2025	13 November 2025	March 2027 (scheduled)	On sea trials	
OPV-902	JS Tachibana	TBD	TBD	JMU	2023	14 February 2025	13 November 2025	March 2027 (scheduled)	Under construction	
OPV-903	JS Hinoki	TBD	TBD	JMU	2023	14 February 2025	13 March 2026	March 2027 (scheduled)	Under construction	
OPV-904	JS Sugi	TBD	TBD	JMU	2023	14 February 2025	13 March 2026	March 2027 (scheduled)	Under construction	
TBD	Unit 5	TBD	TBD	TBD	TBD	TBD	TBD	TBD	Pending	
TBD	Unit 6	TBD	TBD	TBD	TBD	TBD	TBD	TBD	Pending	
TBD	Unit 7	TBD	TBD	TBD	TBD	TBD	TBD	TBD	Pending	
TBD	Unit 8	TBD	TBD	TBD	TBD	TBD	TBD	TBD	Pending	
TBD	Unit 9	TBD	TBD	TBD	TBD	TBD	TBD	TBD	Pending	
TBD	Unit 10	TBD	TBD	TBD	TBD	TBD	TBD	TBD	Pending	
TBD	Unit 11	TBD	TBD	TBD	TBD	TBD	TBD	TBD	Pending	
TBD	Unit 12	TBD	TBD	TBD	TBD	TBD	TBD	TBD	Pending	

=== Naming conventions ===
Ships of the JMSDF are known as Japan Ships (自衛艦; Ji'ei-Kan; prefix JS) and are classified according to the warship type. Sakura-class offshore patrol vessels are named after tree species. In 2025, journalist Kosuke Takahashi confirmed that the next-generation offshore patrol vessels will have a new type designation OPV.

== See also ==
- Future Multi Purpose Trimaran concept

== Bibliography ==
- "Budget for Fundamental Strengthening of Defense Capabilities FY Reiwa 5 (2023) Budget Overview" (PDF). Budget overview. Japanese Ministry of Defense. 23 December 2022. "in Japanese (防衛力整備計画)."
- "Defense Programs and Budget of Japan FY Reiwa 5 (2023) Budget Overview" (PDF). Budget overview. Japanese Ministry of Defense. 23 December 2022. "In Japanese (防衛力抜本的強化「元年」予算)."
