= Missile defense systems by country =

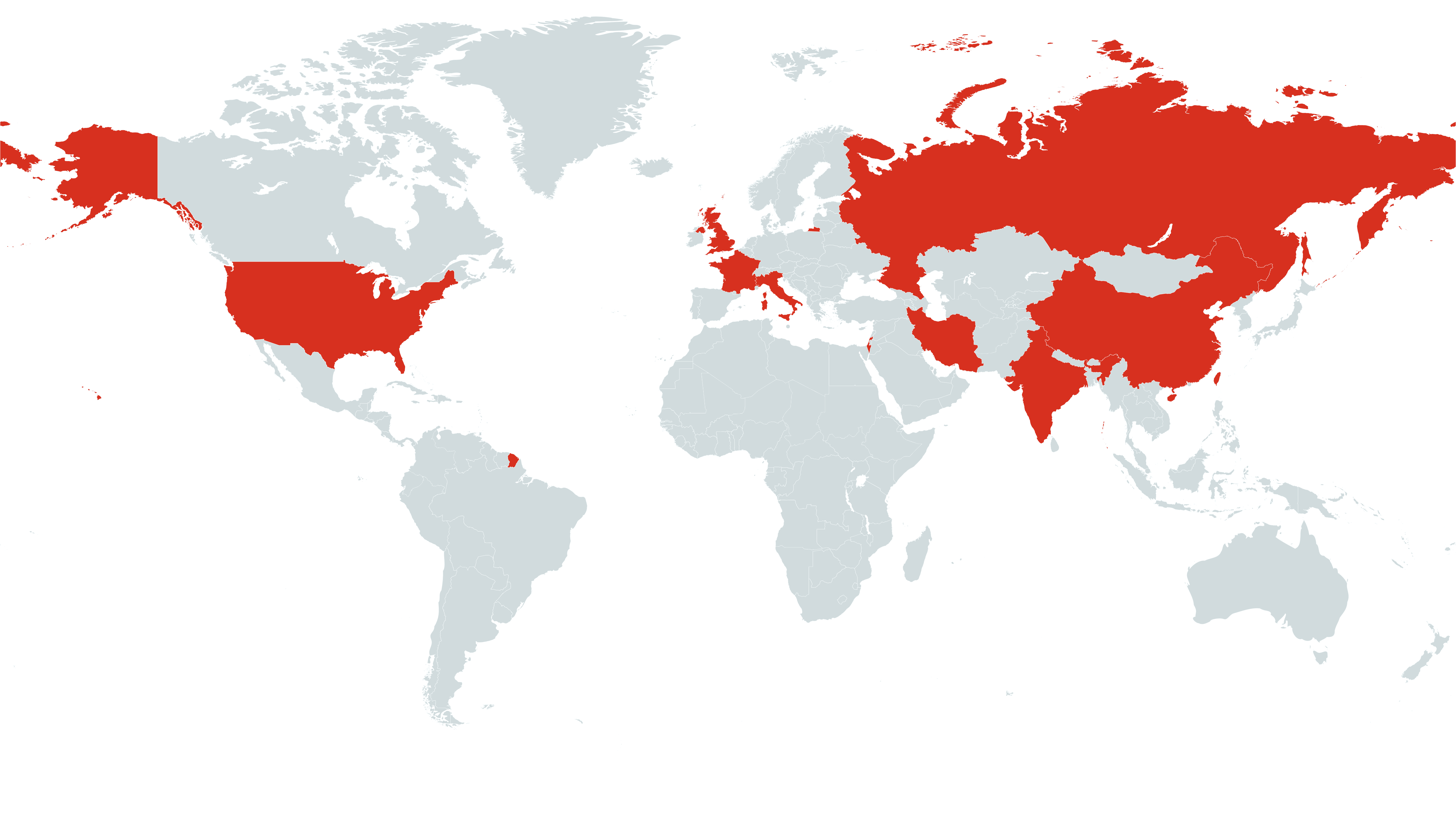
Countries which developed missile defence system

Missile defense systems are a type of missile defense intended to shield a country against incoming missiles, such as intercontinental ballistic missiles (ICBMs) or other ballistic missiles. United States, Russia, China, India, France, Israel, Italy, United Kingdom and Iran have all developed missile defense systems.

== Definitions ==
- The term "Missile defense system" broadly means a system that provides any defense against any missile type (conventional or nuclear) by any country.
- Any mechanism which can detect and then destroy a missile before it can cause any harm is called a missile defence system (MDS).

The role of defense against nuclear missiles has been a heated military and political topic for several decades. However, missile defense is no longer limited to interception of strategic nuclear weapons. The gradual development and proliferation of missile technology has blurred the line between the technologies for the interception of tactical missiles (usually short to intermediate range with non-nuclear payloads) and the interception of strategic missiles (usually long ranged with nuclear payloads). High-performance tactical ballistic missiles carrying non-nuclear payloads now have the ability to affect strategic balance in conflict zones. Likewise, high-performance tactical missile defense systems can now influence force deployment strategies.

== China ==
The People's Liberation Army of the People's Republic of China operates multiple layers of missile defense systems.

During the Cold War, China initiated Project 640, a ballistic missile defense project, which resulted in the testing of the experimental FJ ABM series. The project was ultimately cancelled.

Four versions of the S-300 are in service: the PMU, PMU1 and PMU2, and the navalised S-300FM Rif. Based on the S-300PMU1, the Rif equips the PLAN's two Type 51C Luzhou air-defense destroyers, enabling them to contribute to the protection of a coastal site against SRBM attack. The S-300PMU2 has the best chance of intercepting an SRBM missile as it employs the 48N6E2 missile, which has a warhead optimized for destroying ballistic missiles, and better kinematics compared to earlier 48N6 missiles.

The HQ-9 provides terminal interception against short- and medium-range ballistic missile targets. It entered service in 2001. The latest variant, HQ-9C, has a large magazine depth.

The HQ-16 is effective in intercepting tactical ballistic missiles. The system entered service in 2008.

The HQ-19 is designed to intercept medium, intermediate, intercontinental ballistic missiles at terminal or mid-course phase. The missile system can also target satellites at the lower orbit. It entered operation in 2018.

The HQ-22 can provide interception against short-range ballistic missiles at their terminal phase. The system entered operation in 2019.

The HQ-26 is a naval-based ballistic missile defense system under development.

The HQ-29 is designed to intercept intermediate and intercontinental ballistic missiles, as well as targeting satellites. The system was announced in operation in 2025.

The Dong Neng-3 is an experimental mid-course interceptor designed for targeting intercontinental ballistic missiles and satellites under development.

On 11 January 2007 the Chinese successfully performed an anti-satellite missile test using a KT-1 (Note: described by the director of United States Defense Intelligence Agency as a SC-19 missile) missile with a Kinetic Kill Vehicle mounted.

In 2010, China successfully tested its exoatmospheric interception capabilities, being the second country after the United States to do so. The system was again successfully tested on 27 January 2013 and 8 September 2017.

== Europe ==
=== France, Italy, and UK ===
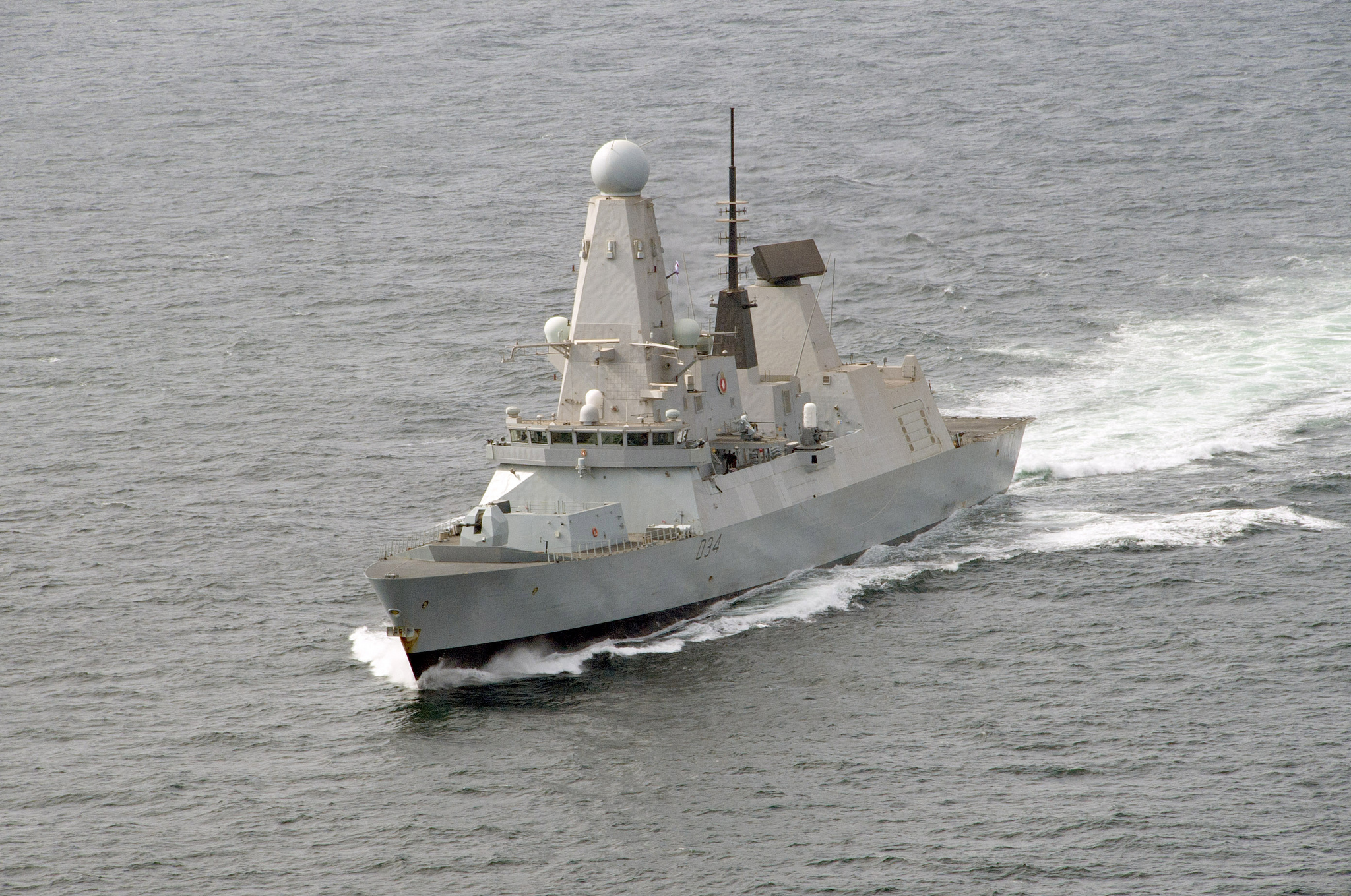
HMS Diamond (D34) a Royal Navy Type 45 destroyer equipped with the Sylver A-50 VLS and Aster 15 and 30 missiles. Diamond fired her missiles for the first time during May 2012 successfully intercepting a Mirach drone.

The UK, France and Italy developed a programme called PAAMS (also known as Sea Viper in the UK) in the late 1990s. It was developed to arm the Horizon-class frigate (a joint programme between the UK, France and Italy). The UK dropped out of the frigate programme after collective differences remained unsolved, and instead decided to design and build its own Type 45 destroyer which would still use the PAAMS missile system. France and Italy, following this departure, incorporated a ground-launched anti-ballistic missile system into the plans, and developed SAMPT – a truck-launched anti-ballistic missile system which used PAAMS technology.

=== Germany and other countries ===
Since October 2022, 22 European states have joined the German-led European Sky Shield Initiative for procuring and maintaining air defence systems collectively. European NATO members—most notably Germany—have begun adopting more layered and interoperable Integrated Air and Missile Defense (IAMD) architectures in response to growing threats from drones, cruise missiles, and ballistic systems. The concept draws from the U.S. IBCS approach but adapts it to a multinational, geographically dispersed alliance framework, often under the umbrella of NATO's Integrated Air and Missile Defence System (NATINAMDS). Additional offensive proposals include European Sky Shield for Ukraine, which would station European fighter jets beyond the frontlines of Ukraine, rather than ground-based systems alone.

== India ==
The Indian air defence network has two principal components – the 'Air Defence Ground Environment System' (ADGES) and the 'Base Air Defence Zones' (BADZ). The ADGES network provides for wide area radar coverage and permits the detection and interception of most aerial incursions into Indian airspace. The BADZ system is considerably more concentrated with radars, interceptors, SAMs and AAA units working together to provide an intense defensive barrier to attacks on vital targets.

The Indian Air Defence is deployed as a tiered system.

1. Indian Ballistic Missile Defence Programme
2. Long-range Air Defence – S-400, Project Kusha
3. Medium-range Air Defence – Barak 8, Akash NG
4. Short-range Air Defence (point defence) – QRSAM, Akash, S-125 Pechora, SPYDER and others

=== Ballistic missile defence ===
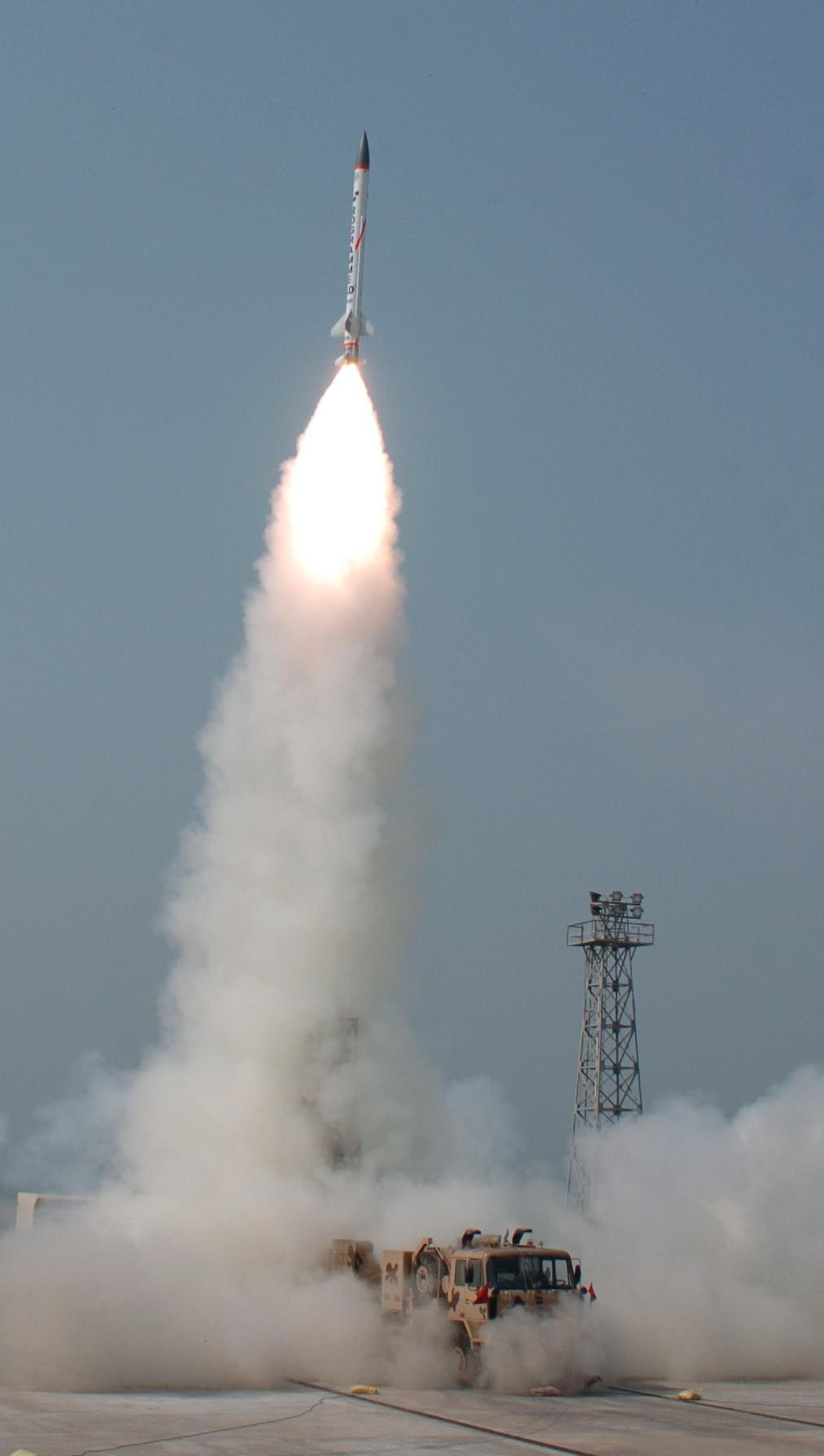
Launching of Advanced Air Defense (AAD) missile

The Indian Ballistic Missile Defence Program is an initiative to develop and deploy a multi-layered ballistic missile defense system to protect India from ballistic missile attacks.

India was a pioneer in South Asia to commence development of a defence dome system.The program was launched in year 1999 after Kargil war.

Introduced in light of the ballistic missile threat from Pakistan, it is a double-tiered system consisting of two interceptor missiles, namely the Prithvi Air Defence (PAD) missile for high-altitude interception, and the Advanced Air Defence (AAD) Missile for lower altitude interception. The missiles mentioned was developed as a part of Phase 1. The two-tiered shield should be able to intercept an incoming missile having a range of up to 2,000 kilometers.

PAD was tested in November 2006, followed by AAD in December 2007. With the test of the PAD missile, India became the fourth country to have successfully developed an Anti-ballistic missile system, after United States, Russia and Israel. On 6 March 2009, India again successfully tested its missile defense shield, during which a test "enemy" missile was intercepted at an altitude of 75 km.

On 6 May 2012, it was announced that Phase-I is complete and can be deployed to protect two Indian cities at a short notice. New Delhi, the national capital, and Mumbai, had been selected for the ballistic missile defence shield. After successful implementation in Delhi and Mumbai, the system will be used to cover other major cities in the country. This shield can destroy incoming ballistic missiles with range up to 2,000 km. When the Phase II is completed and PDV is developed, the two anti-ballistic missiles can intercept targets up to range 5,000 km both at exo- and endo-atmospheric (inside the atmosphere) regions.

Apart from DRDO's endeavour to develop a potent missile defense, India is reportedly examining the Israeli Arrow, the Almaz design bureau's S-300 PMU-1/-2 and S-400 and the Antey design bureau's Antey 2500/S-300VM. India has procured a squadron of S-300V systems which are in use as an 'anti-tactical ballistic missile screen'.

India also purchased S-400 system from Russia for US$5.4 billion in 2018.

=== Cruise missile defence ===
Defending against an attack by a cruise missile on the other hand is similar to tackling low-flying manned aircraft and hence most methods of aircraft defence can be used for a cruise missile defence system.

In order to ward off the threats of nuke-tipped cruise missile attack India has a new missile defence programme which will be focused solely on intercepting cruise missiles. The technological breakthrough has been created with an Advanced Air Defence missile (AAD). DRDO Chief, Dr V K Saraswat stated in an Interview "Our studies have indicated that this AAD will be able to handle a cruise missile intercept,"

Furthermore, India is acquiring airborne radars like AWACS to ensure detection of cruise missiles in order to stay on top of the threat.

Barak-8 is a long-range anti-air and anti-missile naval defence system which has been developed and tested successfully by Israel Aerospace Industries (IAI) and the Defence Research and Development Organisation (DRDO) of India. The Indian Army has inducted a variant of Barak 8 missile to meet its requirement for a medium-range surface-to-air air defence missile. The naval version of this missile has the capability to intercept incoming enemy cruise missiles and combat jets targeting its warships at sea. India has a joint venture for this missile with Israel.

On 17 November 2010, in an interview Rafael's Vice President Mr. Lova Drori confirmed that the David's Sling system has been offered to the Indian Armed Forces. But, as of July 2024, India does not have plans to acquire the system.

== Iran ==
After the Russian ban on exporting S-300 to Iran (which was lifted in 2015), Iran decided to develop a similar system domestically: "We have planned to build a long-range air defence missile system similar to S-300. By God's grace and by the Iranian engineers' efforts, we will reach self-sufficiency in this regard."

=== Khordad 15 ===
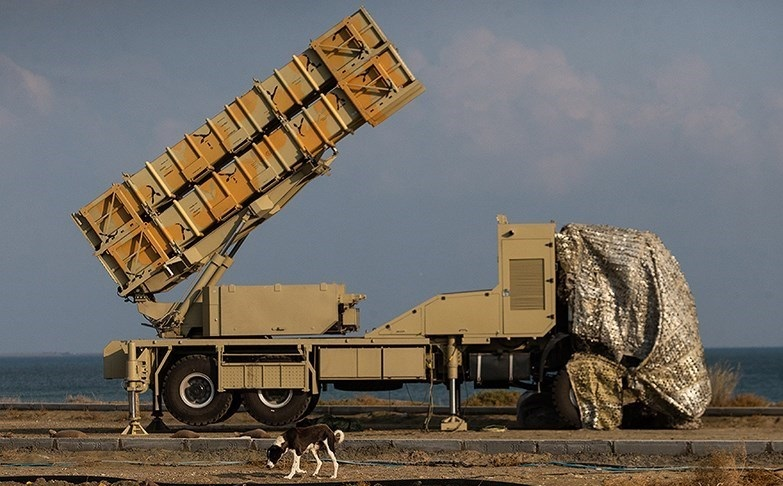
Iranian Khordad 15

The Khordad 15 is an Iranian designed and built surface-to-air missile (SAM) system. The system was unveiled to the public on 9 June 2019 in an address made by Iranian Defence Minister Amir Hatami in Tehran, Iran. The system was developed by the Iran Aviation Industries Organization (IAIO). It shall have the capability to detect and intercept fighter jets, stealth targets, unmanned combat aerial vehicles (UCAV) and cruise missiles. It operates in conjunction with Sayyad-3 missiles. The surface-to-air missile system was developed in order to counter missiles and other aerial threats presented by the presence of extra-regional forces at military bases in countries around Iran. It was unveiled amid escalating tensions with the United States and Europe's failing attempts at upholding its commitments to the 2015 Iran nuclear deal.

=== Bavar-373 ===
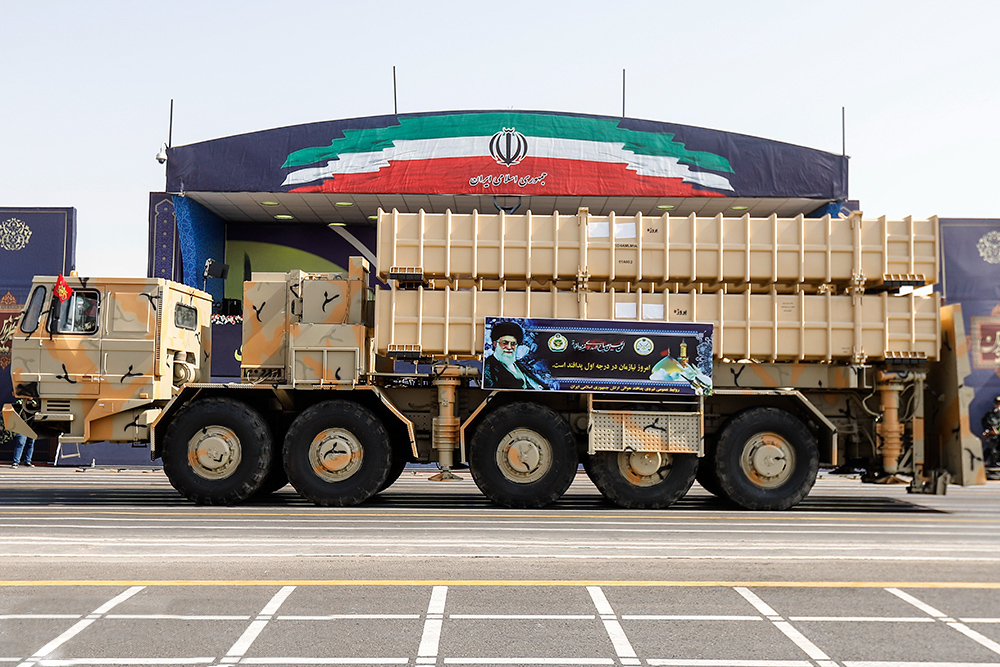
Bavar 373

Bavar-373 is an Iranian long-range road-mobile surface-to-air missile system unveiled in August 2016. Iran describes it as a competitor with the S-300 missile system. It is manufactured by the Iranian Defence Ministry in cooperation with unspecified local manufacturers and universities.

The system was formally unveiled during a ceremony attended on 22 August 2019, and was declared operational the same day.

An upgraded version was unveiled in 2022. Iran described it as a competitor with the S-400 and said it is capable of shooting down Fifth-generation fighter aircraft.

The first prototype was built on 22 November 2011. Iran announced that the system was designed and built by defense ministry, domestic industries and some Iranian universities. Esmaieli said that Iran doesn't even think about S-300 anymore as Bavar-373 was much more capable. Iranian sources suggest that the Bavar 373 will be mobile, with four missiles loaded on each mobile truck launcher.

=== Arman ===
The Arman missile system (full name: Arman long-range anti-ballistic missile system) is an anti-ballistic defense system built by the Iranian Ministry of Defense. There are two versions of the Iranian defense system, each equipped with different radars. One version utilizes a passive radar carrier, while the other model features an active radar. The Arman system employs Sayad-3F missiles.

== Israel ==
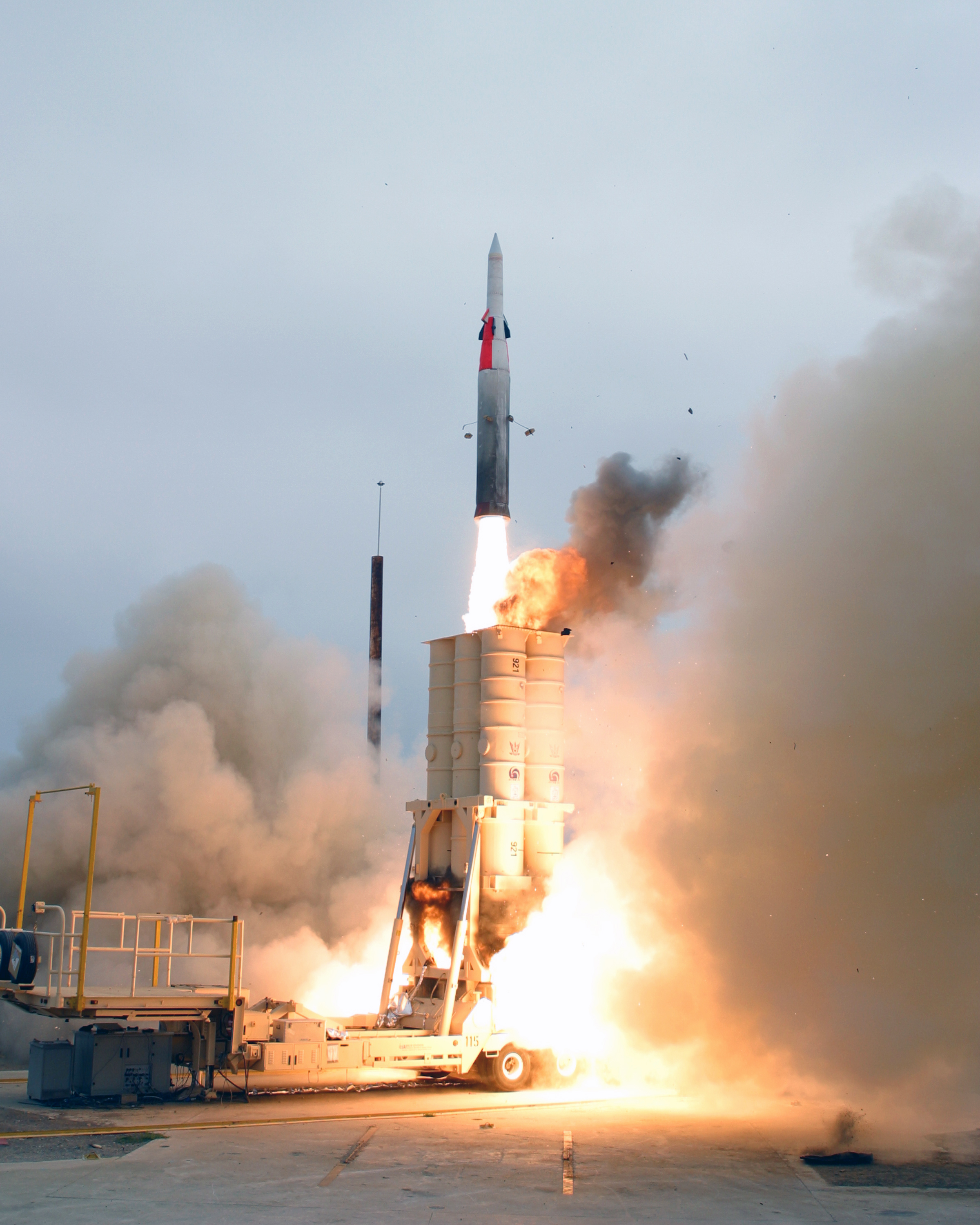
An Arrow anti-ballistic missile interceptor.

Israel has multiple missile defense systems, covering the wide range of missile threats.

=== Arrow ===
The Arrow or Hetz (Hebrew: חֵץ, pronounced [ˈχet͡s]) is an Israeli family of anti-ballistic missiles, partially funded by the US. (Note: Dr. Uzi Rubin: "The Arrow program used practically no U.S. technology, just U.S. money. It was almost entirely based on Israeli technology, though we bought some components in the U.S. because they were cheaper." (2003) —source) It was designed to fulfill an Israeli requirement for a theater missile defense system. Undertaken by Israel Aerospace Industries (IAI) and Boeing, it is overseen by the Israeli Ministry of Defense's "Homa" (Hebrew: חומה, pronounced [χoma], "rampart") administration and the U.S. Missile Defense Agency.

The Arrow system consists of the joint production hypersonic Arrow anti-missile interceptor, the Elta EL/M-2080 "Green Pine" early-warning AESA radar, the Tadiran Telecom "Golden Citron" ("Citron Tree") C^{3}I center, and the Israel Aerospace Industries "Brown Hazelnut" ("Hazelnut Tree") launch control center. The system is transportable, as it can be moved to other prepared sites.

Following the construction and testing of the Arrow 1 technology demonstrator, production and deployment began with the Arrow 2 version of the missile. The Arrow is considered one of the most advanced missile defense programs currently in existence.

It is the first operational missile defense system specifically designed and built to intercept and destroy ballistic missiles. The first Arrow battery was declared fully operational in October 2000. Although several of its components have been exported, the Israeli Air Defense Command within the Israeli Air Force (IAF) of the Israel Defense Forces (IDF) is currently the sole user of the complete Arrow system. Arrow 3 was declared operational on Wednesday, 18 January 2017. Development of the Arrow 3 began in 2008, and it was declared operational in January 2017. It flies at greater speeds, and has greater range and altitude compared to the Arrow 2, intercepting ballistic missiles during the space-flight portion of their trajectory. According to the chairman of the Israeli Space Agency, Arrow 3 may serve as an anti-satellite weapon, which would make Israel one of the world's few countries capable of shooting down satellites.

The design of Arrow 3 promises to be an extremely capable system, more advanced than what we have ever attempted in the U.S. with our programs. [...] This has to do with the seekers that have greater flexibility and other aspects, such as propulsion systems – it will be an extremely capable system.

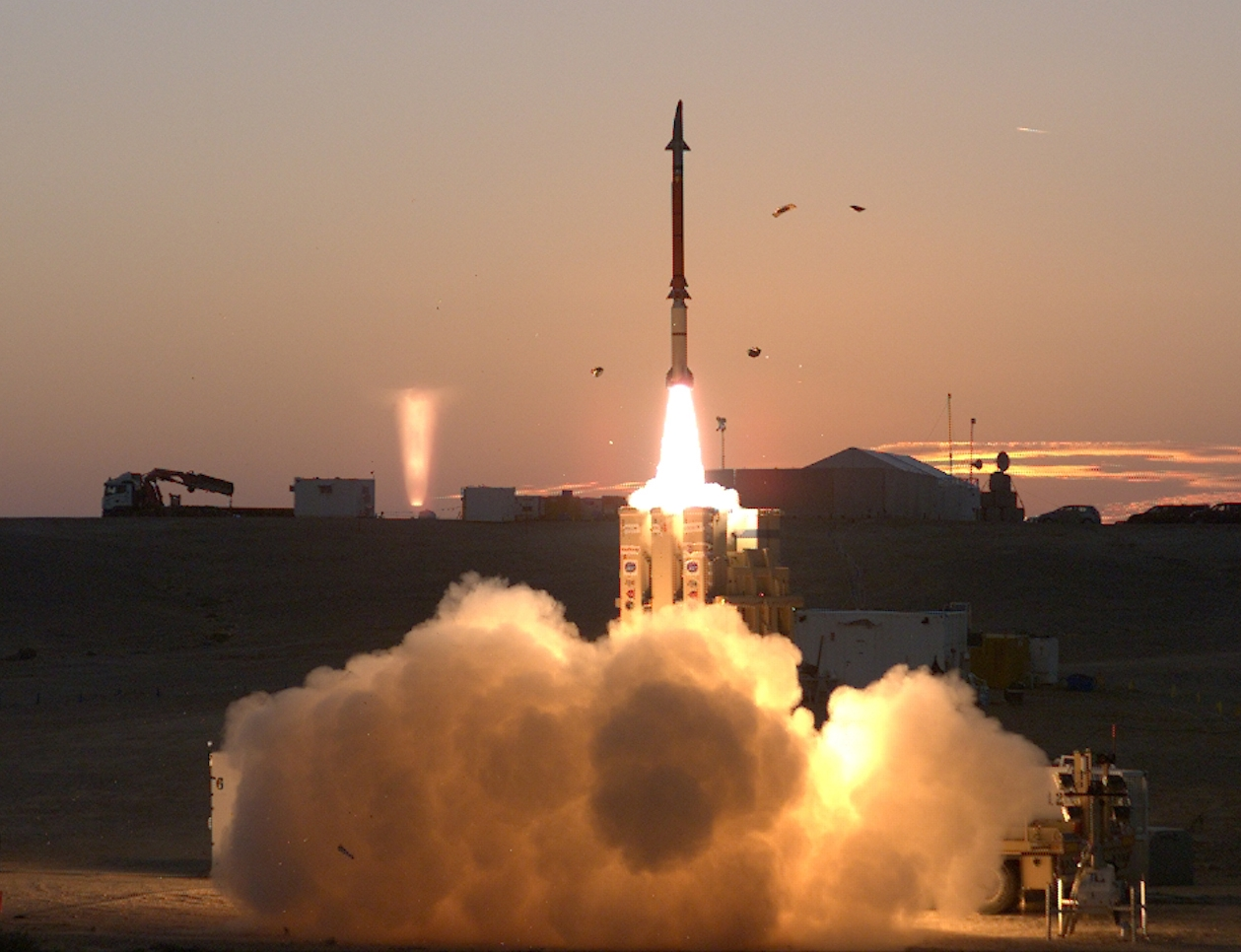
David's Sling Stunner missile launch during final test

=== David's Sling ===
David's Sling (Hebrew: קֶלַע דָוִד, romanized: Kela David) is an Israel Defense Forces military system that was jointly developed by the Israeli defense contractor Rafael Advanced Defense Systems and the American defense contractor Raytheon, designed to intercept enemy planes, drones, tactical ballistic missiles, medium- to long-range rockets and cruise missiles, fired at ranges from 40 km (24.85 miles) to 300 km (186.41 miles). Development began in 2009, and it was declared operational in April 2017 with the Israel Defense Forces.

=== Barak 8 ===
Barak 8 (Hebrew: בָּרָק, lit. "Lightning"), also known as LR-SAM or MR-SAM, is an Indo-Israeli jointly developed surface-to-air missile (SAM) system, designed to defend against any type of airborne threat including aircraft, helicopters, anti-ship missiles, and UAVs as well as ballistic missiles, cruise missiles and combat jets. Both maritime and land-based variants of the system exist. It was developed by IDF, Elta Systems, Rafael Advanced Defense Systems and India's Bharat Dynamics. Currently, it is deployed by Israel solely in the Israeli Navy, though land-based versions do exist and have been deployed by the Indian Army and the Indian Air Force.

=== Iron Dome ===
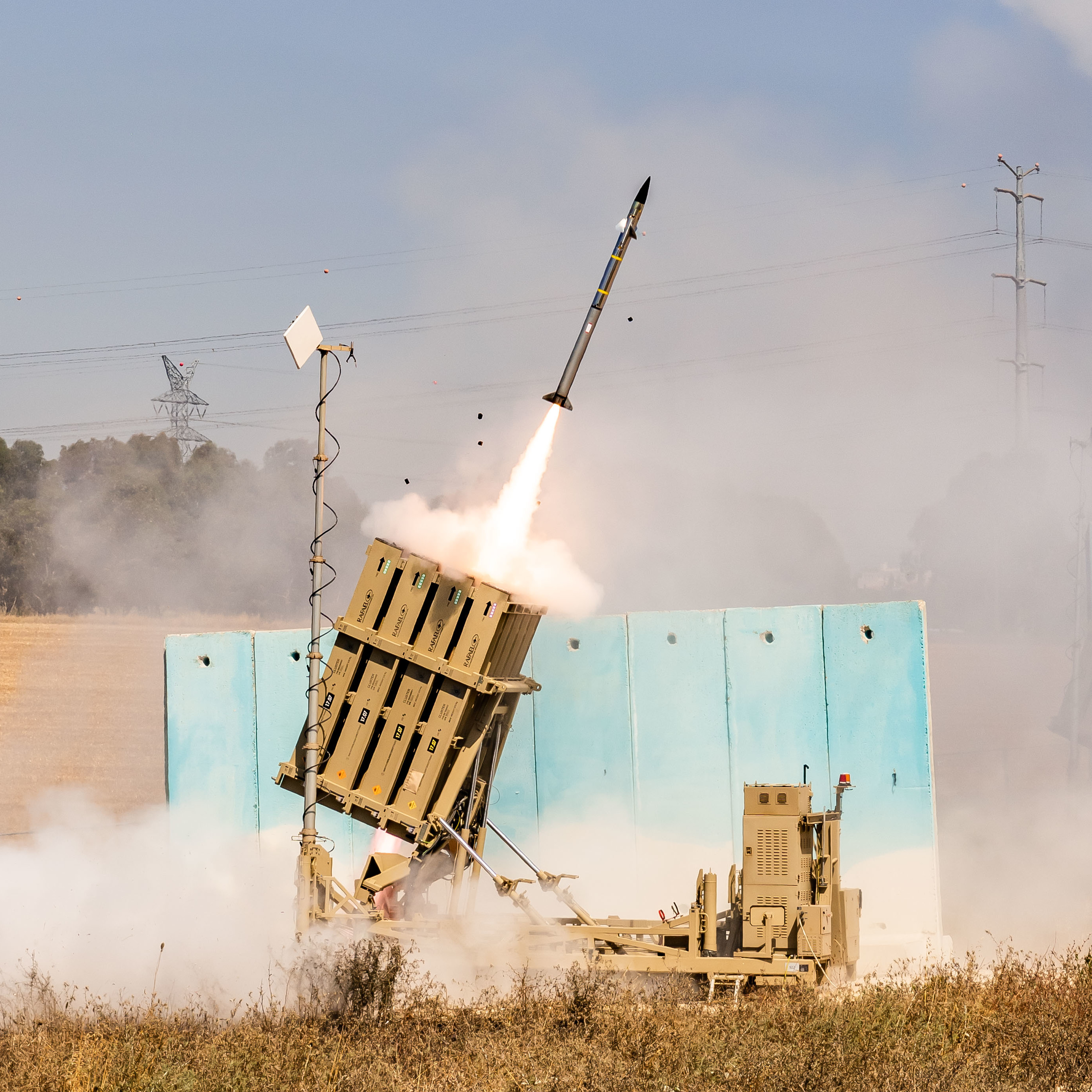
Iron Dome battery firing

Iron Dome (Hebrew: כִּפַּת בַּרְזֶל, romanized: Kippat Barzel) is a short-range artillery and rocket interception system jointly developed by the Israeli Rafael Advanced Defense Systems and Israel Aerospace Industries. Development began in 2005, and it was declared operational in March 2011. It intercepted its first rocket from Gaza in April of that year, and since then has had a success rate of over 90%.

=== Iron Beam ===
Iron Beam (Hebrew: קֶרֶן בַּרְזֶל, Keren Barzel), officially אור איתן (Magen Or, lit. "Light Shield"), is a directed-energy weapon air defense system which was unveiled at the Singapore Airshow on 11 February 2014 by Israeli defense contractor Rafael Advanced Defense Systems. The system is designed to destroy short-range rockets, artillery, and mortar bombs; it has a range of up to 7 km (4.3 mi), too close for the Iron Dome system to intercept projectiles effectively. In addition, the system could also intercept unmanned aerial vehicles (UAVs). The system is projected to cost under $3 US per interception, and become operational by October 2025.

== Japan ==
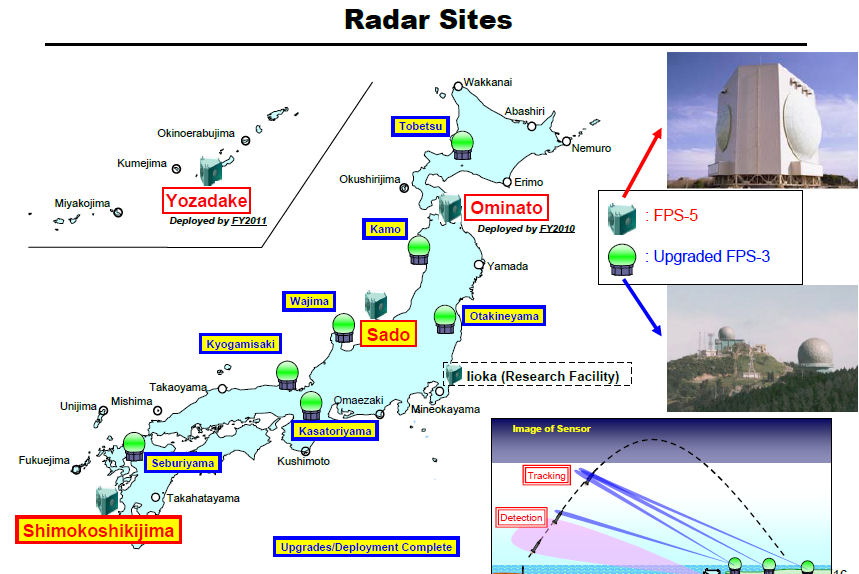
J/FPS-3 and J/FPS-5 distribution as of 2012

Since 1998, when North Korea launched a Taepodong-1 missile over northern Japan, the Japanese have been jointly developing a new surface-to-air interceptor known as the Patriot Advanced Capability 3 (PAC-3) with the US. So far tests have been successful, and there are planned 11 locations that the PAC-3 will be installed. A military spokesman said that tests had been done on two sites, one of them a business park in central Tokyo, and Ichigaya – a site not far from the Imperial Palace. Along with the PAC-3, Japan has installed the US-developed Aegis ship-based anti-ballistic missile system, which was tested successfully on 18 December 2007. The missile was launched from a Japanese warship, in partnership with the US Missile Defense Agency and destroyed a mock target launched from the coast.

In the 2010s, Japan consulted with the United States to possibly deploy the Terminal High Altitude Area Defense (THAAD) system and a ground-based version of the Standard Missile-3 interceptors mounted on Aegis destroyers. In a joint US-Japan test of Standard Missile-3 Block IIa, a medium-range ballistic missile was successfully intercepted on 3 February 2017. Japan's intention is to create a four-stage anti-missile shield. In 2020, Japan scrapped plans to buy the land-based Aegis Ashore system from the US, stating the system would be too costly and time-consuming.

The J/FPS-5 radar system was adopted by Japan in the 2000s in response to growing North Korean capabilities.

A U.S. plan to increase PAC-3 Patriot missile production in Japan is delayed due to a critical seeker component shortage from Boeing. Japan's Mitsubishi Heavy Industries can double its PAC-3 output to 60 per year, but expansion hinges on additional seeker supplies, highlighting supply chain challenges.

== Pakistan ==
Pakistan maintains a multi-layered missile and air defence architecture, largely procured from China and supplemented by indigenous systems:

- Long‑range / High‑to‑Medium SAMs: Pakistan inducted the HQ‑9 P (HIMADS) in October 2021, covering approximately 125 km, followed by newer variants HQ‑9BE (up to ~260 km) and export variant FD‑2000, forming the backbone of high-altitude defence. These systems leverage HT‑233 and JSG‑400 phased-array radars and can track multiple targets simultaneously.
- Medium-range SAMs: The LY‑80 / HQ‑16FE family provides a mid-tier layer with ranges between 40 and 160 km and altitudes up to ~27 km, utilizing semi‑active/adsa technology.
- Short-range & MANPADS: Coverage against low-flying threats is delivered via the FM‑90 (HQ‑7 variant) and assorted MANPADS including FN‑6, FN‑16, and indigenous Anza Mk II/Mk III.
- Indigenous radar: Deployment of the SR‑3D S‑band AESA radar since early 2024 enhances local target detection and tracking capability up to ~80 km for both short‑ and mid‑range systems.
- Emerging high-altitude / exo‑atmospheric layer: Pakistan is reportedly in advanced negotiations for the Chinese HQ‑19 ABM system (comparable to U.S. THAAD), offering exo-atmospheric interception capability with an estimated range of 1,000–3,000 km and high-altitude engagement up to ~150 km.
- AM‑350S (under development by NRTC and Blue Surge): an S‑band, truck-mounted AESA 3D air‑surveillance radar unveiled at IDEAS 2024, with a detection range of ~350 km (engaging fighter-sized targets) and altitude coverage up to 60,000 ft. It features GaN TRMs, digital beamforming, full 360° azimuth, rapid 6 rpm refresh, and strong anti-jamming capabilities. It can be deployed within ~30 minutes

Together, these components form a Comprehensive Layered Integrated Air Defence (CLIAD) structure designed to counter a broad spectrum of aerial threats—from low-altitude cruise missiles and UAVs to long-range ballistic missiles.

== Russia ==
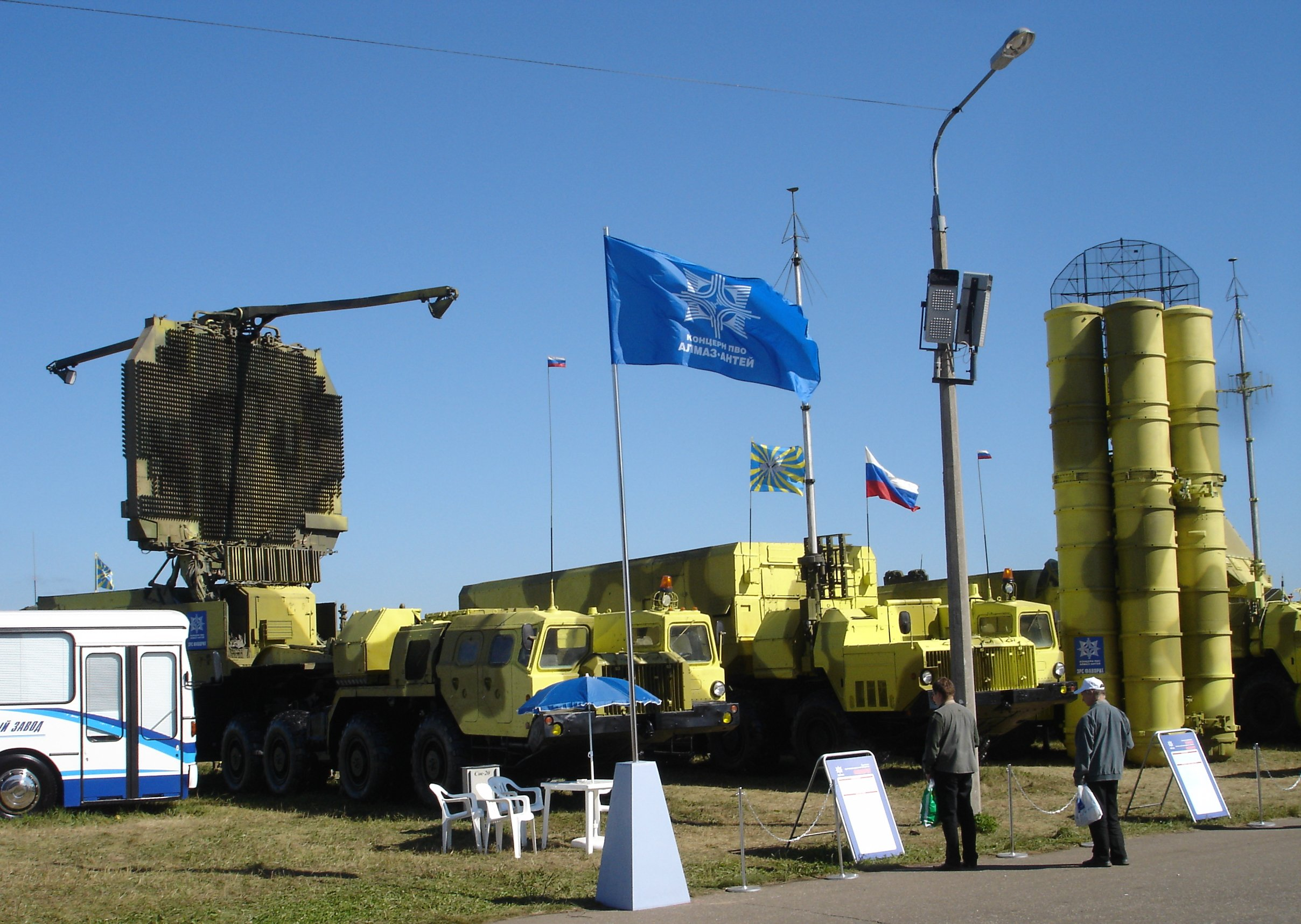
S-300PMU-2 vehicles. From left to right: 64N6E2 detection radar, 54K6E2 command post and 5P85 TEL.

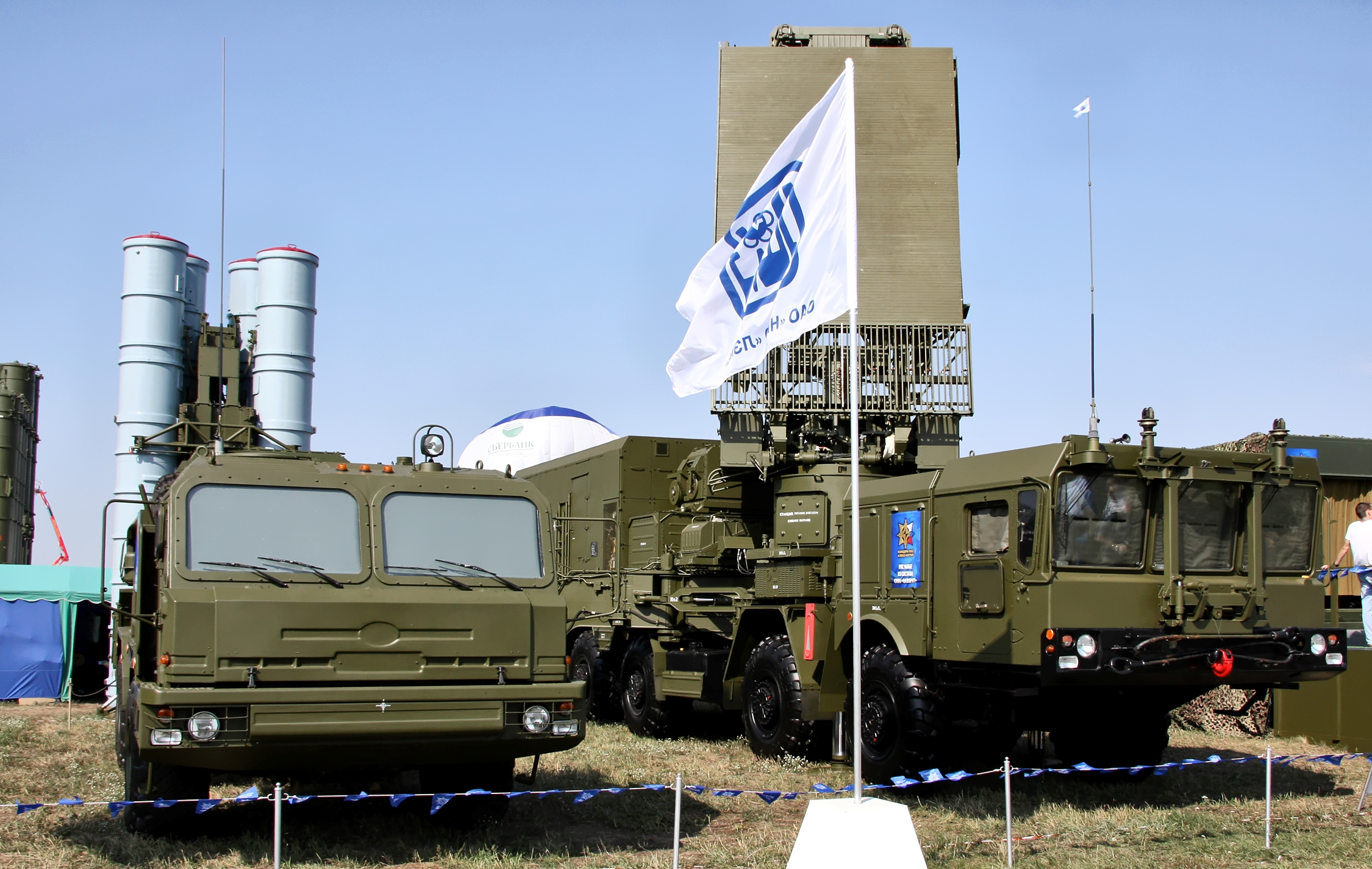
S-400 vehicles. From left to right: 6P80 TEL, 65N6 detection radar.

The Russian A-135 anti-ballistic missile system is currently operational only around the city of Moscow, the national capital, and is being augmented to protect major cities in Russia. The A-135 anti-ballistic missile system is a Russian military complex deployed around Moscow to counter enemy missiles targeting the city or its surrounding areas. It became operational during 1995. It is a successor to the previous A-35, and compliant with the 1972 Anti-Ballistic Missile Treaty from which the US unilaterally withdrew in 2002.

The A-135 system attained "alert" (operational) status on 17 February 1995. It is currently operational although its 53T6 (NATO:SH-11) component is deactivated (as of February 2007). A newer missile is expected to replace it. There is an operational test version of the system at the test site in Sary Shagan, Kazakhstan.

The S-300PMU1 and PMU2 can intercept SRBMs, and the S-300V and S-400 Triumf systems are capable of intercepting a multiple IRBM attack by all DF-21 model IRBMs. These air-defense systems have been purchased by Turkey, India, China, Saudi Arabia, and South Korea. Other countries which have also expressed interest include Iran and Belarus.

The enhanced S-300VM/VMK is capable of intercepting ballistic missiles with a range of 2,500 km re-entry speeds of 4.5 km/s, whereas the S-400 is claimed to be capable of intercepting ballistic missiles with a range of 3,500 km which equates to re-entry speeds of 4.8 to 5 km/s. A system designed to intercept warheads at 5 km/s has the ability to act as a point system against simple ICBM warheads which have a typical re-entry speed of 7 km/s. Apart from the main Moscow deployment, Russia has striven actively for intrinsic ABM capabilities of its late model SAM systems. Russian ground based theatre defence against ballistic and cruise missiles are centered on the in-service

- S-300P (SA-10)
- S-300V (SA-12A/B Giant/Gladiator)
- S-300PMU-1/2 (SA-20A/B Gargoyle)
- S-400 (SA-21)
- S-500 (In development)

== South Korea ==
Like the UAE (see below), South Korea has agreed to deploy THAAD systems. The agreement was announced in July 2016.

A kinetic-kill defense such as THAAD destroys high-value incoming missiles by colliding with them. The agreement came after a North Korean intermediate-range ballistic missile launch in June 2016; China has rebuked the actions of the involved parties, as destabilizing. South Korean military sources responded that a 12 February 2017 launch by North Korea represented a new technology, a 'cold launch' using compressed gas before the solid-fuel rocket ignition. This type of launch is a submarine-launched ballistic missile (SLBM) technology. China responded to the North Korean launch by cutting off their import of North Korean coal, which is 50% of North Korea's income. On 6 March 2017, North Korea launched four missiles from Tongchang-ri, a known long-range missile site at 7:36 a.m. local time, one of which landed in the Sea of Japan (East Sea of Korea), with the remaining three missiles landing in Japan's economic zone. A fifth North Korean missile failed to launch.

That day, the first vehicles of a THAAD battery deployed to South Korea. Two launcher trucks arrived at Osan Air Base, South Korea, on 6 March 2017. By 6 September 2017 the AN/TPY-2 radar, the fire control system, and all six launchers (with 48 THAAD interceptors) were fully deployed.

South Korea is also developing several indigenous short-range BMD systems, under its Korean Air and Missile Defense (KAMD) system scheduled to be deployed by the early 2020s. KAMD is a multi-platform, short-range air and missile defense concept that South Korea has been developing since 2006 to enhance its protection against DPRK SRBMs, cruise missiles, and light aircraft. South Korea is developed the Cheongung Korean medium-range surface-to-air missile (KM-SAM), intended to intercept DPRK SRBMs and MRBMs at a relatively low altitude, similar to PAC-3. The Korean long-range surface-to-air missile (L-SAM), under development until 2023, will reportedly be similar to THAAD, operating in a high-altitude, terminal-phase intercept role against SRBMs and MRBMs.

== Taiwan ==
Taiwan operates the Sky Bow family of BMD systems. Development of Sky Bow I began in 1981 with deployment beginning in 1993. The Sky Bow II is an improved version of the Sky Bow I. Both the Sky Bow I and Sky Bow II use a common silo launch system.

In 2001 development of the completely new Sky Bow III system began with flight testing commencing in 2009 and deployment soon after. The Sky Bow III has a top speed of Mach 7. A naval variant of the Sky Bow III has also been developed.

In addition to the BMD force the Army operates the Antelope air defence system which has a significant anti-cruise missile capability. The ROCAF also operates imported Patriot PAC-3 batteries.

== Turkey ==
Turkey is developing and operating multiple missile defense system families. These initiatives gained further momentum after the tensions with the United States over the acquisition of S-400's, and further disputes regarding the F-35 deal between the two country. In response, Turkey accelerated its efforts to strengthen domestic defense capabilities and reduce dependence on foreign technology.

The first noteworthy effort began in 2007 with the Hisar program, followed by more advanced SİPER project in 2018 and the launch of the SUNGUR in 2022, with the collaboration of multiple Turkish defense companies including Aselsan and Roketsan. All mainly aimed at achieving greater economic and strategic autonomy over the East Mediterranean and Black Sea regions.

In 2024, Turkey announced its own integrated defense network called Steel Dome, which combines missile defense systems, anti-aircraft weaponry, incorporating a mix of conventional arms, laser technology, and electronic warfare capabilities.

== United Arab Emirates ==
United Arab Emirates (UAE) has graduated its first two American Terminal High Altitude Air Defense (THAAD) unit classes at Fort Bliss in 2015, and in 2016. Its first live-fire exercises with missiles took place in 2014. The UAE is "the first GCC (Gulf Cooperation Council) partner to possess an upper tier ballistic missile defense capability the THAAD weapon system," stated the US Army general who addressed this graduating class.

== United States ==
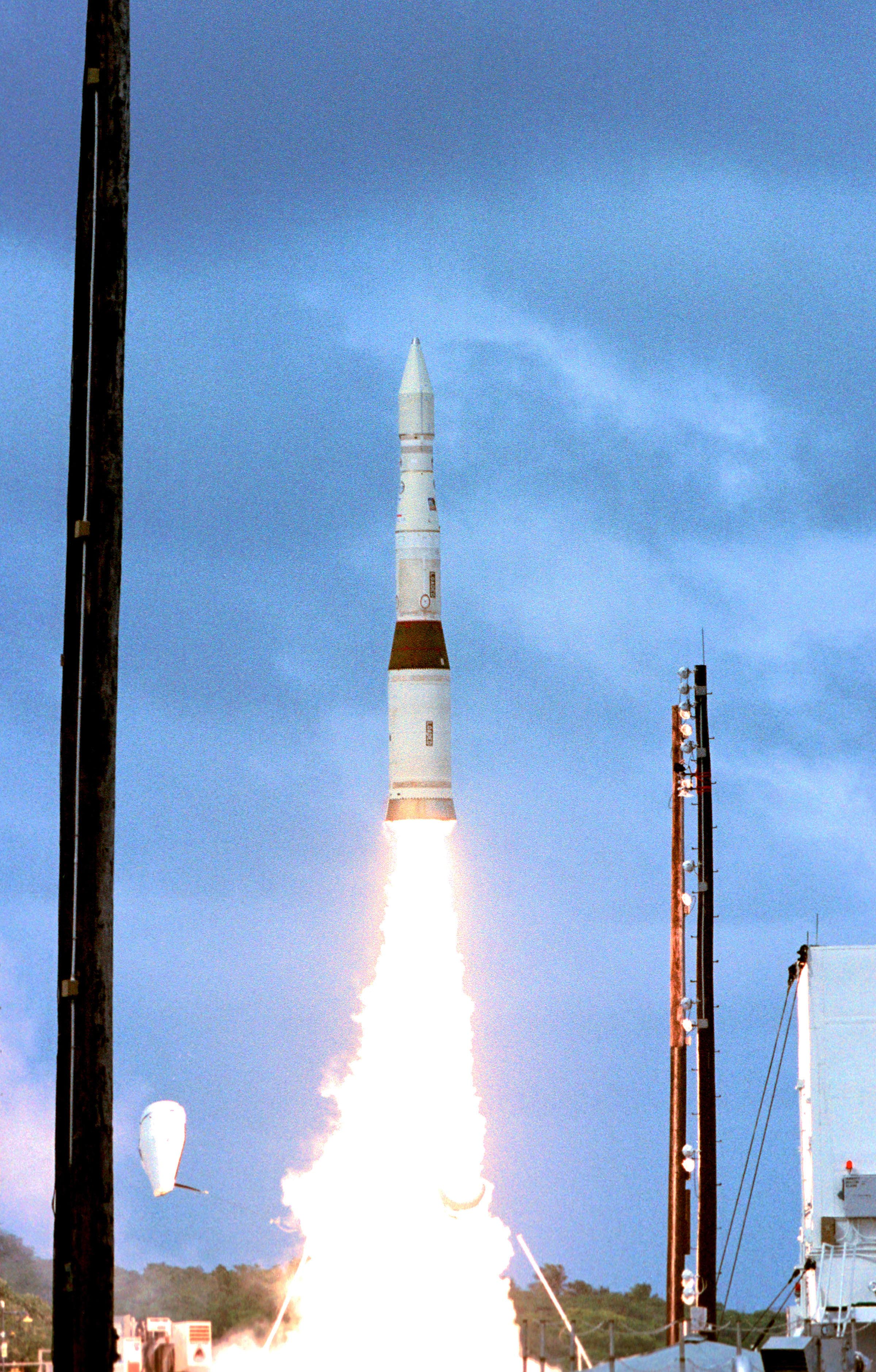
A Payload Launch Vehicle (PLV) carrying a prototype exo-atmospheric kill vehicle is launched from Meck Island at the Kwajalein Missile Range on 3 December 2001, for an intercept of a ballistic missile target over the central Pacific Ocean.

The U.S. Sentinel program was a planned national missile defense during the 1970s, but was never deployed. Elements of Sentinel were actually deployed briefly as the Safeguard Program, although it was not national in scope. United States has had in development a nationwide antimissile program since the 1990s. After the renaming in 2002, the term now refers to the entire program, not just the ground-based interceptors and associated facilities.

Other elements yet to be integrated into National Missile Defense (NMD) may include anti-ballistic missiles, or sea-based, space-based, laser, and high-altitude missile systems. The NMD program is limited in scope and designed to counter a relatively small ICBM attack from a less sophisticated adversary. Unlike the earlier Strategic Defense Initiative program, it is not designed to be a robust shield against a large attack from a technically sophisticated adversary.

As of 2012, this system is operational with limited capability. In early April 2013, the Pentagon announced plans to deploy 14 more Ground-Based Interceptor (GBI) missiles to Alaska in response to the North Korean threats to deliver nuclear weapons to the United States. A Terminal High Altitude Area Defense (THAAD) battery was deployed to Guam as well.

== Criticism ==
Bruno Gruselle, in 2010, noted that French policymakers considered the 1972 Anti-Ballistic Missile (ABM) Treaty and the doctrine of mutual assured destruction to be the cornerstones of strategic stability. Some French analysts, notably Camille Grand, view missile defense as jeopardizing both the doctrine and the treaty, as well as risking a new arms race, which is reflected in the development of advanced missile defense counter measures and decoys as well as a higher number of and more maneuverable independently targetable reentry vehicles—as well as the intercept systems designed to defeat them.

Additionally, experts such as L. David Montague, retired U.S. Air Force General Eugene E. Habiger and Harvey L. Lynch question the reliability of these systems. Beyond the technical difficulties, which have been described as more challenging than hitting one bullet with another, all performance data is derived from experiments and scripted tests. Their effectiveness in an actual all-out war situation is uncertain. However, non-nuclear ballistic and conventional missiles have been used in recent limited regional conflicts to strategic effect. Several Houthi-fired ballistic missiles in Yemen have been intercepted by Saudi MIM-104 Patriot batteries, and Russian cruise missiles have been notably used in the Syrian Civil War.

Gruselle noted most French security experts doubted the technological feasibility of intercontinental ballistic missile defense. Some thought it foolish to spend huge amounts of money on unproven technologies that lacked operational or political usefulness. Instead, the French defense policy community viewed missile defense merely as an American "economic weapon" used to defeat the Soviet Union and win the Cold War.

The extant missile defenses of the 2010s are vulnerable to maneuverable hypersonic vehicles, which can maneuver at speeds high enough to defeat missile defenses. As of 2010, China was among the countries pursuing hypersonic vehicles as warhead delivery systems.

In 2010, Yousaf Butt, a critic of missile defense, stated in The Bulletin of the Atomic Scientists that "just as with nuclear weapons, the U.S. infatuation with missile defense will cause other nations to desire this expensive technology".

In 2012, Russia's top military officer threatened to carry out a pre-emptive strike on U.S.-led NATO missile defense facilities in Eastern Europe if Washington goes ahead with its plan to build a missile shield. Russian Defense Minister Anatoliy Serdyukov also warned that talks between Moscow and Washington on the topic are "close to a dead end." U.S. State Department special envoy Ellen Tauscher responded that neither country could afford another arms race.

== See also ==
- Anti-ballistic missile
- Anti-submarine missile
- Ballistic missile
- Aegis Ballistic Missile Defense System
- Comparison of anti-ballistic missile systems
- Nuclear strategy
- Missile Defense Agency
