= Future Multi Purpose Trimaran concept =

Proposed Japanese naval vessel

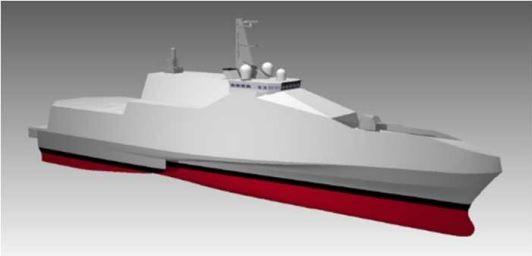
- HSMVO design concept

Class overview
- Name: Future Multi Purpose Trimaran concept
- Builders: Acquisition, Technology & Logistics Agency (Designers)
- Operators: Japan Maritime Self-Defense Force (Potentially)

General characteristics
- Type: Littoral combat ship
- Displacement: 1,500 tons
- Length: 92.0 m (301 ft 10 in)
- Beam: 21.0 m (68 ft 11 in)
- Draft: 4.0 m (13 ft 1 in)
- Propulsion: 3 × diesel engines; 3 × water jets
- Speed: 35+ knots
- Range: 3500 nautical miles at 15 knots
- Boats & landing craft carried: (HADR configuration); - 2 x RHIBs; (Offshore patrol/special ops configuration); - 8 x 7.0 m (23 ft 0 in) RHIBs; - 2 x 11.0 m (36 ft 1 in) RHIBs
- Complement: 50
- Electronic warfare & decoys: 4 x Mark 36 SRBOC
- Armament: 1 × OTO Melara 76 mm naval gun; 1 × Phalanx CIWS; 2 × Remote weapon station; (MCM configuration); - 16 × 4.0 m (13 ft 1 in) MCM UUVs; - 2 × 11.0 m (36 ft 1 in) MCM USVs
- Aircraft carried: 1 × AgustaWestland AW101 for all mission configurations; (MCM configuration); - 1 × VTOL UAV; (Offshore patrol/special ops configuration); - 1 × ISR UAV

The Future Multi Purpose Trimaran concept (also known as HSMVO (High Speed Multi-hull Vessel Optimization) trimaran vessel concept) is a concept design of a future naval ship for the Japan Maritime Self-Defense Force.

== Development ==
The Japanese Ministry of Defense held in interest in the trimaran design and conducted research on it as far back as 2011.

On March 4, 2014, it was announced that Japan and US will jointly research on a LCS-style warship under the Mutual Defense Assistance Act. The joint research is conducted by the Acquisition, Technology & Logistics Agency (ATLA) and the Naval Surface Warfare Center Carderock Division of the US Navy.

In 2017, ATLA unveiled the trimaran warship concept model in a Japanese defense trade-show called MAST Asia 2017. According to Navy Recognition, the project is set to end in 2018 and the JMSDF would ultimately decide whether to adopt the concept for development or not.

== Design ==
The HSMVO design concept is based on the Independence-class littoral combat ship (LCS). As such it adopts the distinctive trimaran hull design and modular mission capabilities. Much like the Independence class, the HSMVO will be constructed out of aluminum. However, there are some differences between the HSMVO and Independence-class due to the Japanese requirements of the ship. The concept is stated to measure 92 meters in length, 21 meters in width, 4 meters in draft and displace 1,500 tons, making it smaller than both the Independence-class and Freedom-class littoral combat ships. It also has a maximum speed of over 35 knots and a range of 3500 nautical miles at 15 knots, making it slower and possessing a smaller range than either littoral combat ships. The HSMVO lacks anti-submarine warfare (ASW) and surface warfare (SuW) capabilities found on the LCS but is capable of performing humanitarian aid and disaster relief (HADR), which the LCS is not designed to do.

== Equipment ==
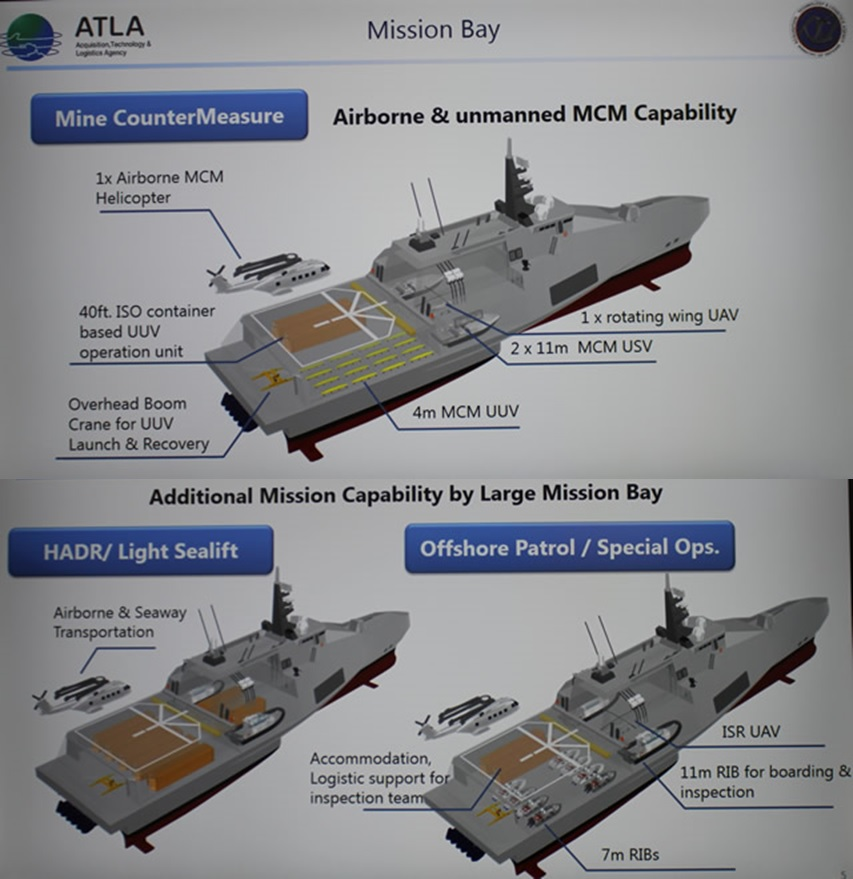
Mission configurations

The concept possesses an OTO Melara 76 mm naval gun, one Phalanx CIWS above the helicopter hangar, two remote controlled weapon station slightly behind the bridge, four Mark 36 SRBOC behind the mast, one AgustaWestland AW101 for mine countermeasure or transportation, an overhead boom crane to launch and recover UUVs (located at the stern), three active ride control systems that significantly reduce pitch and roll motions (located at the main hull), and a multi-mission bay of an area of over 730 square meters. It is propelled by three diesel engines and three water jets.

The mission capabilities of the concept includes mine countermeasure (MCM), HADR, and offshore patrol/special ops. Likewise, each configuration will consist of different weapons, equipment, and supplies.

Mine countermeasure configuration consists of the following:

- 16× 4 meter MCM UUVs
- 2× 40 feet containers for the UUVs and their control units
- 2× 11 meter MCM USVs
- 1× VTOL UAV
- 1× airborne MCM helicopter

HADR configuration consists of the following:

- 7× 40 feet containers for supplies
- 2× RHIBs
- 1x transport helicopter

Offshore patrol/special ops configuration consists of the following:

- 2× containers for logistic support for inspection team
- 8× 7 meter RHIBs
- 2× 11 meter RHIBs for VBSS
- 1× ISR UAV
- 1× transport helicopter

== See also ==
- Next-Generation Offshore Patrol Vessel program
