= Defense industry of Japan =

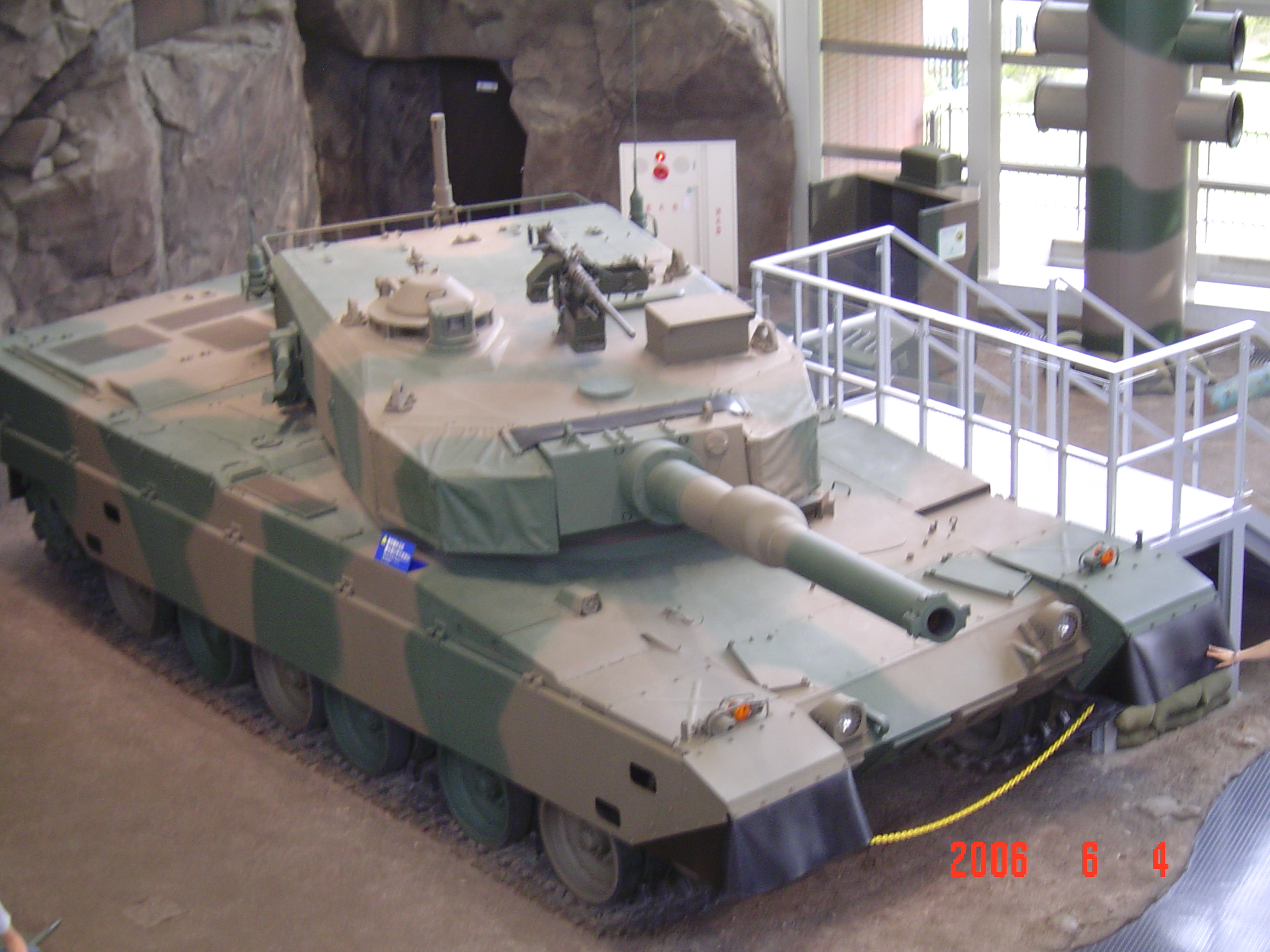
Type 90 Tank

The Japanese defense industry is the part of the Japanese economy responsible for the procurement of military technology, primarily for the nation's own Self-Defense Forces, largely due to a strict policy on national exports.

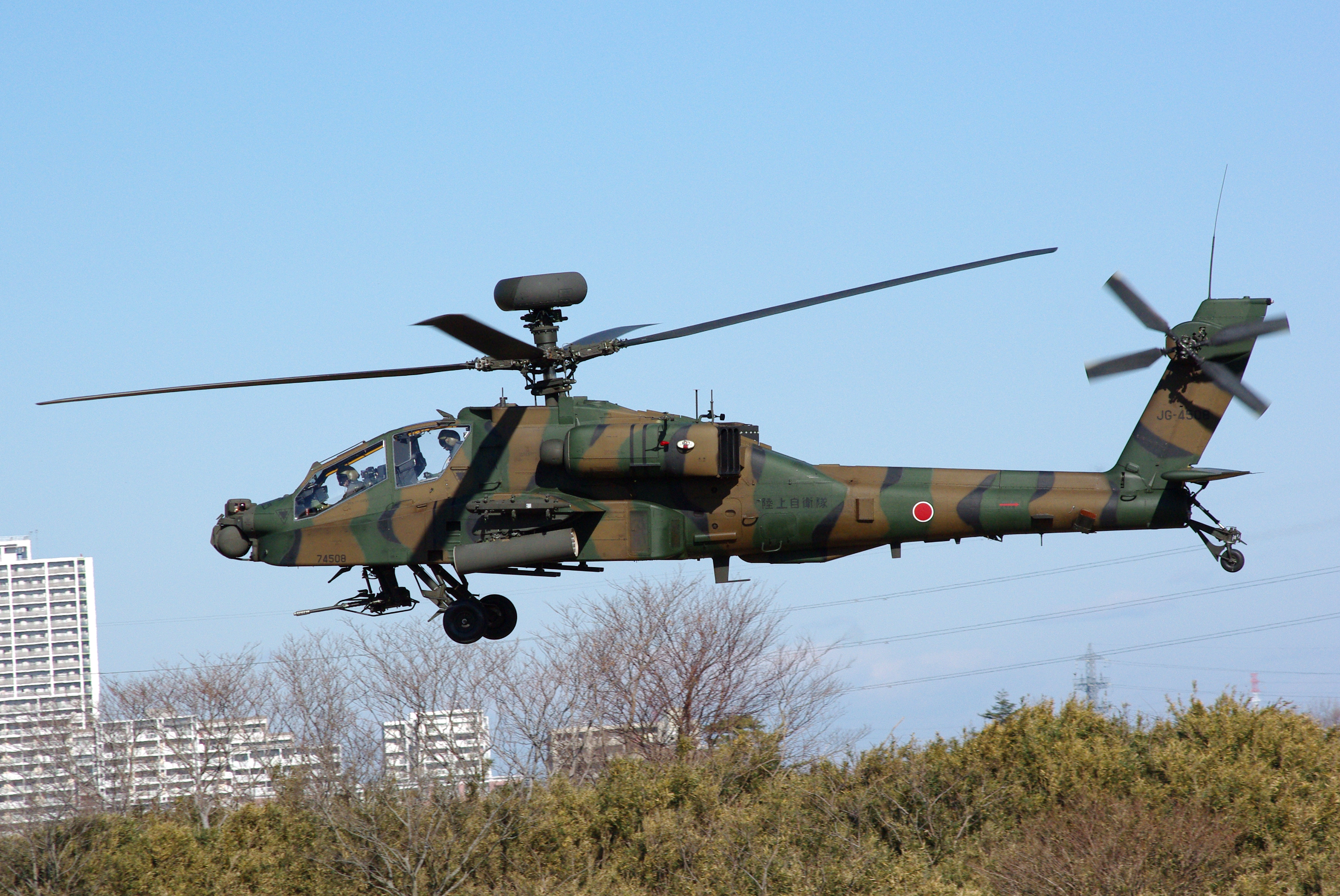
JGSDF AH-64D (DJP) attached to the 1st Airborne Brigade January 2012

== Postwar history ==
Following Allied occupation of Japan after the Second World War, major economic, social and governmental reforms were implemented to change and rebuild Japan. Among these changes included the creation of Article 9 of the Japanese Constitution, dismantlement of Japan's military, and abolishing military production and zaibatsu in an effort to demilitarize Japan. However, with the outbreak of the Korean War, U.S. troops garrisoned in Japan had to move to the Korean Peninsula for war: depriving Japan of its defenses. With this dilemma U.S. occupation authorities encouraged (or pressured) Japan into rebuilding its own military force: leading to the establishment of the National Police Reserve and later the Japan Self-Defense Forces. Around 1952, Japanese manufacturers began repairing and maintaining equipment for U.S. forces in Asia, and later in 1954, Japan's defense industry began to manufacture and arm the newly established JSDF with U.S. designed weapons. Former zaibatsus, such as Mitsubishi and Sumitomo, made their return to the defense industry. Furthermore, the 1954 Mutual Security Assistance Pact allowed Japan to receive military aid in the form of funds, materials, and services from the United States. The agreement further served as the basis for Japan to purchase and/or develop U.S. weapons under license as per the Treaty of Mutual Cooperation and Security Between the United States and Japan.

Following accusations that Japan was supplying napalm for U.S. forces during the Vietnam War, the Three Arms Exports Ban was implemented in 1967 to prevent arms export to countries who fit any of the three criteria: countries in the Eastern Bloc, countries under an arms embargo by the United Nations Security Council, or countries that are currently involved in, or likely to be involved in an international conflict.

In July 1970, then-Defense Agency director general Nakasone Yasuhiro established five objectives for the defense industry:

1. to maintain Japan's industrial base for national security
2. to acquire equipment from Japan's domestic research and development and production efforts
3. to use civilian industries for domestic arms production
4. to set long-term goals for research and development and production
5. to introduce competition into defense production

By the late 1970s, indigenous suppliers had developed and produced aircraft, tanks, artillery, and major surface and underwater naval combatants for the JSDF. Highly sophisticated weaponry, such as the F-15J, P-3C Orion, and 8-inch howitzers were produced under license. Few of these were directly purchased from foreign defense contractors except for very complex and costly items: such as the E-2C Hawkeye.

In 1976, the Three Arms Exports Ban turned into a complete total ban of Japanese arms export, with the exception of joint-development with the United States.

In the late 1980s, the defense industry, limited by the lack of research and development, inadequate testing equipment, restricted exports, and no economies of scale, accounted for only 0.5% of Japan's total industrial output. The Defense Production Committee of the Federation of Economic Organizations (Keizai Dantai Rengokai--Keidanren) was instrumental in defense production; negotiating with the Defense Agency and coordinating activities among defense firms, disseminated defense information and informally limiting competition by promoting agreements between companies. Nearly 60% of Japanese defense contracts were awarded to five large corporations: Mitsubishi Heavy Industries, Toshiba Corporation, Mitsubishi Electric Corporation, Kawasaki Heavy Industries, and Ishikawajima-Harima Heavy Industries Corporation. The mid to late 1980s saw an increase in indigenous production and joint development with the U.S. as larger portions of the defense budget were allotted to procurement. There have been calls for the relaxation of the arms-export ban. In 1988, a secret memorandum circulated among defense contractors estimated that lifting the export ban would result in Japan capturing 45% of the world's tank and self-propelled artillery market, 40% of military electronic sales, and 60% of naval ship construction. The arms-export ban was never lifted and by the post-Cold War era Japan's defense industry began to stagnate due to a combination of decreasing military budget, arms-export ban and increasing research and development cost while maintaining a static R&D budget.

The defense industry began to revitalize when Prime Minister Shinzō Abe took office a second time in 2012. Abe's defense policy called for an increase in military capabilities for Japan to better defend itself and its American ally in the face of growing Chinese influence and military buildup. To this end, the military budget began to increase from 2013 and onward, while reforms were implemented to coincide with Abe's defense policy. Two of the most important reforms for the defense industry included the lifting of the self imposed arms-export ban in 2014 and the establishment of the Acquisition, Technology & Logistics Agency (ATLA) in 2015. On 10 December 2025, Japan's Cabinet approved a record defense budget of approximately $58 billion (¥9.04 trillion) for fiscal year 2026, marking the fourteenth consecutive year of record defense spending and reflecting Japan's trajectory toward allocating 2% of GDP to defense by 2027.

== Challenges and potentials ==
Although Japan's defense industry produces the majority of Japan's military technology and is recognized for its quality, the defense industry has historically faced head winds that prevented it from obtaining substantial growth. These headwinds include high production cost, low unit production, small domestic market, export ban, limited R&D budget and general pacifist views in Japan.

=== Production ===
Despite producing and supplying arms to one of the most powerful and expensive military forces, Japan's defense industry remains to be a small sector in the nation's overall manufacturing output. Due to the small economy of scale within the defense industry, local manufacturers that produce arms for Japan do not prioritize arms production heavily for revenue. Japan's top manufacturers rely on less than 10% of their revenue from defense contracts. The small profit return and small development in engineering skill contributes to a lack of growth; which leads to expensive production, an increased dependency on foreign defense contractors and/or companies pulling out of the defense sector; which in turn hurts the defense industry even more. To offset some of the problems, in 2013 Japan began to participate in international technology cooperation with other countries beyond the United States, such as the United Kingdom and Australia. Japan's re-entry into the international arms market would allow Japanese manufacturers to establish more customers to further increase revenue and lower unit cost. The establishment of ATLA further benefits the defense industry by enhancing the efficiency of R&D, project management and procurement of military technology. One other potential for the Japanese defense industry's growth is through the usage of dual-use technology. Japan possesses a vast array of advanced civilian technologies that have military application. Through ATLA, the Ministry of Defense (MOD) has actively sought research collaborations with various research institutes, universities and companies to utilize advance civilian technology.

==== FS-X program ====
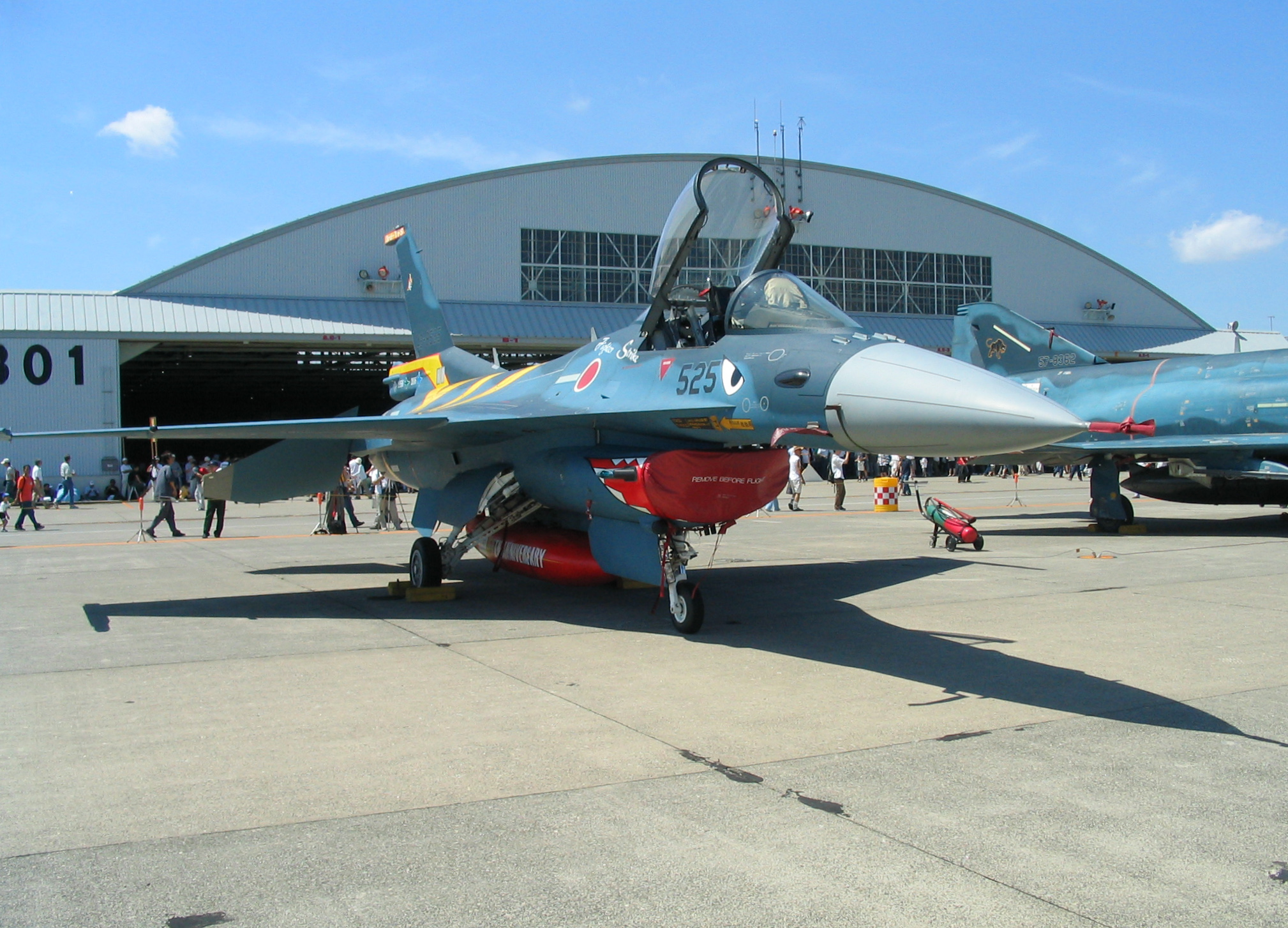
Mitsubishi F-2

The FS-X program highlighted some of the struggles the Japanese defense industry faced.

The program originally aimed for the development of an indigenous fighter jet to succeed the Mitsubishi F-1. Japanese defense contractors sought for domestic development to develop skills in manufacturing future aircraft and to preserve Japan's aviation industry. However, under U.S. pressure, the program switched to a jointly developed fighter based on the F-16.

The program drew criticism in Japan due to the government bowing to U.S. pressure. Japanese defense contractors and lawmakers were irate that the U.S. would gain access to advanced Japanese technology through the deal and local industries would not be able to profit as much compared to domestically developing the aircraft. There was also the belief that a domestically designed fighter would be superior to a modified F-16 design.

Further criticism was drawn from delays in the F-2's production, high production cost (about four times more expensive than a Block 50/52 F-16), and reduction of units from 141 aircraft to 94.

==== X-2 Shinshin ====
The development of the Mitsubishi X-2 is to help develop technologies and knowledge needed to produce a sixth-generation stealth fighter to succeed the Mitsubishi F-2. The X-2 made its historic maiden flight on 22 April 2016, cementing Japan as the fourth country in the world to fly their own stealth jet. The X-2's development is seen by other major military powers as a sign of Japan's aerospace and defense industry's revitalization. The MOD emphasized that the procurement of the future stealth fighter will be led by Japan, but international collaboration is still a possibility.

=== Arms export ===
For Japan, the benefits of exporting arms to another country includes improving economy of scale in the defense industry, lowering unit cost of the product and strengthen international relationships. Following the end of the self imposed ban in 2014, Japan began to promote its arms to the international market and has attracted a number of countries interest in Japanese arms. Japan secured its first export on 17 July 2014 by supplying gyroscopes to the U.S. to develop PAC-2 missiles for Qatar. On 13 May 2015, Japan hosted its first military trade fair. Despite the efforts, Japan continues to struggle with securing a major export deal. One issue Japan faces when exporting arms is the product's high unit cost and unique domestic requirements that might not be favorable for outside customers. In this regard, some have noted that Japan's defense industry suffers from Galápagos syndrome. Another issue Japan faces is its lack of experience in exporting arms, exporting untested products and facing major competition against established suppliers. There is also hesitation for Japanese companies to participate due to arms sales representing a small amount of revenue and/or fear of reputation damage at home by being labeled as "merchants of death".

==== SEA 1000 future submarine program ====
Japan's unsuccessful attempt at exporting the Sōryū-class submarine to Australia highlighted Japan's major weaknesses in exporting arms to another country. The project, worth A$50 billion to replace Australia's ageing fleet of Collins-class submarines, could have been Japan's first major arms export since lifting the export ban in 2014, but it ultimately lost to French firm Direction des Constructions Navales Services (DCNS) with their proposal on a conventionally powered variant of the Barracuda-class submarine. Some major weakness shown was Japan's lack of experience exporting arms and competition against more experienced competitors. Initially, Japan enjoyed an advantage over other competition (with some speculation that the Sōryū-class has been pre-selected) because of the close relationship between then-Australian Prime Minister Tony Abbott and Prime Minister Shinzō Abe to bolster Australian-Japan strategic relationship and U.S. backing on selecting the Japanese submarines. Following dwindling public support, in February 2015 Tony Abbott announced a competitive evaluation process which pitted Mitsubishi Heavy Industries (MHI) and Kawasaki Shipbuilding Corp. (KSC) against more experienced French firm DCNS and German firm ThyssenKrupp AG (TKMS). One major requirement for the submarine program is that the submarines are to be built domestically to support local industries and jobs. Japan was initially reluctant to build submarines overseas and transfer technologies to Australia to aid in the future submarine's development. DCNS and TKMS agreed to the Australian government's demand for domestic production, which coincided with public interest. Another issue Japan faced was the Sōryū-class inability to meet Australia's submarine requirement. It has been pointed out that the Sōryū-class has a shorter range and speed than the Collins-class, Japanese submarines possess a shorter service life than Australia's, and there are uncertainties on whether the Sōryū-class can be modified for Australia's requirements. Ultimately, Japan's loss highlighted the country's over-reliance on political support from Tony Abbott (which ended with Malcolm Turnbull replacing him), inability to appeal to the Australian public, and inexperience exporting arms, allowing overseas production and modifying domestic weapons for foreign customers.

== See also ==
- Defense industry of Russia
- Defense industry of Taiwan
- Defense industry of South Korea
