= Hayabusa-class patrol boat =

Class of Japanese patrol boats

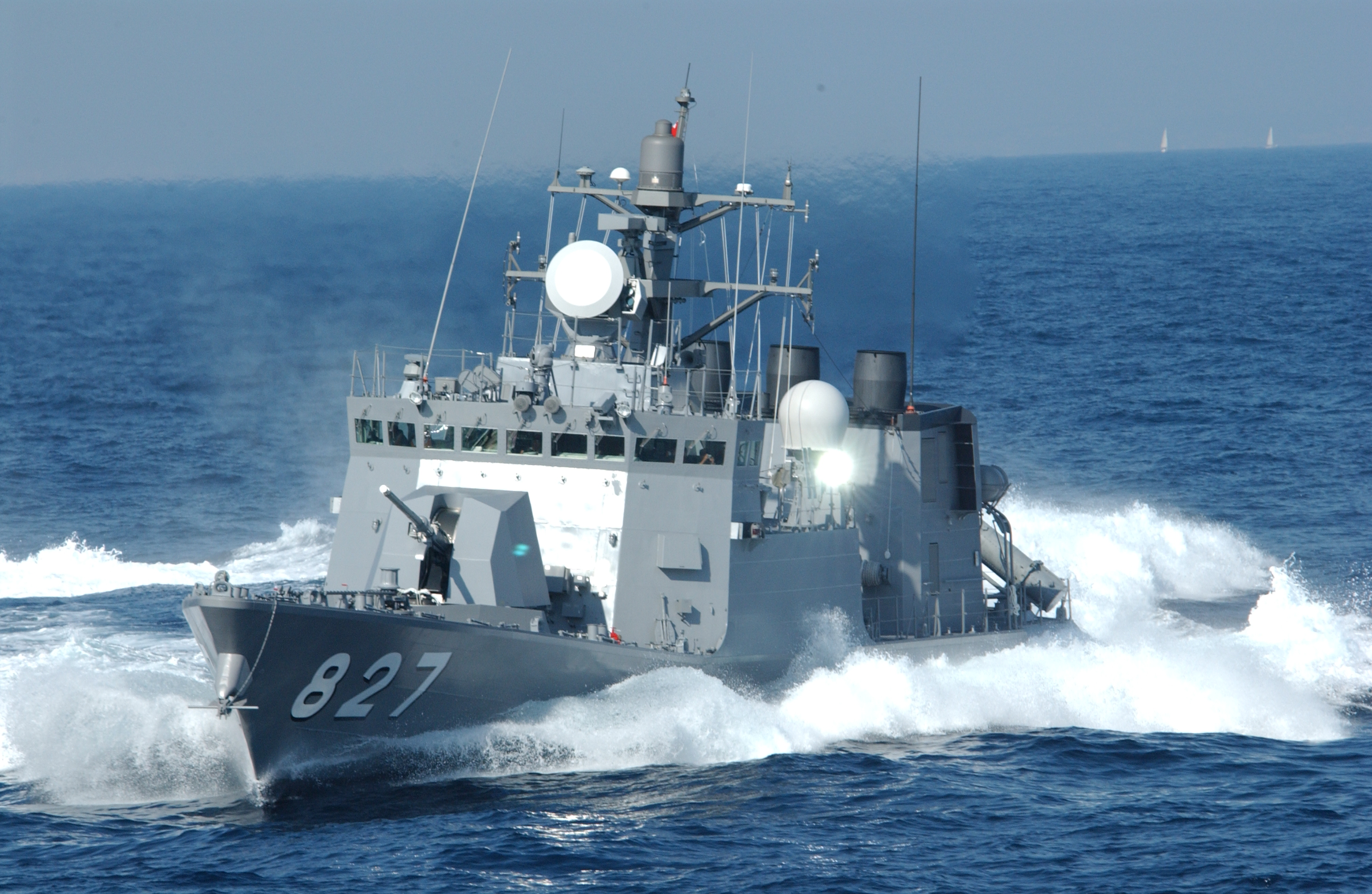
- JS Kumataka

Class overview
- Builders: Mitsubishi, Shimonoseki
- Operators: Japan Maritime Self-Defense Force
- Preceded by: PG 1-go class
- Succeeded by: Sakura class
- Planned: 6
- Completed: 6
- Active: 6

General characteristics
- Type: Patrol boat
- Displacement: 200 tonnes standard displacement; 240 tonnes full load
- Length: 50.1 m (164 ft 4 in)
- Beam: 8.4 m (27 ft 7 in)
- Draft: 4.2 m (13 ft 9 in)
- Propulsion: 3 × General Electric LM500-G07 gas turbine; 3 × Pump-jet propulsion
- Speed: 46 knots (85 km/h; 53 mph)
- Complement: 21
- Sensors & processing systems: OYQ-8B Information processor; Tactical Digital Information Link; OPS-18-3 surface search radar; OPS-20 navigation radar; OAX-2 optronic sight; FCS-2-31C Gun FCS
- Electronic warfare & decoys: 2 × Mk 36 decoys
- Armament: 4 × SSM-1B SSM; 1 × Otobreda 76 mm gun; 2 × 12.7 mm machine gun M2

The Hayabusa-class is a guided missile patrol boat class of the Japan Maritime Self-Defense Force (JMSDF). Six boats were built between 2002-04.

The Japan Maritime Self-Defense Force initially built three hydrofoil missile boats of the PG 1-go class between 1993-95. The Hayabusa-class was designed to correct the issues that arose with the preceding class. After an incident off the Noto Peninsula involving a North Korean spy ship, two ships of the class were included in the 1999 fiscal year plan.

== Outline ==
=== Hull ===
The boat's displacement was enlarged to four times that of the PG 1-go class to improve seaworthiness. The maximum speed was increased to improve the ability to intercept ships; however, the speed increase proved to be difficult to implement.

Both double-hull and single-hull designs were considered; the single-hull design was selected for reasons of hull strength and seaworthiness. The hull is long and narrow with a V-shaped bottom, allowing for a high hull speed and improved high-speed stability.

Stealth characteristics were incorporated. The slope of the superstructure, designed to minimize direct radar reflection, was chosen using computer simulation of the radar cross section. The tripod mast and 76 mm gun also have stealth features.

=== Propulsion ===
Three LM500-G07 gas turbine engines, built under license from General Electric by Ishikawajima-Harima, provide the main propulsion.

=== Armament ===
The main armament is a pair of SSM-1B ship-to-ship missile twin launchers installed in the stern and an Otobreda 76 mm gun on the front deck. Additionally, two 12.7 mm M2 machine guns are installed on the back of the bridge.

The weapons systems for the Hayabusa-class are controlled by the OYQ-8B Tactical Data Processing System. It uses a smaller AN/UYK-44 computer, which is vastly superior to the previous generation AN/UYK-20. Also, it is capable of supporting Link 11 data link, which the previous OYQ-5 and UYK-20 system was not able to. As a result, it is now able to provide supporting data to other ships and aircraft. This enhances offensive and defensive capability, as they can now feed data into the larger Maritime Operation Force System of the Self Defense Forces.

== List of ships ==
Name	Number	Laid down	Launched	Commissioned	Status
Hayabusa(はやぶさ)	PG-824	9 November 2000	13 June 2001	25 March 2002	Active
Wakataka(わかたか)	PG-825	9 November 2000	13 June 2001	25 March 2002	Active
Otaka (おおたか)	PG-826	2 October 2001	13 May 2002	24 March 2003	Active
Kumataka (くまたか)	PG-827	2 October 2001	2 August 2002	24 March 2003	Active
Umitaka (うみたか)	PG-828	4 October 2002	21 May 2003	24 March 2004	Active
Shirataka (しらたか)	PG-829	4 October 2002	8 August 2003	24 March 2004	Active

== In Media ==
The Umitaka features in the Light Novel, Manga, and Anime adaptation of GATE.
