= J/FPS-5 =

Japanese 3D AESA radar

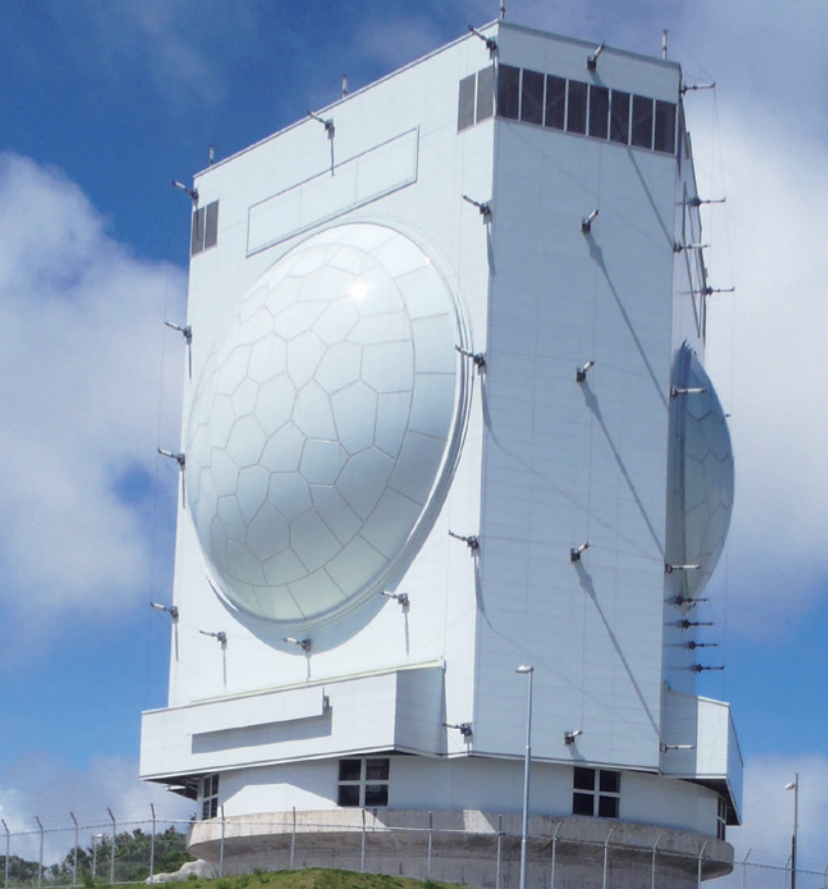
- J/FPS-5
- Country of origin: Japan
- Manufacturer: Mitsubishi Electric
- Designer: Acquisition, Technology & Logistics Agency
- Introduced: 2008
- Type: 3D AESA
- Frequency: S band and L band
- Diameter: one 18m and two 12m

The J/FPS-5, or also known as the Gamera Radar, is an airspace warning and control radar device operated by the Japan Air Self-Defense Force. It is a large fixed 3D radar for radar sites, and is a phased array radar that uses an active phased array antenna (AESA) and is also capable of detecting and tracking ballistic missiles. It was made by Mitsubishi Electric.

== Introduction ==
The 34m-tall hexagonal building has a giant radar surface on each of its three side walls. Due to the circular pattern on its cover resembles a turtle shell, it is also called the "Gamera Radar" after the monster Gamera from Daiei (now Kadokawa Films).

The central one of the three sides has an L- and S-band radar under a 18m diameter cover, which is the main surveillance surface for aircraft and ballistic missiles. The remaining two sides have L-band radar under 12m diameter coverings, which are surveillance surfaces for aircraft. The entire building can rotate, so it can be aimed towards the area of higher threats if needed.

It is a bistatic radar that can detect difficult-to-detect targets such as stealth aircraft by receiving radio waves transmitted by adjacent radars. In addition, it has a fault-tolerant function that isolates the faulty part and distributes the function to the remaining parts. It is composed of modules that separate basic functions (aircraft detection and tracking) and additional functions (ballistic missile detection and tracking, bistatic reception, target classification, etc.).。The numerous small protrusions on the surface are insulators and the supportive structures that support the dome, and the thin wires that connect them are for protection against lightning strikes.

If an approaching ballistic missile is detected, data is first sent to the Air Defense Command / BMD Joint Task Force, which then passes it on to the prime minister and other ministries and agencies via the Ministry of Defense. The Ministry of Internal Affairs and Communications then transmits the warning to the mass media and local governments through the nationwide instantaneous warning system. The public will thus be instructed to take self-protection measures, such as taking shelter indoors, via the news and disaster prevention radio. There is also consideration of using the system to monitor space debris in the future.

== Development ==
In the early days, Japan had not yet possessed early warning satellite, while existing radars lack the ability to warn of North Korean incoming ballistic missiles in an early phase. Therefore, in 1999, the Technical Research and Development Institute (the preceding body of Acquisition, Technology & Logistics Agency) began development of a radar capable of detecting ballistic missiles, under a program coded FPS-XX. Technical tests were first carried out using a research prototype built at the Iioka Branch of the Second Research Institute in Asahi City, Chiba Prefecture. And from 2004, practical tests were simultaneously carried out by the Iioka Test and Evaluation Unit of the Electronic Development and Test Group of the Aviation Development and Test Group. The research prototype has one main surface and one warning surface, and can be rotated along with the building.

Development was scheduled to end in fiscal year 2005, and the research prototype was to be dismantled. However, it was decided to leave it in place to conduct operational research until the mass production model was deployed. It was not used in North Korea's 2006 missile launch test, as the ballistic missile disintegrated in mid-air immediately after launch, but it successfully tracked a ballistic missile in the 2009 North Korean missile launch.

== Deployment ==
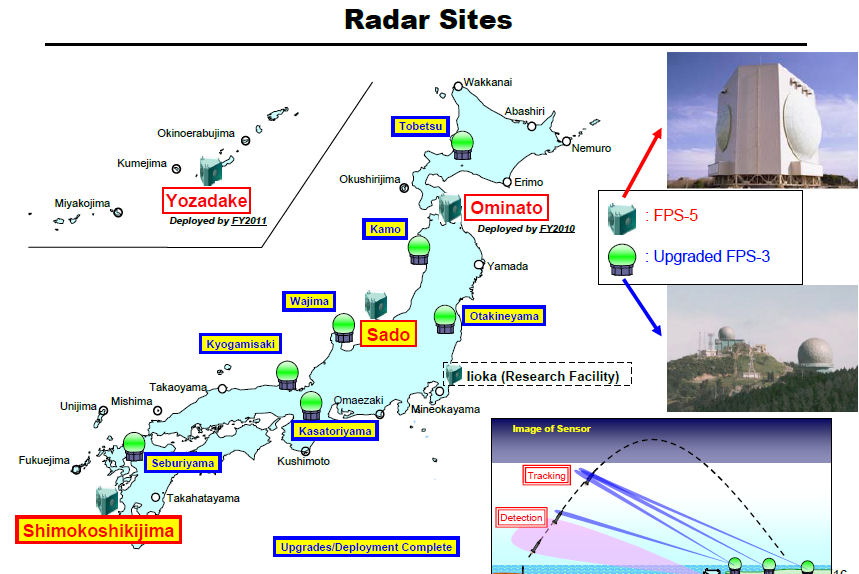
Nationwide deployment of the radar system.

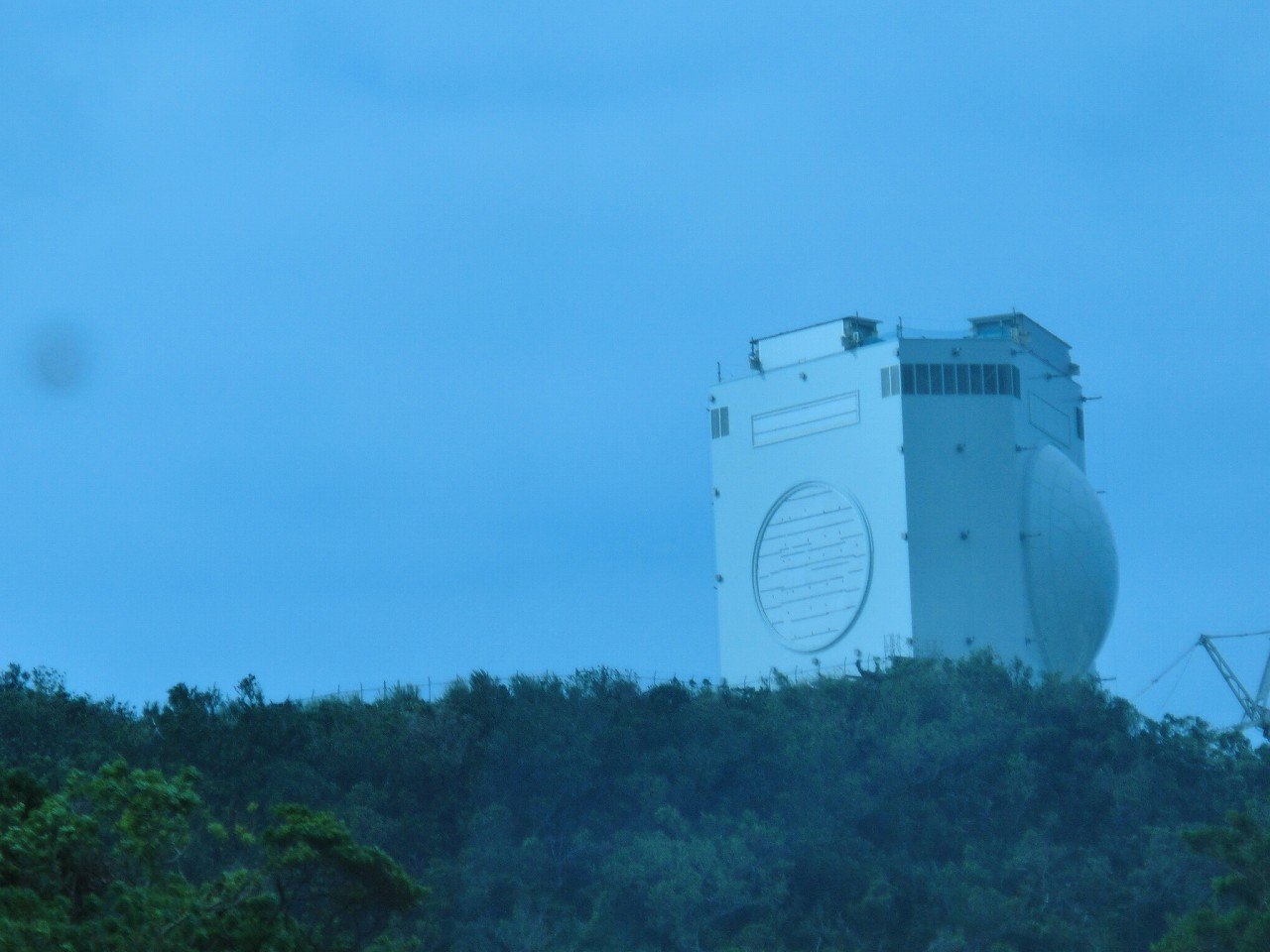
J/FPS-5 at JASDF Yozadake Sub Base in the Okinawa Prefecture

The budget was allocated from 2006 to 2009, and four units were deployed between 2008 and 2011. Each unit costs about 18 billion yen. Because they are large, not only the acquisition costs but also the civil engineering costs for installation are expensive, so procurement ended after four units.There are four subtypes up to type D, and existing ones are also being updated.

- JASDF Shimo-Koshikijima Sub Base: It was deployed since the end of 2008, where it was deployed to replace J/FPS-2.
- JASDF Sado Sub Base: The J/FPS-5B was deployed in July 2010 as a replacement for J/FPS-2. It was then in November 2019 where the system was upgraded to J/FPS-5D。
- JASDF Ominato Sub Base: It was deployed in the end of 2010 as a replacement for the original J/FPS-2 system.The budgetary funding started in Heisei 20, when the J/FPS-5B was deployed.
- JASDF Yozadake Sub Base: Deployed since the end of 2011 as an upgraded replacement of the J/FPS-2. The budgetary funding started in Heisei 21, when the J/FPS-5C was deployed.

== See also ==
- Missile defense
- Missile defense systems by country
- Japan Ground Self-Defense Force
- PAVE PAWS
