= Acquisition, Technology & Logistics Agency =

Agency under the Ministry of Defense of Japan

- 防衛装備庁; Bōei sōbi-chō

Agency overview
- Formed: October 1, 2015
- Preceding agency: Technical Research and Development Institute
- Jurisdiction: Japan
- Headquarters: 5-1 Ichigaya honmuracho, Shinjuku-ku, Tokyo 162-8870, Japan
- Employees: Approx. 1800: (Approx. 1400 Civilians); (Approx. 400 Uniformed officers)
- Agency executive: Hazime Aoyagi, Commissioner
- Parent agency: Ministry of Defense
- Website: In Japanese; In English

The Acquisition, Technology & Logistics Agency (防衛装備庁, Bōei sōbi-chō; ATLA) is an agency established under the Japanese Ministry of Defense that handles project management, technology management, research and development, and procurement of defense equipment for the Japan Self-Defense Forces. ATLA is a part of the defense policy of then-Prime Minister Shinzō Abe to bolster the military by streamlining and reforming the country's defense industry and military equipment acquisition.

== History ==
In 2014, the Ministry of Defense began to implement reforms to adapt to the increasing tensions in security environment surrounding Japan and the changes in defense policy under Prime Minister Shinzō Abe. As part of the Medium Term Defense Program (FY 2014-2018) the Ministry of Defense pursued organizational restructuring, which includes the integration of all departments that handles equipment acquisition into one agency.

The Ministry of Defense included the reforms in the FY2015 defense budget; which included the establishment of ATLA and reorganization of the Internal Bureau to accompany with ATLA's establishment. ATLA's formation involved integrating any divisions related to procurement or research and development from other departments into one bureau. These departments include the Internal Bureau's Bureau of Finance & Equipment, Staff Offices, Technical Research and Development Institute (TRDI), and Equipment Procurement and Construction Office.

ATLA was formed on October 1, 2015.

== Duties ==
ATLA manages the research and development and procurement of military technology for Japan, through by collaborations with universities, or domestic/international industry companies.

== Organization ==
=== Senior officials ===
Senior officials at the "Director General" (部長) level and above are as follows.

- Commissioner, ATLA (防衛装備庁長官)
- Vice-Commissioner and Chief Technology Officer (防衛技監)
- Director General of Joint Systems (長官官房装備官（統合装備担当）)
- Director General of Ground Systems (長官官房装備官（陸上担当）)
- Director General of Naval Systems (長官官房装備官（海上担当）)
- Director General of Aerial Systems (長官官房装備官（航空担当）)
- Assistant Commissioner (長官官房審議官)
- Director General, Department of Equipment Policy (装備政策部長)
- Director General, Department of Project Management (プロジェクト管理部長)
- Director General, Department of Technology Strategy (技術戦略部長)
- Director General, Department of Procurement Management (調達管理部長)
- Director General, Department of Procurement Operations (調達事業部長)
- 長官官房装備官（陸上担当） Director General of Ground Systems 長官官房装備官（海上担当） Director General of Naval Systems 長官官房装備官（航空担当） Director General of Aerial Systems 長官官房審議官 Assistant Commissioner 装備政策部長 Director General, Department of Equipment Policy プロジェクト管理部長 Director General, Department of Project Management 技術戦略部長 Director General, Department of Technology Strategy 調達管理部長 Director General, Department of Procurement Management 調達事業部長 Director General, Department of Procurement Operations

=== Departments ===
The following are ATLA's organizational departments.

- Secretariat (長官官房)
- Department of Equipment Policy (装備政策部)
- Department of Project Management (プロジェクト管理部)
- Department of Technology Strategy (技術戦略部)
- Department of Procurement Management (調達管理部)
- Department of Procurement Operations (調達事業部)
- Research centers and test centers
  - Research centers
    - Air Systems Research Center (航空装備研究所)
    - Ground Systems Research Center (陸上装備研究所)
    - Naval Systems Research Center (艦艇装備研究所)
    - Future Capabilities Development Center (次世代装備研究所)
  - Test Centers
    - Chitose Test Center (千歳試験場)
    - Shimokita Test Center (下北試験場)
    - Gifu Test Center (岐阜試験場)

== Active projects ==
=== Aerial systems ===
- UH-X helicopter
- I3 fighter
- UAV
- Scramjet
- F-X fighter

=== Ground systems ===
- Light-weight combat vehicle
- Replacement for Type 96 armored personnel carrier
- Amphibious obstacle clearance system (mine clearance system)
- Future Amphibious Technology
- EMP ammunition
- Railguns
- Active protection system
- Counter-IED systems
- Hybrid Propulsion Systems
- Future Light-weight Bridge
- Advanced Anti-surface Warhead Technology
- Remote Controlled Engineering Vehicle System for CBRN Threats

=== Naval systems ===
- Unmanned underwater vehicle

=== Missile systems ===
- Type 03 Chū-SAM Kai
- ASM-3
- Standard Missile-3 Block II A

=== Electronic systems ===
- High Power Laser System
- Radar-IR Combined Sensor System

=== Others ===
- Powered exoskeleton
- Human-robot cooperation technology
- Multipurpose Autonomous Robot Vehicle

== Completed projects ==
=== Aerial systems ===
- Mitsubishi X-2 Shinshin
- Kawasaki C-2
- Kawasaki P-1

=== Ground systems ===
- Type 16 maneuver combat vehicle
- NBC reconnaissance vehicle
- Type 19 155 mm wheeled self-propelled howitzer

=== Naval systems ===
- Mogami-class frigate
- Izumo-class multi-purpose destroyer
- Asahi-class destroyer
- Sōryū-class submarine
- Awaji-class minesweeper
- Future Multi Purpose Trimaran concept

=== Missile systems ===
- Type 12 surface-to-ship missile
- AAM-5B

== See also ==
- J/FPS-5
