= Type 82 =

Type 82 may refer to the following:

- Type 82 artillery, a Chinese multiple rocket launcher
- Type 82 destroyer, a British warship
- Type 82, a Chinese-made version of the Polish PM-63 submachine gun
- Type 82 Volkswagen Kübelwagen, a German military vehicle
- GSL 131 a.k.a. Type 82, a Chinese mine-clearing armoured bulldozer
- Type 82 Command and Communication Vehicle, a Japanese 6×6 armoured command vehicle
- Type 82 hand grenade
- Model 1981 "Shin'heung" (also known as Type 82 tank), a North Korean amphibious light tank also known as the PT-85
