= Type 77 hand grenade =

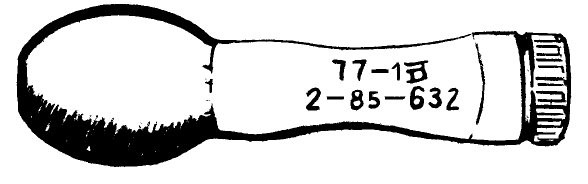
- Type 77-1 grenade drawing
- Type: Hand grenade
- Place of origin: People's Republic of China

Service history
- In service: 1977 - present

Production history
- Produced: 1980 - present

The Type 77 hand grenade (Chinese: 77式木柄手榴彈, lit. 'Type 77 Wooden Handle Hand Grenade') is a type of hand grenade produced by the People's Republic of China. It is reportedly marketed by Norinco.

== History ==
The Type 77 was first designed in 1977 with the first grenades made in 1980 to replace the Type 67 hand grenade. It was later replaced by the Type 82 hand grenade.

=== Combat Use ===
During the 1990s in British Hong Kong, Type 67 and 77 grenades were widely used by armed criminals conducting heists when they are able to acquire them from China.

== Design ==
The Type 77 is based on the Type 67, which was inspired by the Stielhandgranate design, in particular, the Model 24. Compared to the Type 67, the Type 77 is filled with more explosives, while being lighter and compact in shape.

The TNT filler weighs around 70 grams. It weighs around 380 grams with a fuze delay of 2.8 to 4 seconds and a lethal radius of 7 meters.

The Type 95 Personal Combat Gear has grenade pouches that can store the Type 67 with the Type 77 stick grenades with the Type 82s.

== Variants ==
The Type 77 consists of the Type 77-1, Type 77-2, Type 77-4, and Type 77-5.

== Users ==
- China

== See also ==
- Type 67 hand grenade – (China)
- Type 82 hand grenade – (China)
- Type 86 hand grenade – (China)
- DSS-161 – (China)

== Bibliography ==
- Cheng, Joseph Y. S; Kwong, Paul C.K., eds. (1992). The Other Hong Kong Report 1992. Oxford: Chinese University of Hong Kong Press. ISBN 978-9622015630.
- Lai, Benjamin (2012). The Chinese People’s Liberation Army since 1949. Oxford: Osprey Publishing. ISBN 978-1472845337.
