= Type 67 hand grenade =

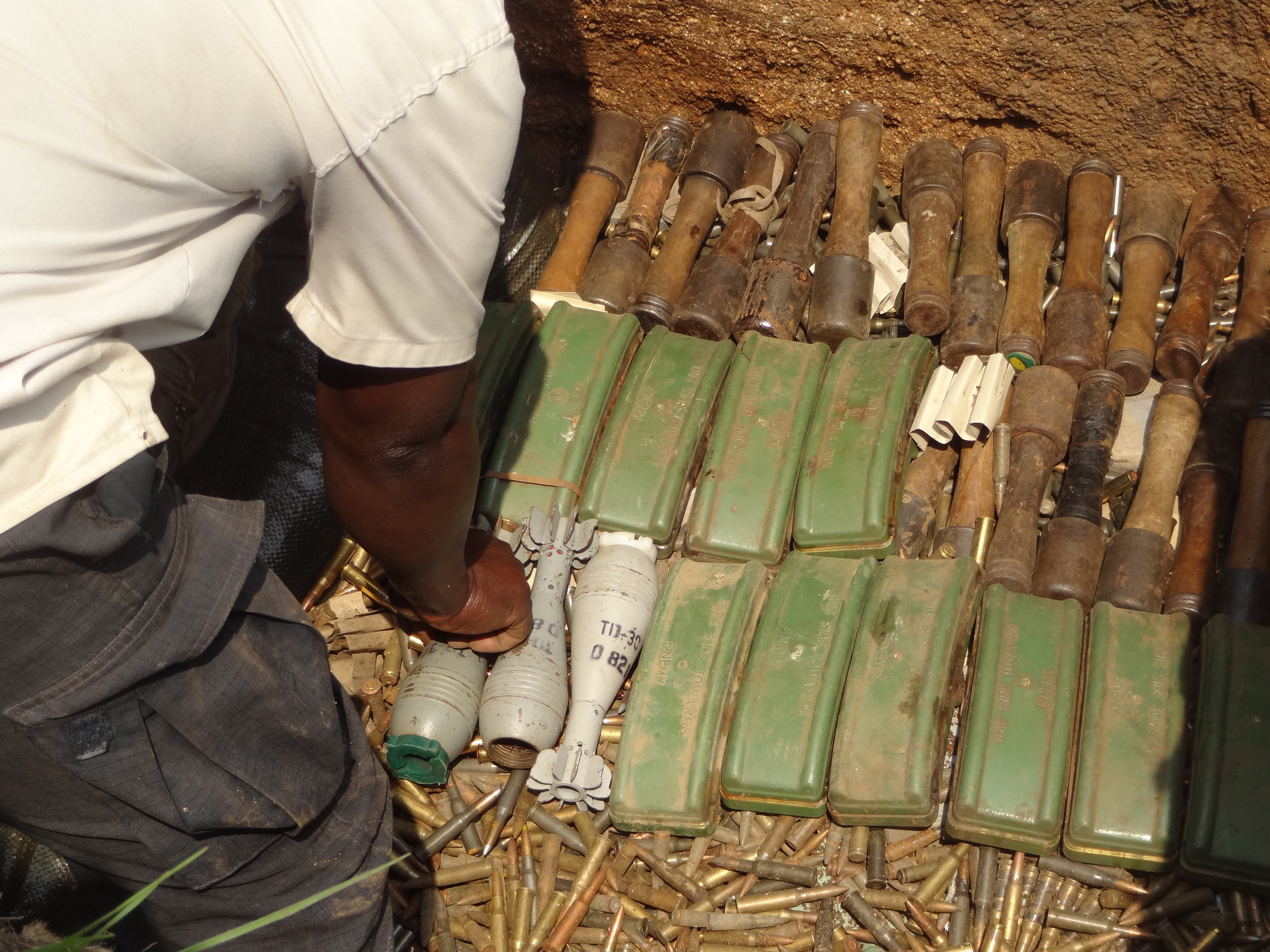
- An EOD operator proceeding many Type 67 hand grenades found during the MONUSCO missions
- Type: Hand grenade
- Place of origin: People's Republic of China

Service history
- In service: 1967 - present
- Wars: First Indochina War; Vietnam War; Sino-Vietnam War

Production history
- Produced: 1967 - present
- No. built: 20 billion units

The Type 67 hand grenade (Chinese: 67式木柄手榴彈, lit. 'Type 67 Wooden Handle Hand Grenade') is a type of hand grenade produced by the People's Republic of China. It is sometimes known as Chicom.

== History ==
During the Second Sino-Japanese War (1937–1945), the Chinese designed and produced a grenade based on the Model 1924 which was used by the National Revolutionary Army. Such grenades were the main type of grenade used by Chinese forces during the whole war.

In 1939, a new design with a smaller handle and much more compressed explosive load began trials. The resulting model was lighter and more powerful and the ordnance office decreed it to be the new standard type in all arsenals. Known early copies of the Stielhandgranate include the Type 51 hand grenade (Chinese: 51式木柄手榴彈, lit. 'Type 51 Wooden Handle Hand Grenade').

After World War II, the People's Liberation Army standardized a variant of the grenade, designated "Type 67".

=== Combat Use ===
The Type 67 became the standard hand grenade for the People’s Liberation Army, which becomes the basis for the Type 77.

The grenade was first used by Chinese troops in the Korean War. They were heavily used during various operations. In the Battle of the Paracel Islands, the Maritime Militia used the Type 67 against South Vietnamese troops.

During the First Indochina War, the Vietnamese copied the Chinese grenades and used them to fight against French forces. The Type 67 was also supplied in huge numbers to the Viet Cong and the People's Army of Vietnam during the Vietnam War.

During the 1990s in British Hong Kong, Type 67 and 77 grenades were widely used by armed criminals conducting heists when they are able to acquire them from China.

== Design ==
The Type 67 is based on the Stielhandgranate design, in particular, the Model 24. Just like German troops, Chinese soldiers often bundled Type 67 grenades together to blast open fortifications, vehicles and the like. Another tactic was to tie a grenade to a long bamboo stick, for example to stick up over a wall or into a window.

The Type 67 was a simple design and was mass-produced in large numbers, not only in arsenals (primarily in the 1st, 11th, 21st, 24th, 25th and 30th), but also by hand with the help of civilians. Hundreds of thousands of grenades were produced each month. There were some variations in the design, but most followed the same basic pattern: A wooden handle with a round or cylindrical warhead and a slow burning fuse. The charge was a mixture of TNT and potassium nitrate, and they were generally somewhat weaker than their German counterpart.

It's composed of an iron shell with 38 grams of TNT, which is used with a pull-fire delay fuse. The Type 67 is 20 cm. long and weighs 600 grams with a fragmentation radius of 7 meters.

The Type 95 Personal Combat Gear has grenade pouches that can store the Type 67 with the Type 77 stick grenades with the Type 82s.

== Variants ==
A North Vietnamese clone was made based on the Type 67.

== Users ==
- China: Used by the PLA.
- North Vietnam: Known to be used by the North Vietnamese Army.

=== Non-State Actors ===
- Viet Cong

== See also ==
- Type 77 hand grenade – (China)
- Type 82 hand grenade – (China)
- Type 86 hand grenade – (China)
- DSS-161 – (China)

== Bibliography ==
- Cheng, Joseph Y. S; Kwong, Paul C.K., eds. (1992). The Other Hong Kong Report 1992. Oxford: Chinese University of Hong Kong Press. ISBN 978-9622015630.
- Lai, Benjamin (2012). The Chinese People’s Liberation Army since 1949. Oxford: Osprey Publishing. ISBN 978-1472845337.
- McNab, Chris (2022). US Soldier Vs Chinese Soldier: Korea 1951–53. Bloomsbury Publishing. ISBN 978-1472845320.
- McWilliams, Bill (2015). On Hallowed Ground: The Last Battle for Pork Chop Hill. Oxford: Open Road Mediag. ISBN 978-0425199268.
- Rottman, Gordon L. (2009). World War II Axis Booby Traps and Sabotage Tactics. Oxford: Osprey Publishing. ISBN 978-1846034503.
- Rottman, Gordon L. (2015). The Hand Grenade. Oxford: Osprey Publishing. ISBN 978-1472807359.
- Rottman, Gordon L. (2020). Vietnam War Booby Traps. Oxford: Osprey Publishing. ISBN 978-1472842459.
- Bin, Shih (2021). China’s Small Arms of the 2nd Sino-Japanese War (1937-1945). ISBN 979-8473557848.
