= Type 86 =

Type 86 may refer to:

- A People's Republic of China reversed engineered version of the BMP-1 armoured personnel carrier, see Type 86 (infantry fighting vehicle)
- Norinco Type 86 assault rifle
- T86 assault rifle or Type 86 assault rifle
- Bristol Type 86 biplane
- Type 86 hand grenade

== See also ==
- Class 86 (disambiguation)
