= Chemical Reconnaissance Vehicle =

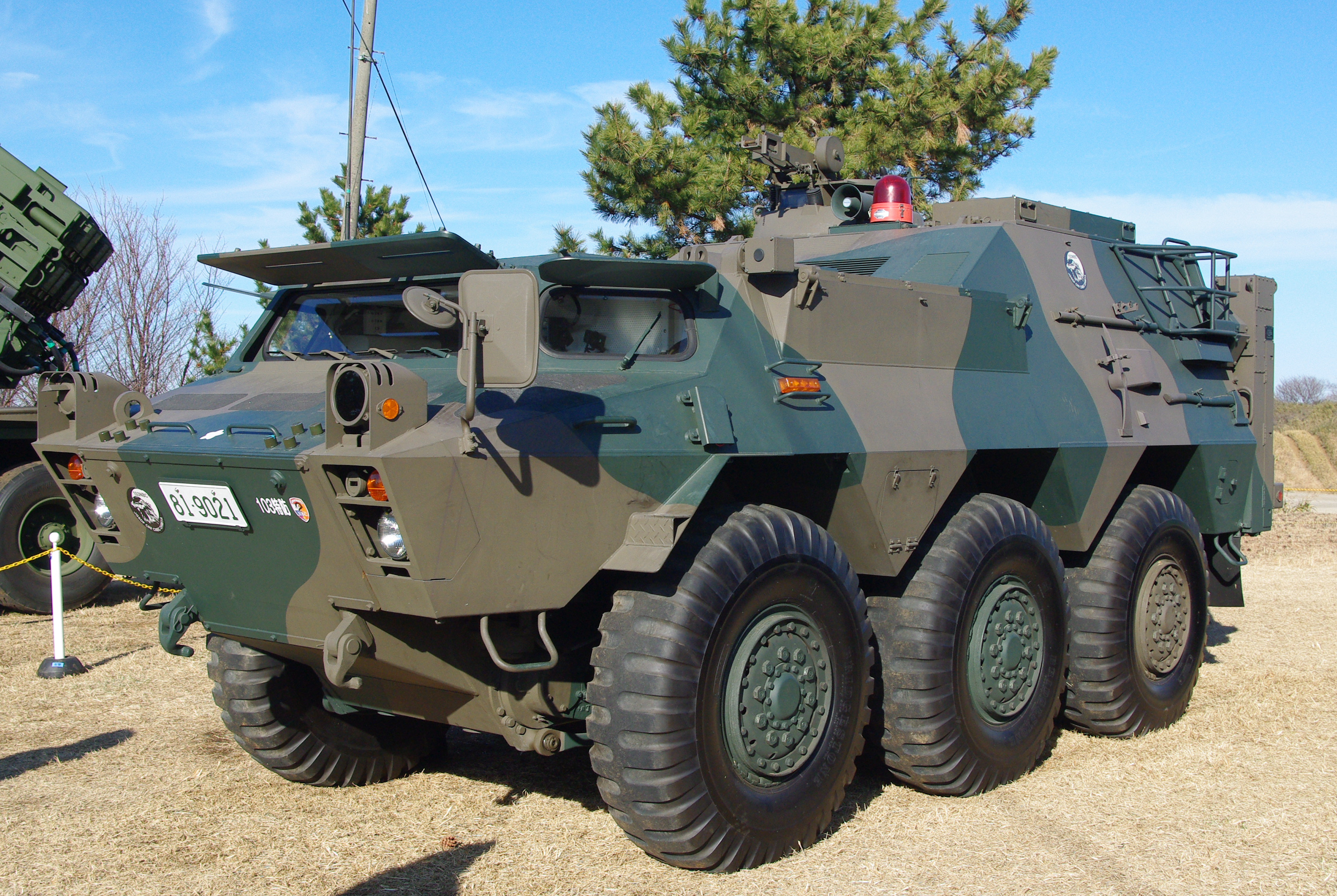
- A Chemical Reconnaissance Vehicle in Narashino, Chiba
- Type: Chemical, radiological, and nuclear reconnaissance vehicle
- Place of origin: Japan

Service history
- In service: 1987–…
- Used by: Japan Ground Self-Defense Force

Production history
- Designer: Technical Research and Development Institute
- Manufacturer: Komatsu
- Developed from: Type 82 Command and Communication Vehicle
- Produced: 1987–2009
- No. built: 47

Specifications
- Mass: 14.1 t (13.9 long tons; 15.5 short tons)
- Length: 6.10 m (20.0 ft)
- Width: 2.48 m (8 ft 2 in)
- Height: 2.38 m (7 ft 10 in)
- Crew: 4
- Main armament: 12.7 mm M2HB machine gun
- Engine: Isuzu 10PBI 4-stroke V10 liquid-cooled diesel 305 hp (227 kW) (2,700 rpm)
- Power/weight: 21.63 hp/t (16.13 kW/t)
- Drive: 6×6
- Operational range: 500 km (310 mi)
- Maximum speed: 95 km/h (59 mph)

The Chemical Reconnaissance Vehicle (化学防護車, Kagaku-bougo-sha) is an armoured vehicle, which is used for detecting chemical, radiological, and nuclear hazards. The vehicle is built by Komatsu and it is a derivative of the Type 82 Command and Communication Vehicle. The Chemical Reconnaissance Vehicle entered service in 1987 in the Japan Ground Self-Defense Force, which received 47 vehicles of this type.

== History ==
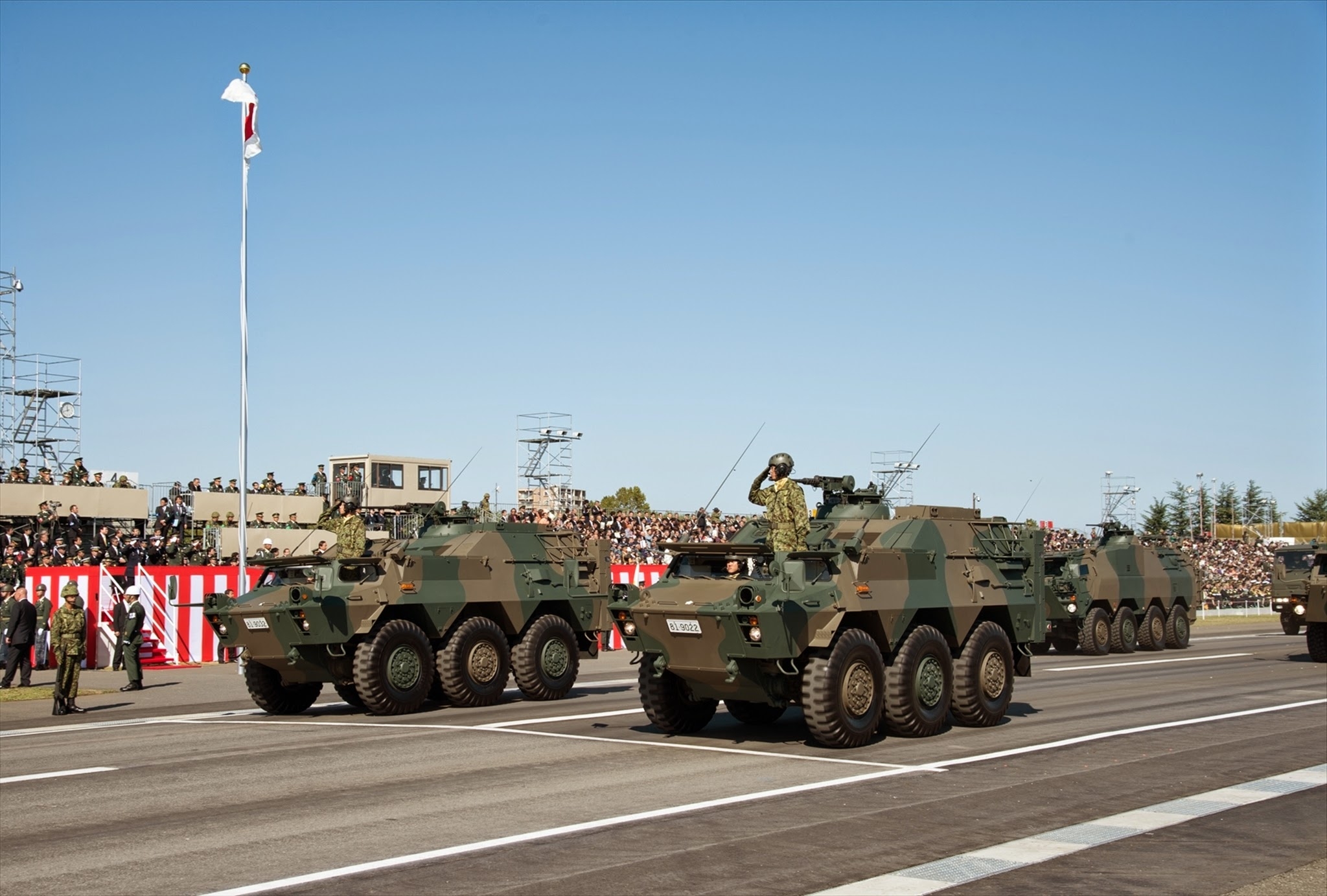
Chemical Reconnaissance Vehicles (front) with newer NBC reconnaissance vehicles (rear) in a military parade

Development of the Chemical Reconnaissance Vehicle started after the Type 82 Command and Communication Vehicle entered service. First vehicles of the type were deployed in 1987, and additional vehicles were delivered over more than two decades. In 1999, production switched to a version with improved sensors.

By 2009, 47 vehicles had been procured, mainly deployed in chemical departments such as the Central Special Weapon Protection Corps (Omiya Garrison), Special Weapon Protection Corps and Chemical Protection Platoon in each division and brigade. Procurement price was listed at approximately 200 million yen in 2009.

According to the United Nations Register of Conventional Arms, 47 Chemical Reconnaissance Vehicles were in service in 2012. After 2012, the number of vehicles has been steadily decreasing. In 2024, Japan reported that 30 Chemical Reconnaissance Vehicles were still in service.

== Characteristics ==
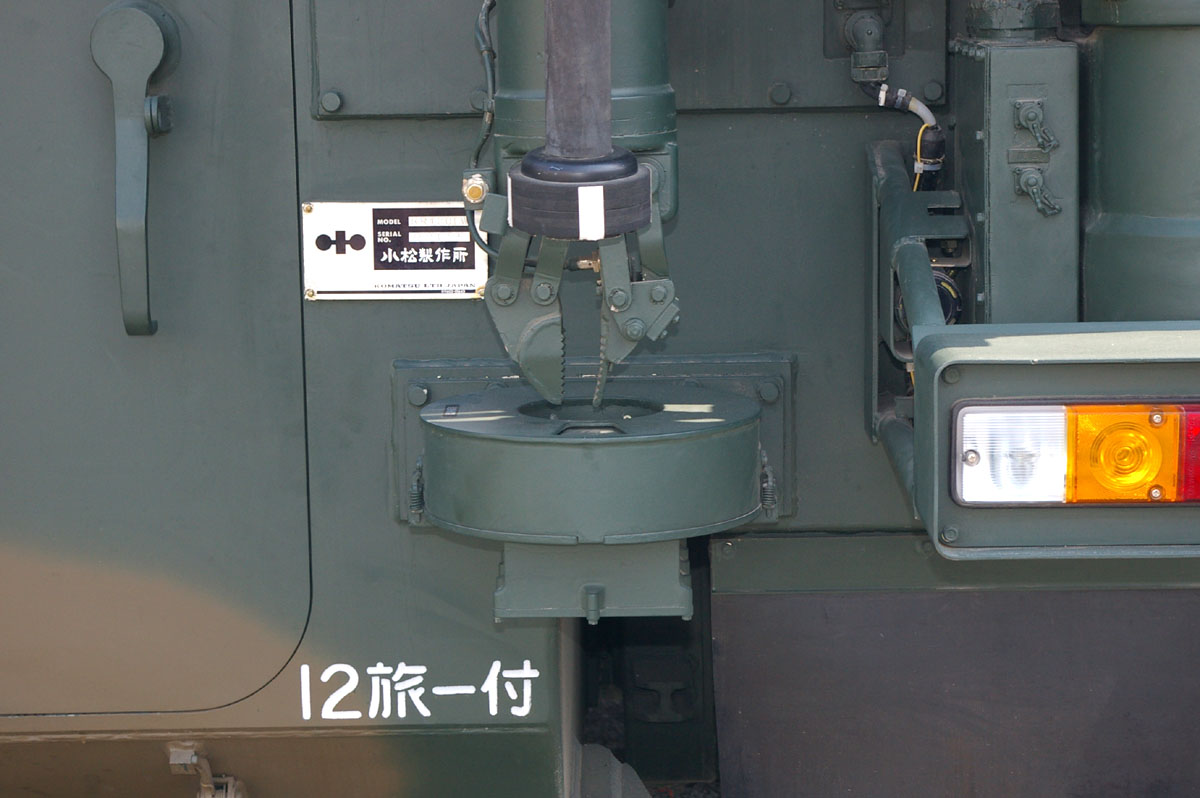
A close-up view of the manipulator for collecting soil samples

The Chemical Reconnaissance Vehicle is very similar to the Type 82 Command and Communication Vehicle. The chassis and automotive components remain the same, although the Chemical Reconnaissance Vehicle carries specialist equipment. The vehicle is equipped with an improved nuclear, biological, and chemical protection system.

The Chemical Reconnaissance Vehicle can mount a set of plates for neutron shielding made of lead glass to its front. Specialised equipment includes radiation and gas detectors, personal protective equipment, and a manipulator on the right rear of the vehicle, which is used to remotely collect soil samples. On the left rear of the chassis, in addition to meteorological instrumentation, there is a device for placing flags to mark contaminated areas.

The Chemical Reconnaissance Vehicle is not designed for direct combat, which is why it only carries armament for self-defence. For that purpose, the vehicle has a 12.7 mm M2HB machine gun with 500 rounds of ammunition.
