= Type 82 Command and Communication Vehicle =

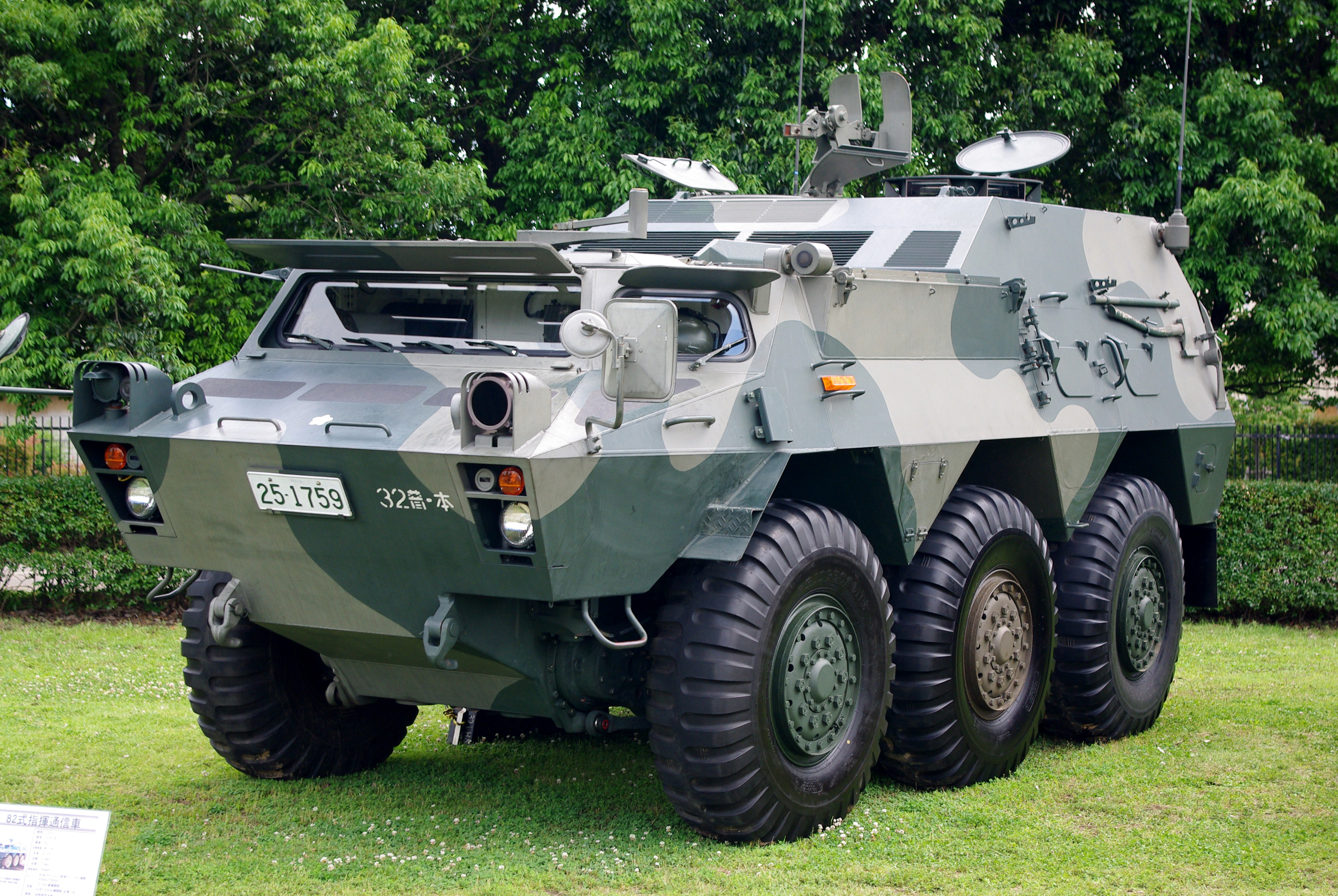
- A Type 82 Command and Communication Vehicle is displayed at an exhibition at Camp Ōmiya.
- Type: Armoured command vehicle
- Place of origin: Japan

Service history
- In service: 1982-Present
- Used by: Japan Ground Self-Defense Force

Production history
- Designer: Technical Research and Development Institute
- Designed: 1974–1982
- Manufacturer: Komatsu
- Developed into: Chemical Reconnaissance Vehicle, Type 87 Reconnaissance Combat Vehicle
- Unit cost: 58–100 million yen
- Produced: 1982–1999
- No. built: 231

Specifications
- Mass: 13.6 t (13.4 long tons; 15.0 short tons)
- Length: 5.72 m (18.8 ft)
- Width: 2.48 m (8 ft 2 in)
- Height: 2.38 m (7 ft 10 in)
- Crew: 8
- Main armament: 12.7 mm M2HB machine gun
- Secondary armament: 7.62 mm Type 62 machine gun (optional)
- Engine: Isuzu 10PB1 four-stroke V-configuration 10-cylinder water-cooled diesel engine 305 hp (227 kW) (2700 rpm)
- Power/weight: 22,43 hp/t
- Drive: six-wheel drive
- Transmission: six-speed manual
- Ground clearance: 0.45 m (1 ft 6 in)
- Operational range: 500 km (310 mi)
- Maximum speed: 100 km/h (62 mph)

The Type 82 Command and Communication Vehicle is the Japan Ground Self-Defence Force's first domestically produced wheeled armoured vehicle. It is primarily used as a mobile command post at division headquarters, infantry regimental headquarters, and artillery regimental headquarters. Produced by Komatsu in 1982–1999, the Type 82 was redesigned into the Chemical Reconnaissance Vehicle that entered service in 1987.

== Development ==
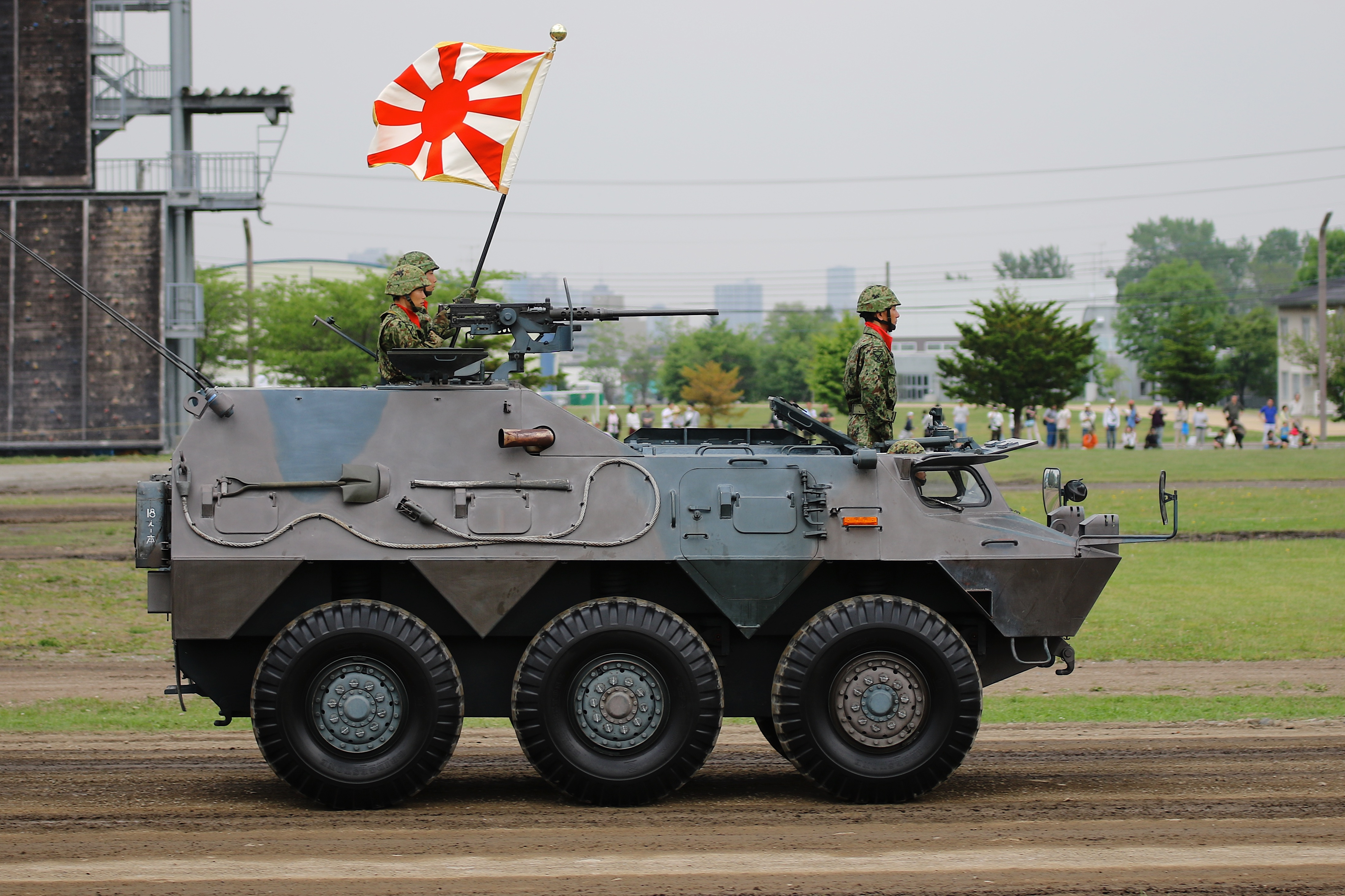
Raised rear roof makes working inside the Type 82 Command and Communication Vehicle easier.

Development of the Type 82 Command and Communication Vehicle began in 1974 when Komatsu with its four-wheel drive design competed against Mitsubishi Heavy Industries's six-wheel drive design for prototyping. Testing led Komatsu to also transition to a six-wheel drive configuration, mainly due to its higher payload capacity and greater crew size. Komatsu started building four prototypes in 1978.

The first prototype was finished in 1980. Following practical and technical trials, Komatsu's six-wheel drive design was officially adopted in 1982. Being a purpose-built design and not a modification of an existing armoured personnel carrier chassis makes the Type 82 rare among equivalent vehicles from other countries.

== Characteristics ==
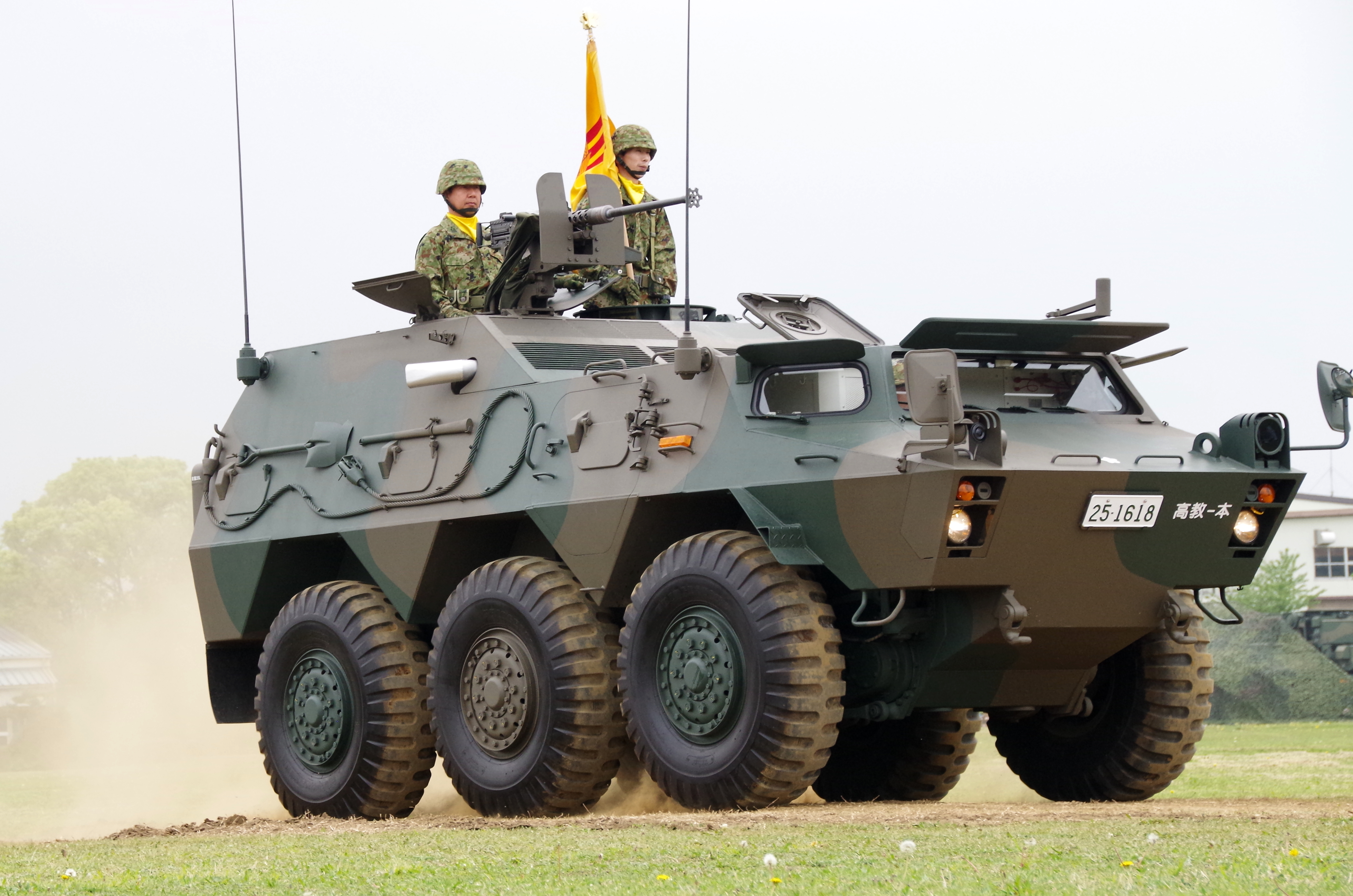
Multiple radio antennae characterise command and communication vehicles.

The Type 82 Command and Communication Vehicle's chassis is welded of rolled homogeneous armor that offers protection against bullets and artillery fragments. The driver's compartment has windows on its front and sides, which are equipped with upward-opening armoured shutters. Exiting the vehicle is possible via rear or side hatches. The rear section of the vehicle has a raised roof to facilitate working inside. The Type 82 is also amphibious.

An Isuzu 10PBI four-stroke liquid-cooled V-configuration 10-cylinder diesel engine – the first liquid-cooled engine used in a Japanese armoured vehicle – is in the centre section of the Type 82. The driver's compartment is in the front and the command and communication in the rear of the chassis. Moving from the front section to the rear and vice versa happens via a narrow aisle to the right of the engine. While most of the crew is seated in the command and communication compartment, there is a passenger seat on the left side of the driver's compartment.

Although engaging in direct combat is not a function of the Type 82 Command and Communication Vehicle, it has two machine guns for self-defence. A 12.7 mm M2 Browning machine gun is mounted with a gun shield on the roof of the rear section of the vehicle. A 7.62 mm Type 62 machine gun can be attached to the gun mount in front of the passenger's hatch on the front-left section of the roof of the vehicle.

== Operational history ==
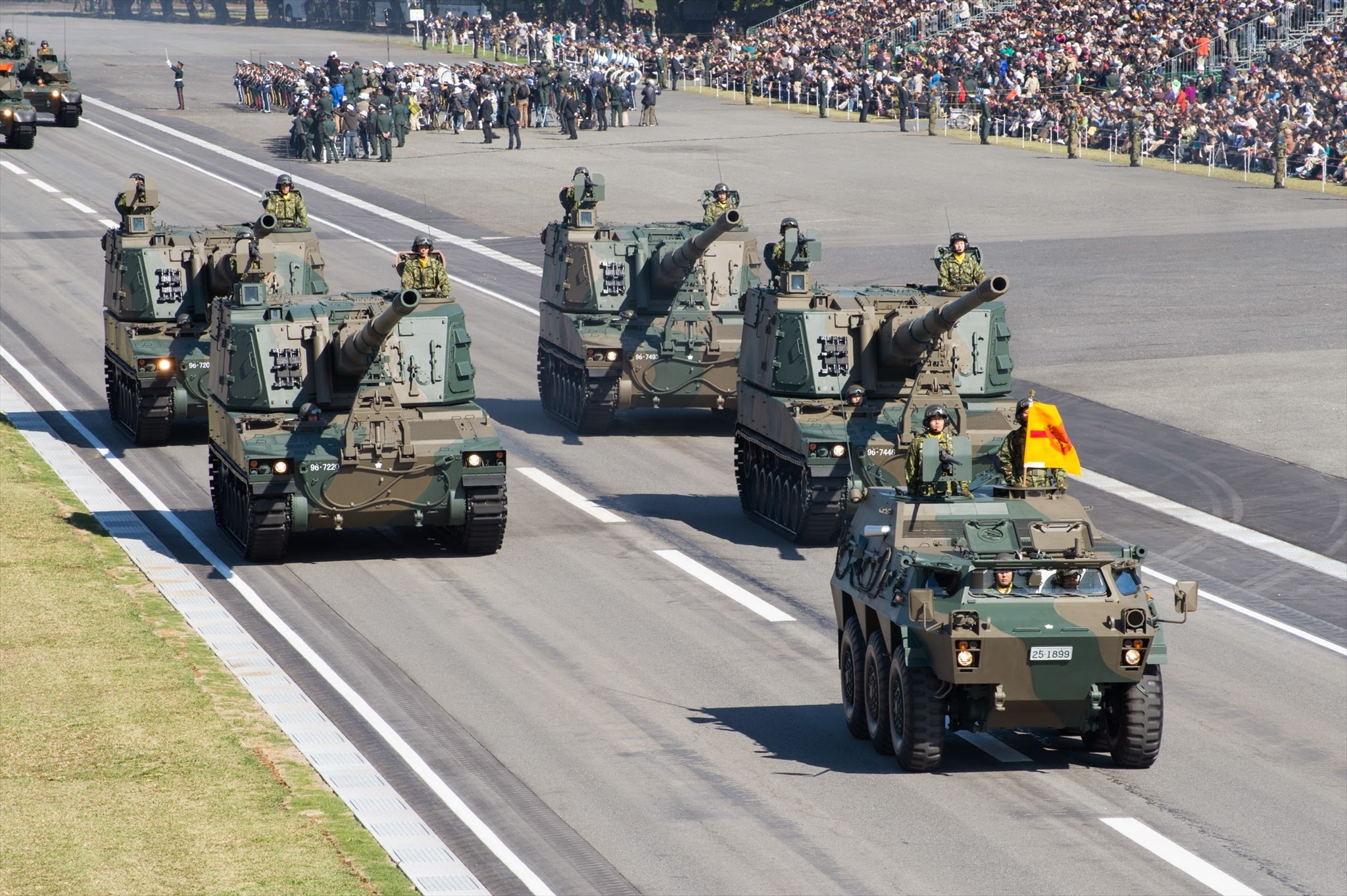
Type 82 Command and Communication Vehicles (front) also serve as mobile command posts for Type 99 155 mm self-propelled howitzer (rear) regiments.

The Type 82 Command and Communication vehicle was standardised in 1982 and procurement began in the same year. The Japan Ground Self-Defence Force's initial requirement was up to 250 vehicles, although the final procurement quantity was lower. Deliveries of vehicles started in 1982 and concluded in 1999 after 231 vehicles were produced. The vehicle remains in service by the mid-2020s, although it is due to be replaced. By 2022 it is unclear if the Type 82 could be replaced by Patria AMV XP that has been selected to replace the Type 96 armoured personnel carrier in service.

The Type 82 remains in use but the increased information flows of modern command and control underline the limitations of the vehicle. This is why existing equipment is often augmented by additional portable computers. Due to limitations pertaining to the command and control functions of the Type 82 Command and Communication vehicle, Type 10 main battle tank units often instead fit out Type 96 armoured personnel carriers with monitors, desks, and computers to act as command vehicles in lieu of the Type 82.
