= Type 87 RCV =

Type 87 Reconnaissance Combat Vehicle
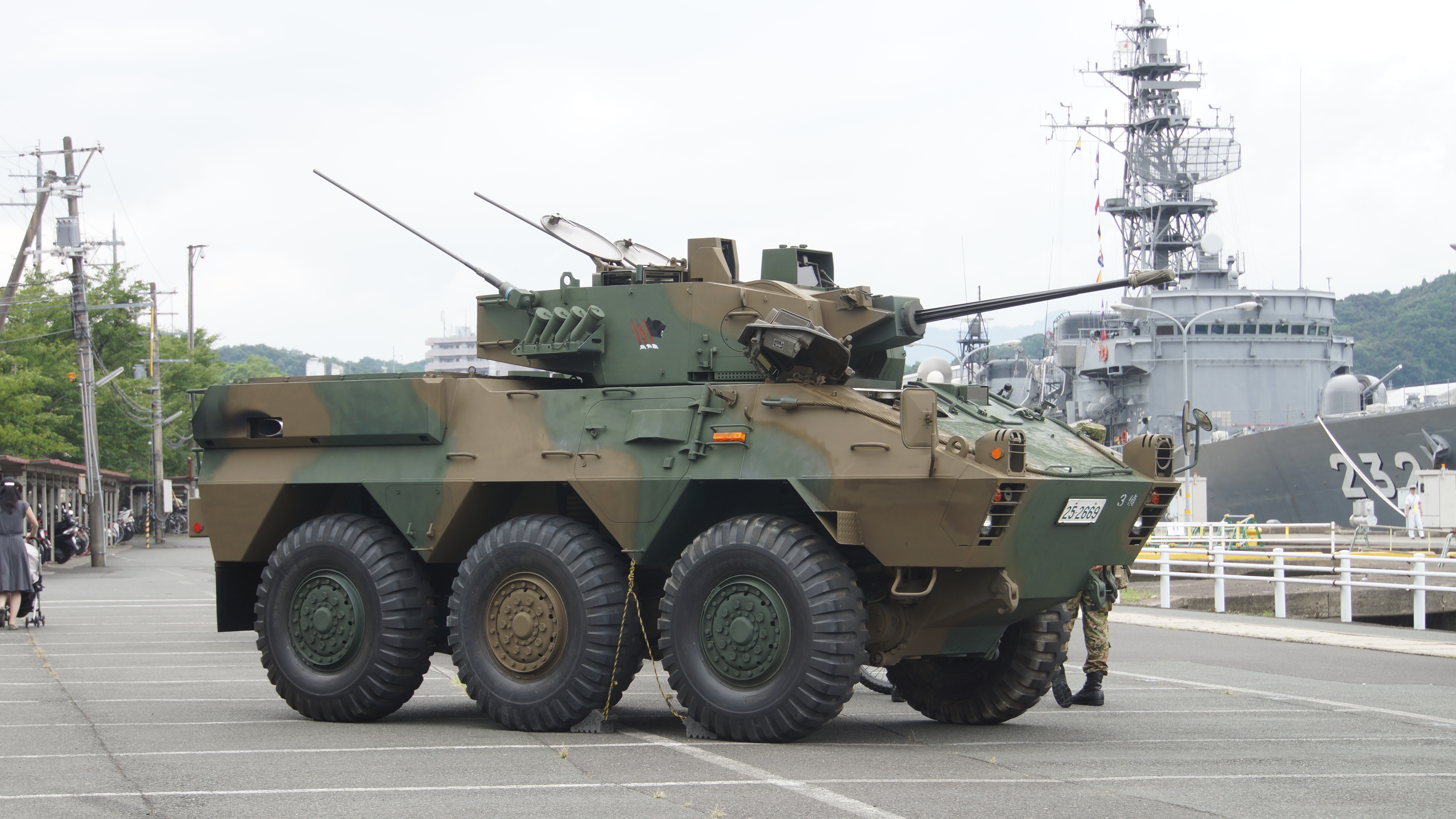
- A Type 87 Reconnaissance Combat Vehicle on display at the Maizuru Naval Base
- Type: Reconnaissance vehicle
- Place of origin: Japan

Service history
- In service: 1987-Present
- Used by: Japan Ground Self-Defense Force

Production history
- Designed: 1983–1987
- Manufacturer: Komatsu (chassis, turret), Japan Steel Works (gun)
- Developed from: Type 82 Command and Communication Vehicle
- Unit cost: 267 million yen (1995)
- Produced: 1987–2013
- No. built: 111

Specifications
- Mass: 15 t (15 long tons; 17 short tons)
- Length: 5.99 m (19.7 ft) (gun front)
- Width: 2.48 m (8 ft 2 in)
- Height: 2.80 m (9 ft 2 in)
- Crew: 5 (driver, radio operator, gunner, observer, commander)
- Shell: 25×137 mm
- Caliber: 25 mm
- Action: gas-operated
- Elevation: -10°…+45°
- Traverse: 360°
- Muzzle velocity: 1,335 m/s (4,380 ft/s) (APDS)
- Sights: optical
- Armor: rolled homogeneous armour
- Main armament: 25 mm Oerlikon KBA autocannon
- Secondary armament: 7.62 mm Type 74 machine gun
- Engine: Isuzu 10PBI 4-stroke V10 liquid-cooled diesel 305 hp (227 kW) (2,700 rpm)
- Power/weight: 20.3 hp/t (15.1 kW/t)
- Drive: 6×6
- Suspension: coil springs
- Ground clearance: 0.45 m (1 ft 6 in)
- Operational range: 500 km (310 mi)
- Maximum speed: 100 km/h (62 mph)

The Type 87 Reconnaissance Combat Vehicle, also known as the RCV or by its nickname Black Eye (ブラックアイ), is a six-wheel drive reconnaissance vehicle designed and manufactured by Komatsu. It was developed from the earlier Type 82 Command and Communication Vehicle. The Type 87 is employed exclusively by the Japan Ground Self-Defense Force. According to the United Nations Register of Conventional Arms, the last vehicle was procured in 2013.

== History ==
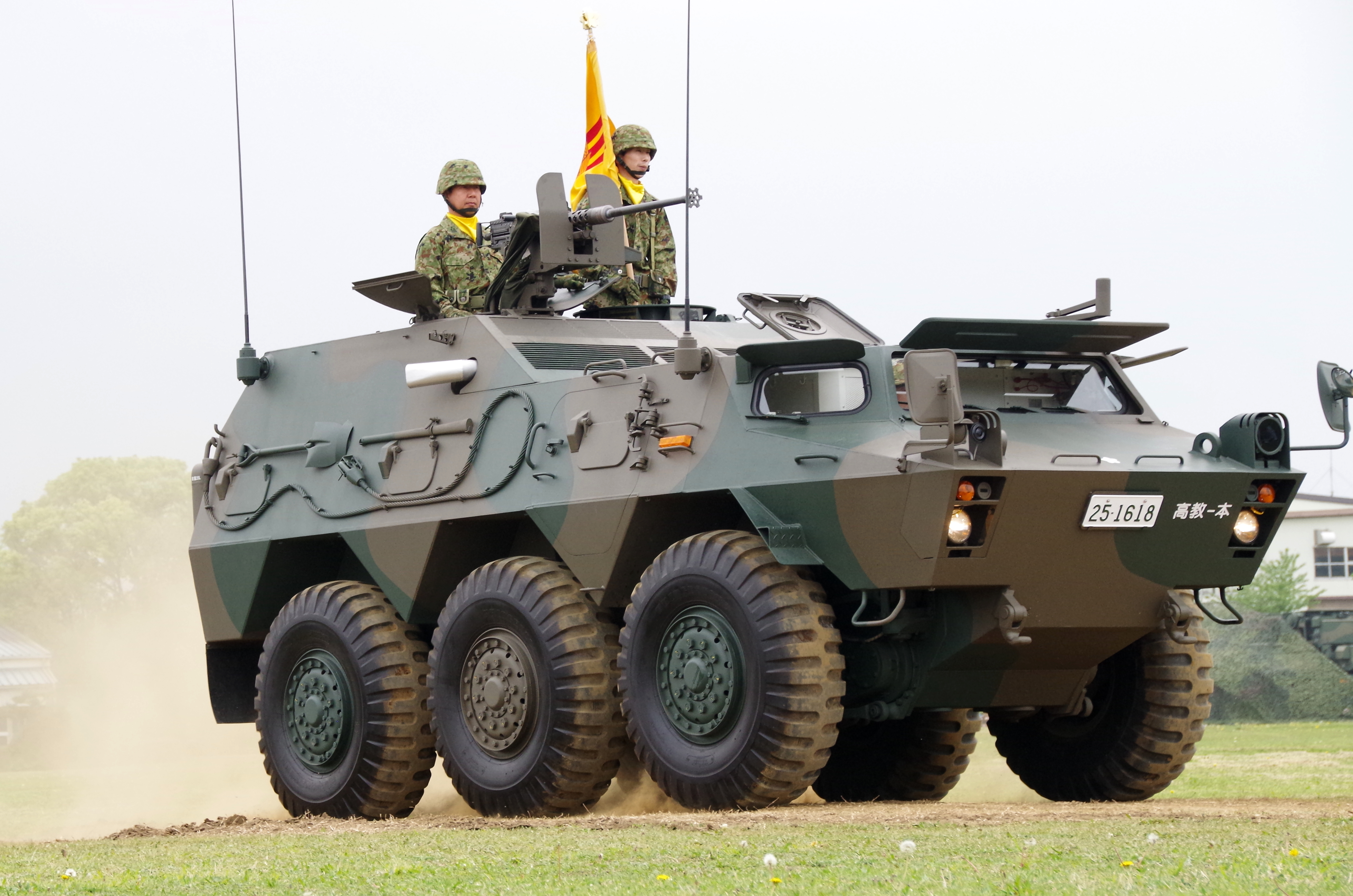
A Type 82 Command and Communication Vehicle, which the Type 87 Reconnaissance Combat Vehicle was developed from.

After World War II, the United States supplied the newly established Japan Ground Self-Defense Force with several variants of the M8 Greyhound armoured car. However, due to concerns about Japan's poor road conditions – many roads were unpaved and poorly maintained –, only a relatively small number were deployed for military service. By 1978, improvements in Japanese road infrastructure spurred the development of the first wheeled armoured vehicle produced by Japanese defence industry. The development concluded in 1982, when the Type 82 Command and Communication Vehicle entered the Japan Ground Self-Defense Force service.

The Type 87 Reconnaissance Combat Vehicle was developed by Komatsu, who also manufactured the earlier Type 82 command vehicle. Much of the chassis and powertrain is shared between the two vehicles, although the Type 87's front and top chassis have been modified to accommodate the turret. Production of two prototypes started in 1983, technical testing began in 1985, and the vehicle underwent operational testing in 1986. The Type 87 Reconnaissance Combat Vehicle was officially adopted by the Japan Ground Self-Defense Force in 1987.

Owing to its high cost and modest annual procurement numbers, production of the vehicle spanned decades. According to information provided to the United Nations Register of Conventional Arms, the final vehicle of the 111 Type 87s was procured in 2013. As of 2024, 110 vehicles remain in service in the Japan Ground Self-Defense Force.

== Features ==
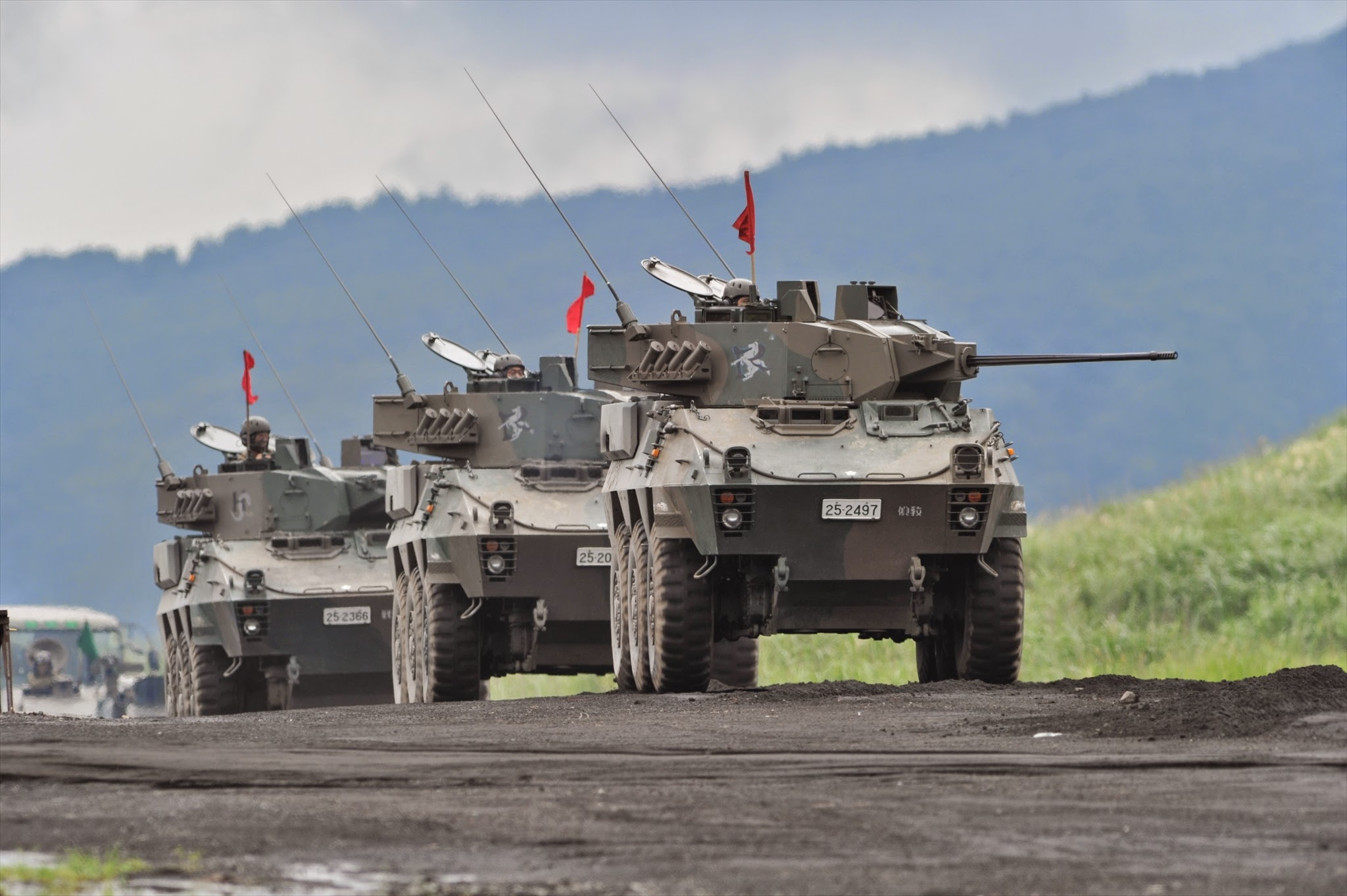
Type 87s during annual live fire exercises in the East Fuji Maneuver Area

The Type 87 Reconnaissance Combat Vehicle has a chassis welded from rolled homogeneous armour plates. The chassis shares many automotive components with the Type 82 Command and Communication Vehicle and includes power steering. The main entry and exit points of the vehicle are doors located on the right side between the first and second wheels and on the left side between the second and third wheels. Unlike the Type 82, the Type 87 is not amphibious and lacks NBC protection.

While the engine of the Type 82 is located in the middle section of the vehicle, the Type 87's Isuzu 10PBI four-stroke V10 liquid-cooled diesel engine has been moved to the right rear of the vehicle. The powered-traverse turret, where the commander (right) and gunner (left) are positioned, is mounted above the middle section of the vehicle. The driver is seated on the right front of the vehicle and an observer is seated to the left. The second observer or radio operator is positioned in the left rear section of the vehicle.

The primary armament of the Type 87 is a 25 mm Oerlikon KBA autocannon with a 80-calibre barrel, produced under license by Japan Steel Works. The vehicle also has a coaxial 7.62 mm Type 74 machine gun. Up to 400 rounds are carried for the main gun and 4,000 rounds for the machine gun. For self-defence, The Type 87 has one triple or quadruple smoke grenade launcher on both turret sides.

Comparison of similar platforms
	(Japan) Type 87	(Soviet Union) BRDM-2	(Spain) VEC-M1	(Germany) Spähpanzer Luchs
Portrait				
Length	5.99 m (19.7 ft)	5.75 m (18.9 ft)	6.10 m (20.0 ft)	7.74 m (25.4 ft)
Width	2.48 m (8 ft 2 in)	2.35 m (7 ft 9 in)	2.50 m (8 ft 2 in)	2.98 m (9 ft 9 in)
Height	2.80 m (9 ft 2 in)	2.31 m (7 ft 7 in)	2.50 m (8 ft 2 in)	2.84 m (9 ft 4 in)
Mass	15.0 t (14.8 long tons; 16.5 short tons)	7.0 t (6.9 long tons; 7.7 short tons)	13.7 t (13.5 long tons; 15.1 short tons)	19.5 t (19.2 long tons; 21.5 short tons)
Top speed	100 km/h (62 mph)	100 km/h (62 mph)	90 km/h (56 mph)	90 km/h (56 mph)
Amphibious	No	Yes	Yes	Yes
Crew	5	4	5	4
Armament	25 mm Oerlikon KBA autocannon, 7.62 mm Type 74 machine gun	14.5 mm KPV heavy machine gun, 7.62 mm PKT machine gun	25 mm M242 Bushmaster autocannon, 7.62 mm MG3 machine gun	20 mm Rheinmetall Mk 20 autocannon, 7.62 mm MG3 machine gun

== Gallery ==
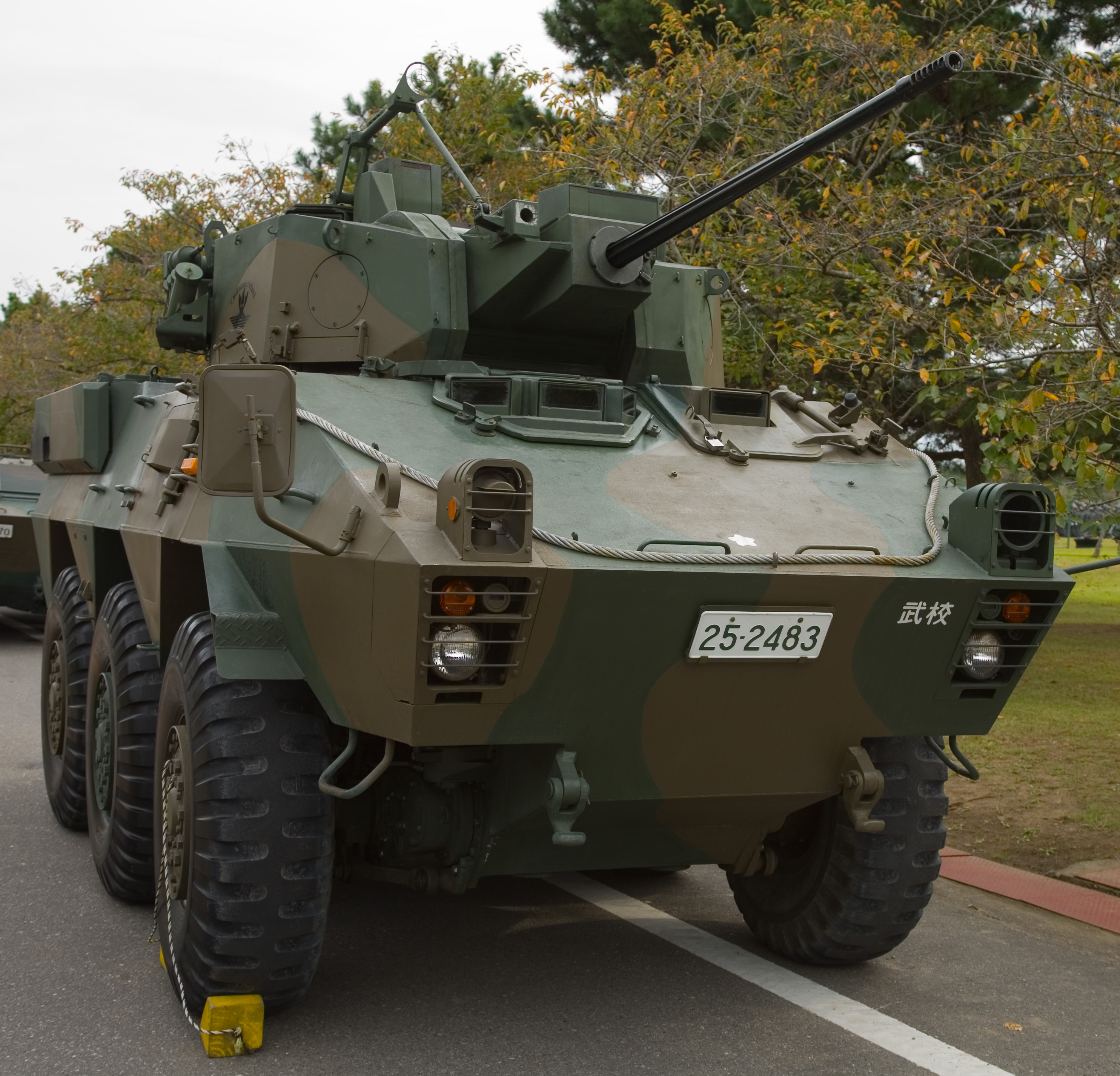
Right front view of the Type 87

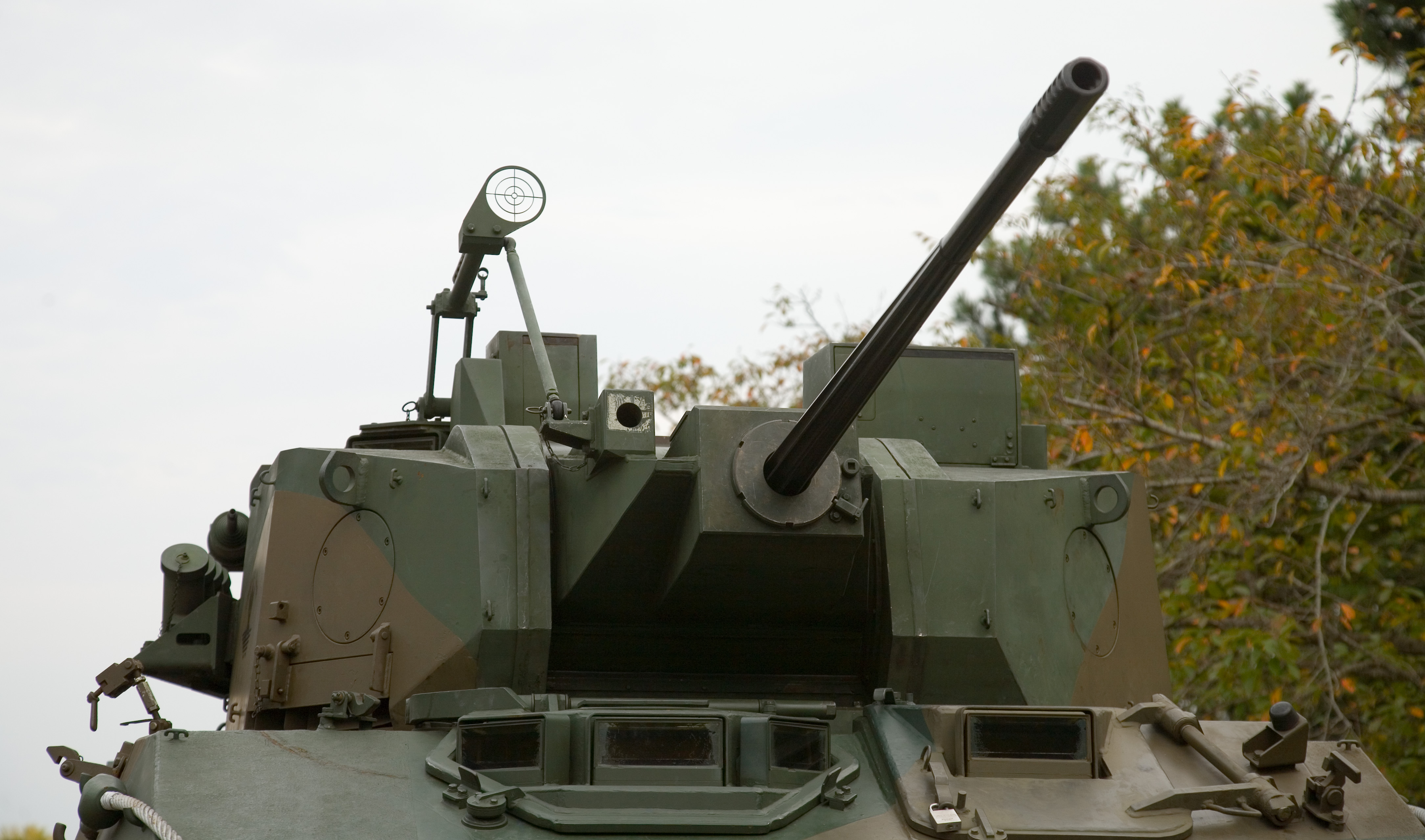
A close-up view of the turret and the 25 mm Oerlikon KBA autocannon

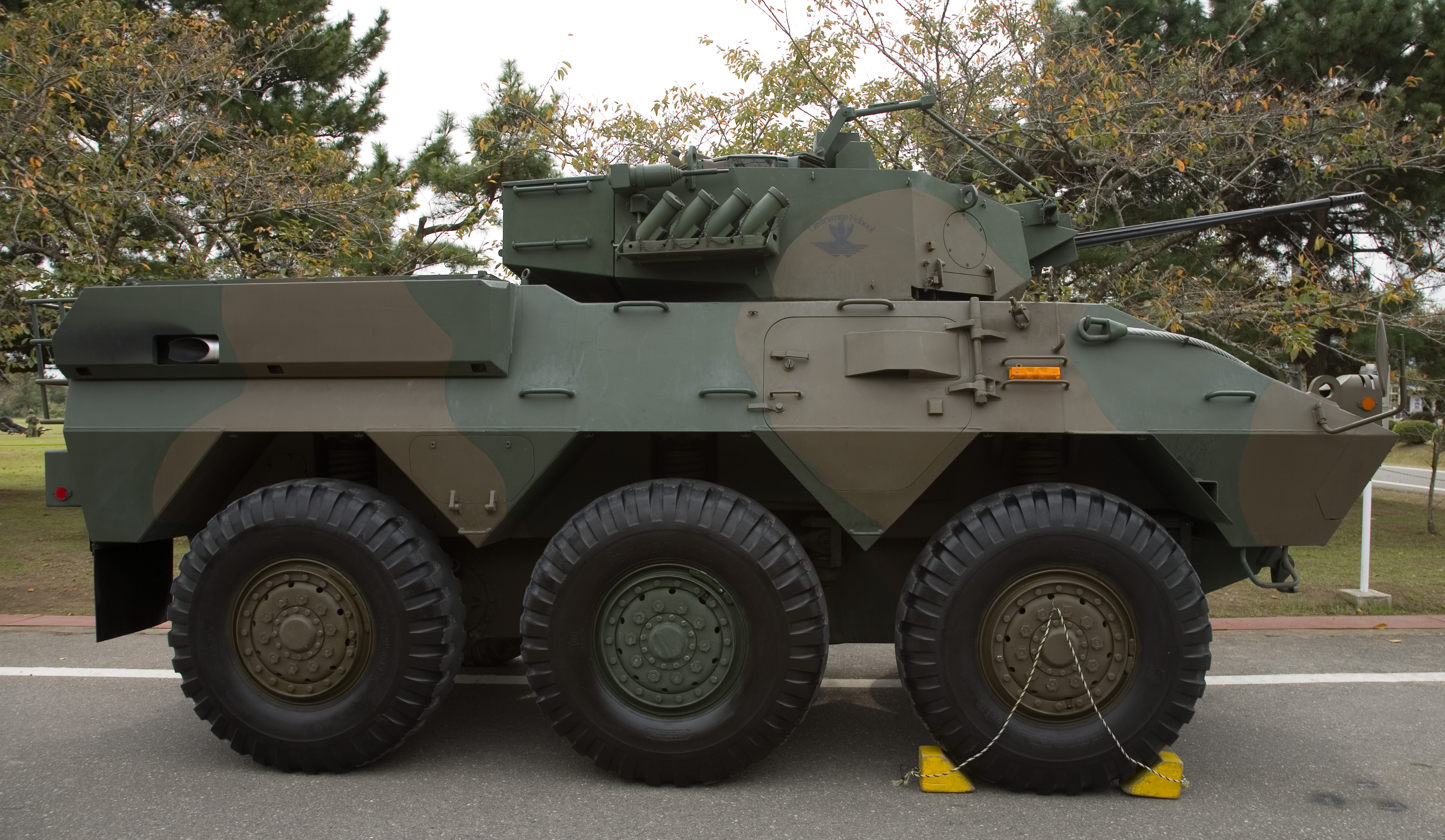
Right side view of the Type 87

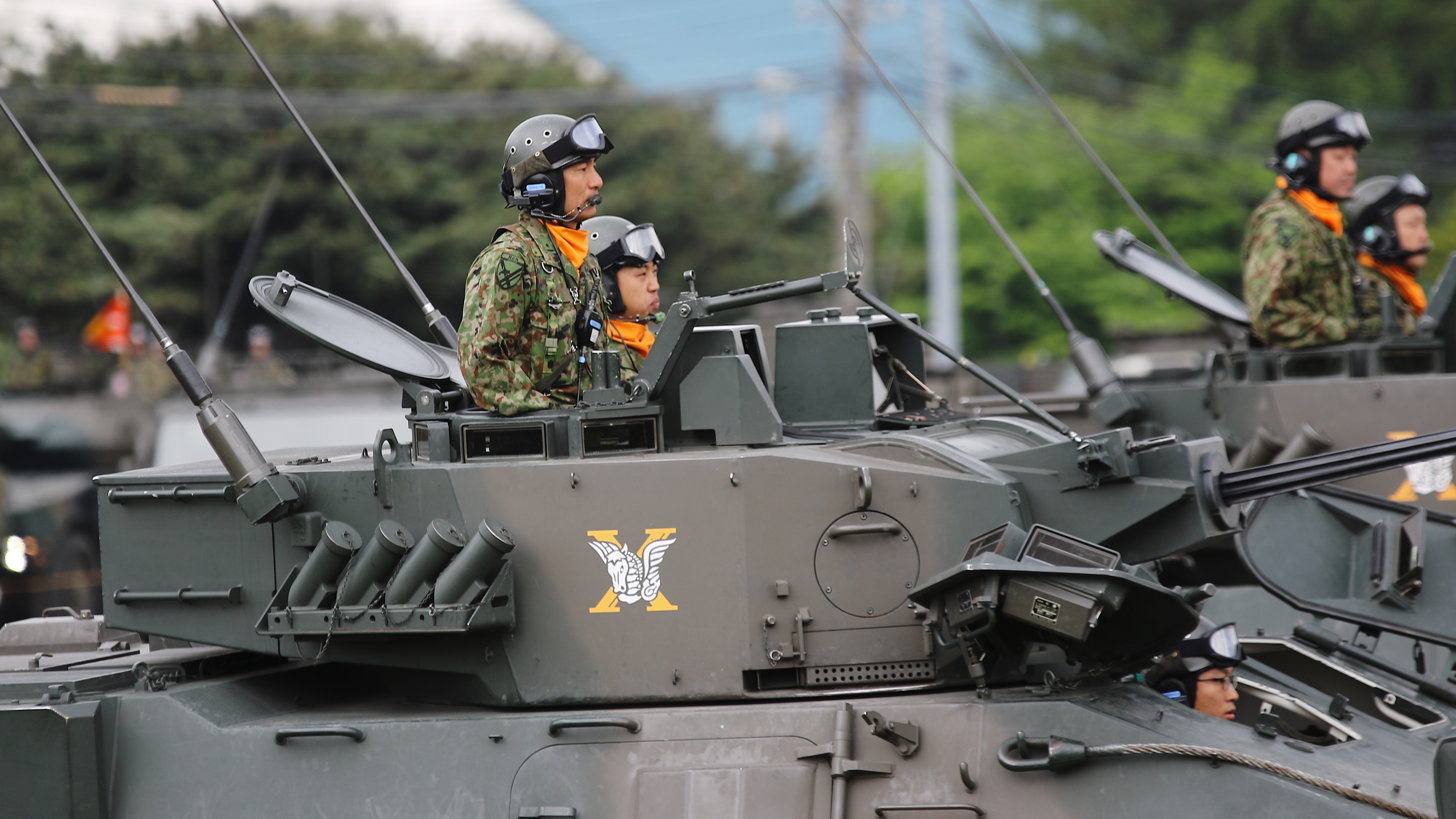
A close-up view of the turret and the smoke grenade launchers

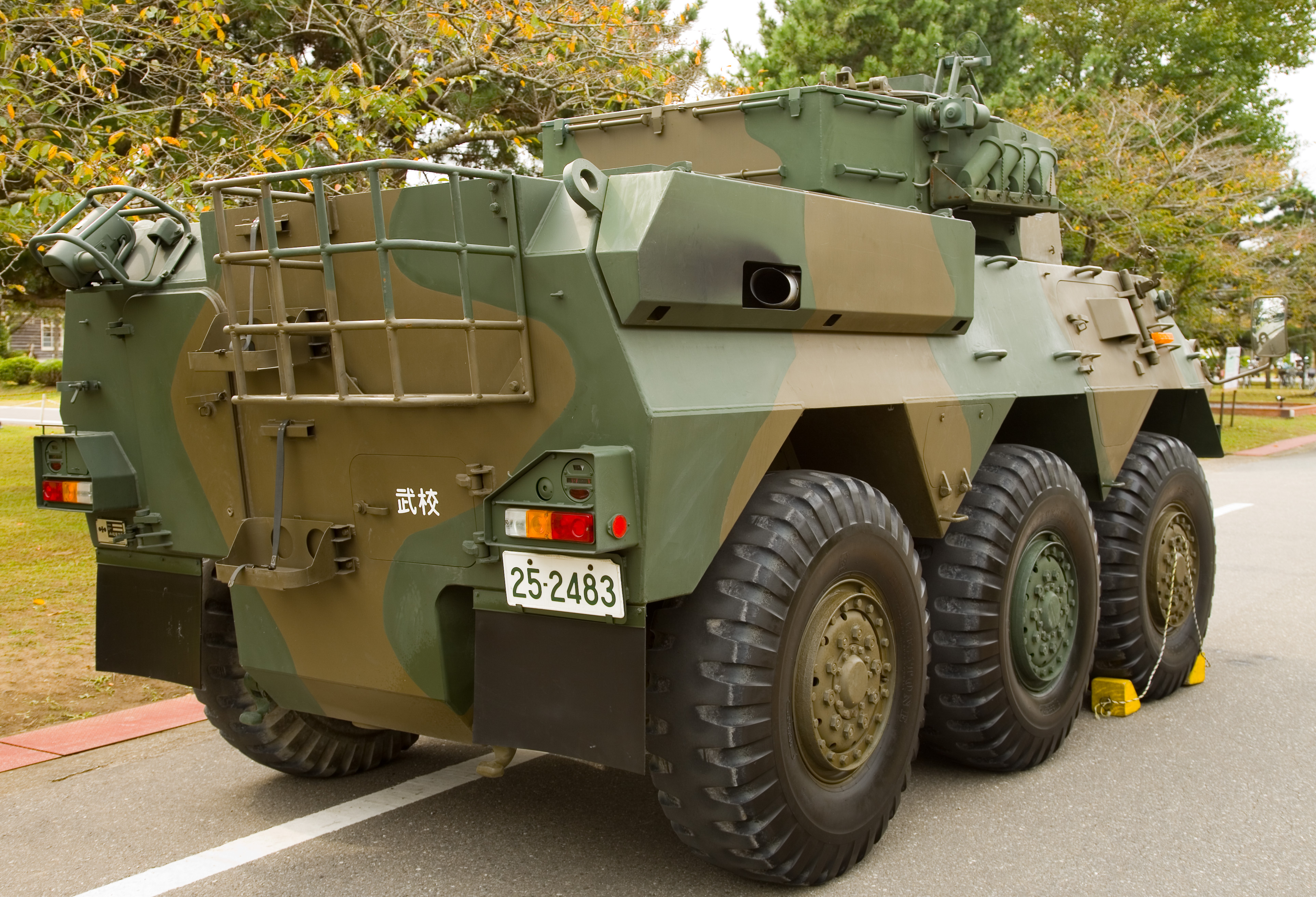
Right rear view of the Type 87

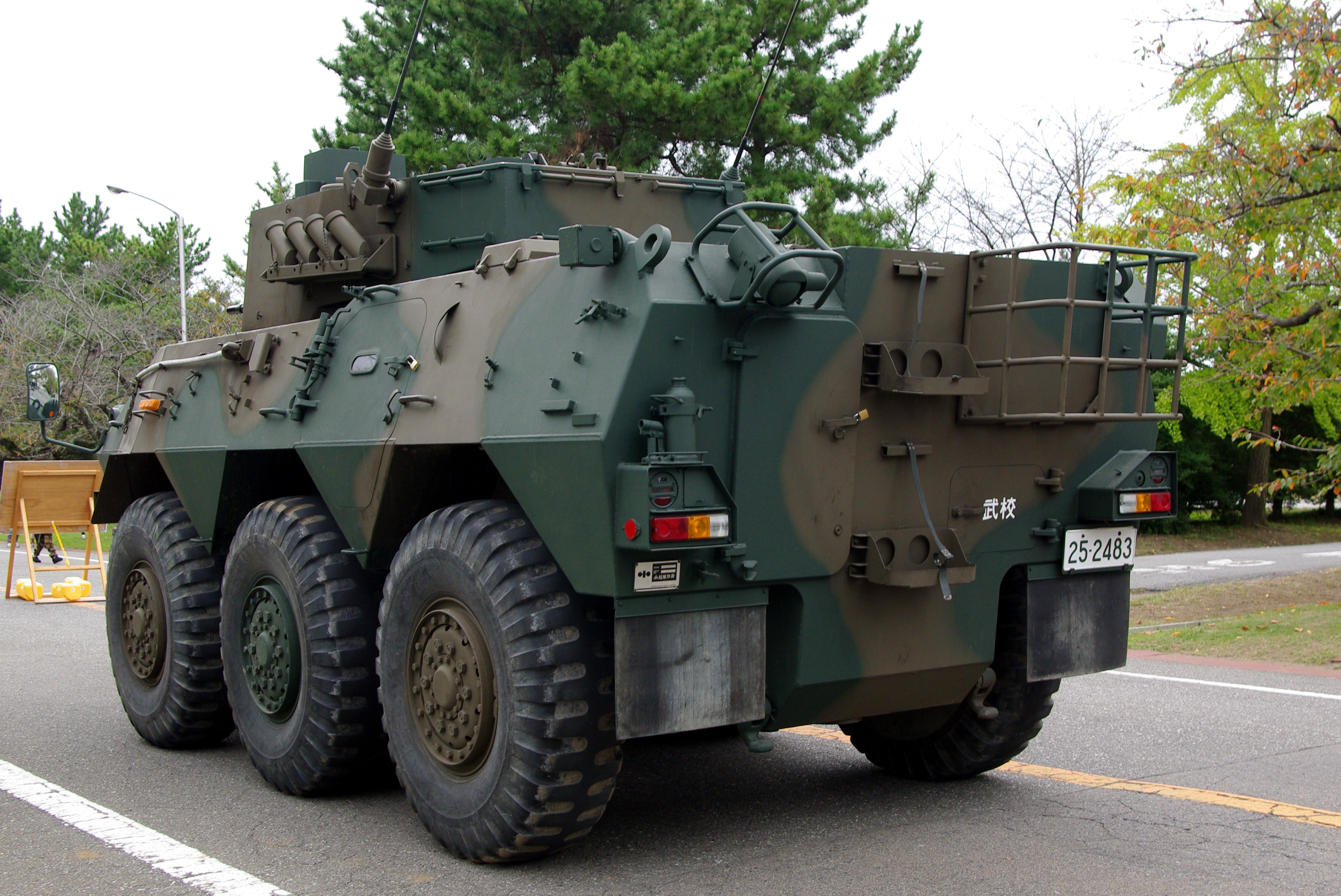
Left rear view of the Type 87

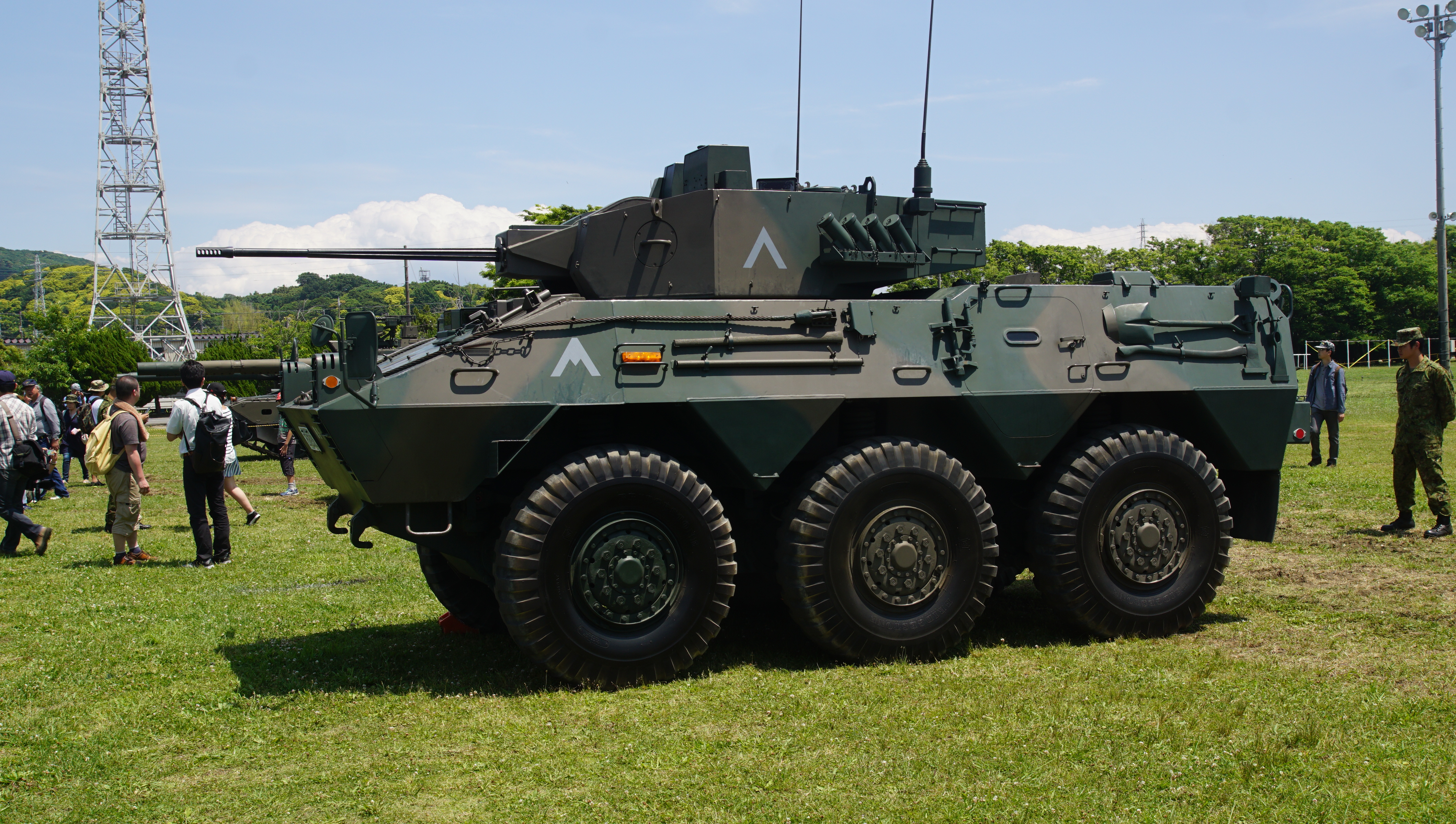
Left side view of the Type 87

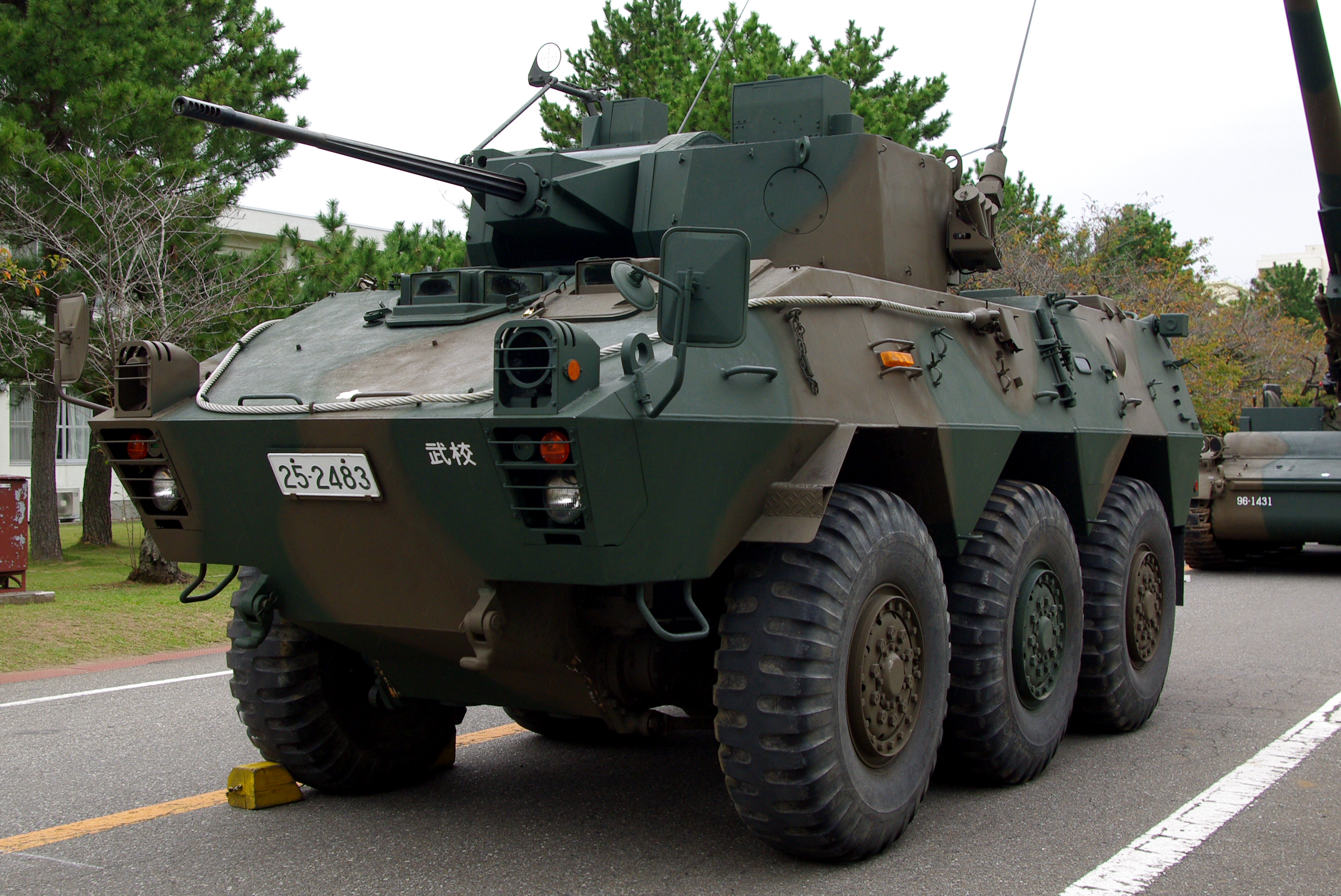
Left front view of the Type 87

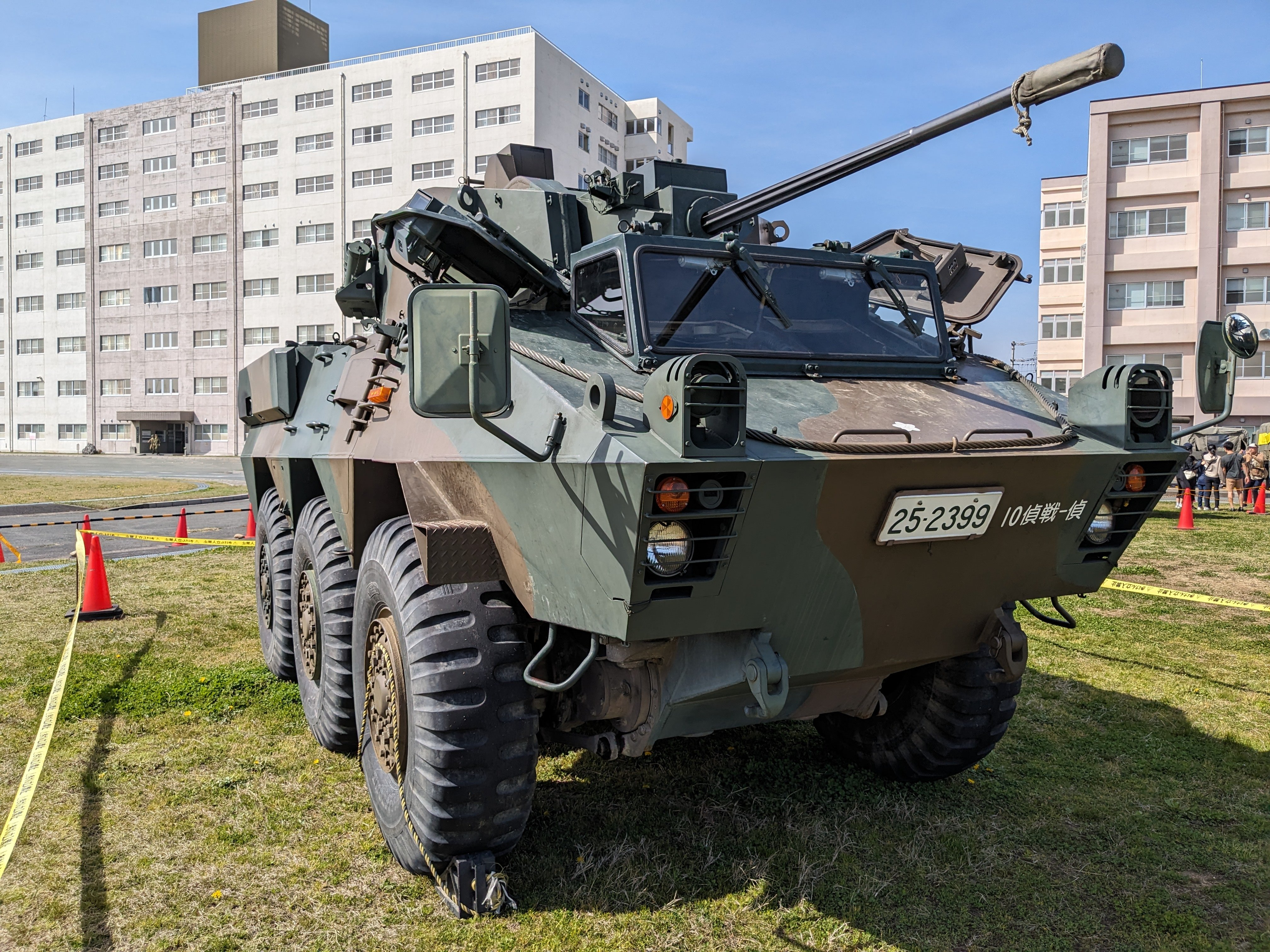
A Type 87 with its windscreen attached
