= DSS-161 =

- Type: Hand grenade
- Place of origin: People's Republic of China

Service history
- In service: 2016 - present

Production history
- Produced: 2016 - present

The DSS-161 is a hand grenade family produced by the People's Republic of China.

== Design ==
The DSS-161 uses the conventional cylinder layout and employs a special design which allows discreet and safe user operation with one hand.

The DSS-161 has a "stackable" configuration that allows the user to connect grenades for increased firepower which is similar to the American Scalable Offensive Hand Grenade design.

== Variants ==
=== DSY-151 ===
Thermobaric variant

=== DSB-151 ===
Flash and stun variant

=== DRH-181/183 ===
Stun variant

=== DSR-161 ===
Incendiary variant

=== DSF-161 ===
Smoke variant

== Adoption ==
The DSS-161 is one of the standard hand grenades of the People’s Liberation Army alongside the Type 77, Type 82 and Type 86.

== Users ==
- China

== See also ==
- Type 67 hand grenade – (China)
- Type 77 hand grenade – (China)
- Type 82 hand grenade – (China)
- Type 86 hand grenade – (China)
