= Sumitomo Type 62 =

Sumitomo NTK-62
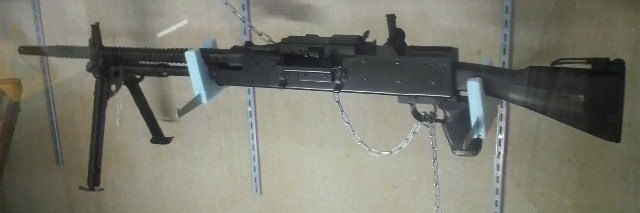
- Type 62 Machine Gun on display
- Type: General purpose machine gun
- Place of origin: Japan

Service history
- In service: February 15, 1962–present
- Used by: Japan
- Wars: Cold War; Iraq War

Production history
- Designer: Masaya Kawamura
- Designed: 1954
- Manufacturer: Sumitomo Heavy Industries
- Unit cost: ¥2,000,000 (c. 1985)
- Produced: 1962–present
- Variants: See Variants

Specifications
- Mass: 10.15 kg (22.38 lb)
- Length: 1,200 mm (47.2 in)
- Barrel length: 546 mm (21.5 in)
- Cartridge: 7.62×51mm NATO
- Action: Gas-operated
- Rate of fire: 650 RPM
- Maximum firing range: 1,000 m 1,500 m (with bipod)
- Feed system: Belt-fed
- Sights: Iron sights

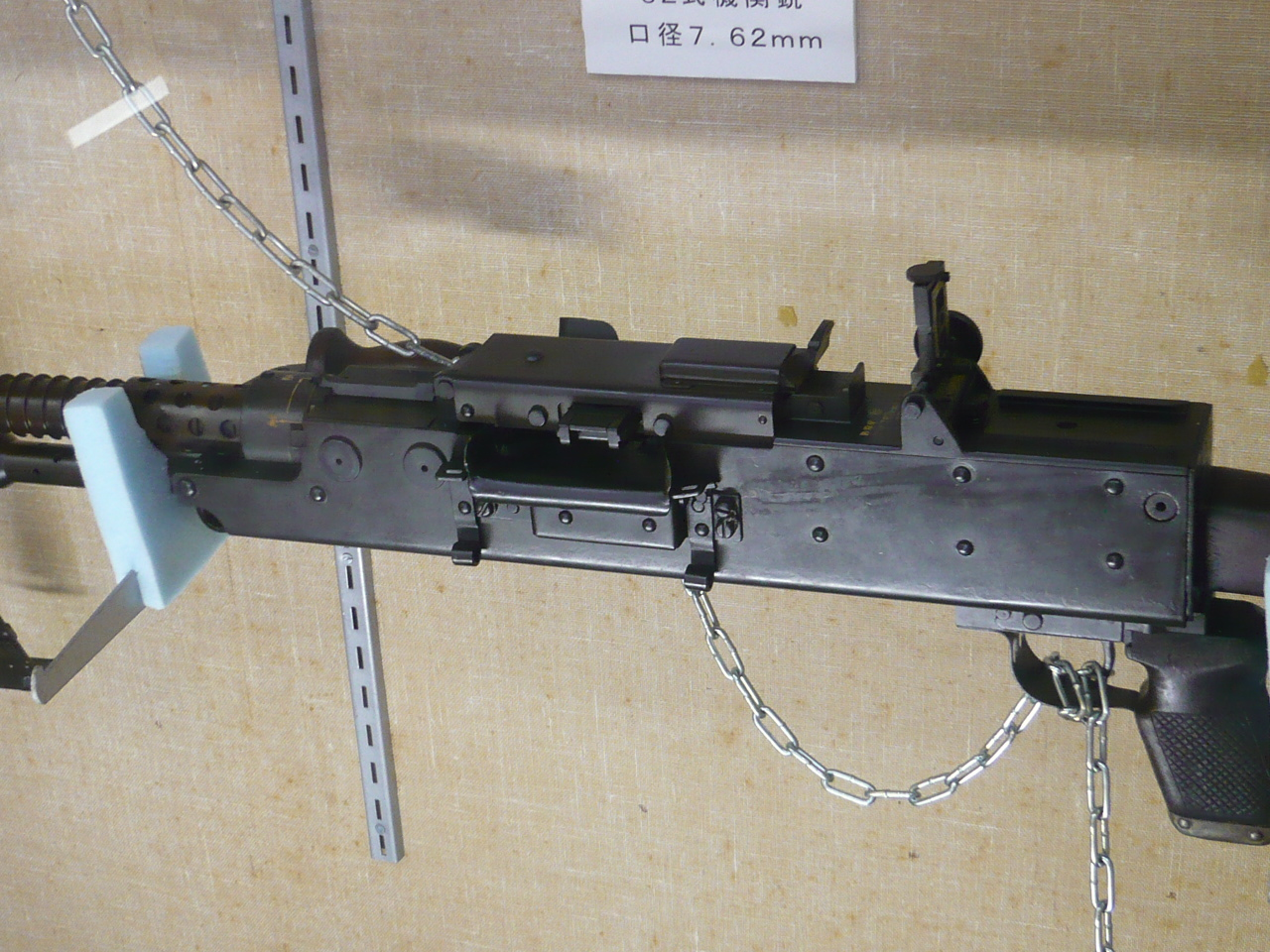
Closeup of the NTK-62's receiver

The Sumitomo NTK-62 (62式7.62mm機関銃, Rokuni-shiki Nana-ten-rokuni-miri Kikanjū) is the standard issue general-purpose machine gun of the Japan Self-Defense Forces. It's also known as the Type 62 7.62mm Machine Gun or the Type 62 GPMG.

When first issued, it fulfilled both light and medium machine gun support throughout the JGSDF. Though the Sumitomo Heavy Industries' M249 firing the smaller 5.56×45mm NATO cartridge has largely replaced it in the light machine gun role at the squad level in the JGSDF, the Type 62 still plays the support role at platoon and company level for the infantry as a medium machine gun firing the more powerful 7.62×51mm NATO cartridge. It also continues to be used as a co-axial weapon in various armored vehicles, including tanks and APCs.

Like all modern Japanese-made firearms, it was never exported.

== History ==
After years of using the Browning M1919A4 as its standard GPMG during the early days of founding the Japan Self-Defense Forces, NTK-62 GPMG was designed at Nittoku Metal Industry (NTK) in order to market it as the M1919's successor. The GPMG was made to meet the requirements of the Japanese Defense Agency.

The designation "62" was present due to the fact that first batches of the NTK-62 were made in 1962 after development started in 1954. It was specifically adopted on February 15, 1962, effectively replacing the M1919 Browning machine gun in JGSDF service.

In 2013, SHI was involved in a scandal where NTK-62 test data was falsified on purpose for 5,350 machine guns produced from 1974.

== Development ==
After the war, the decision to develop a new machine gun to replace the M1919A4/A6 and M1918A2 automatic rifles provided by the US Army was made by the Land Staff Equipment Committee in 1954. Based on the war lessons of the Japanese Army during the Battle of Okinawa, the exploits of the Japanese light machine gun in the Battle of Kamata and other battles were used as a reference during development.

The developer was Dr Masaya Kawamura (also Masaya) (1906-1994), a doctor of engineering at Nittoku who was involved in the pre-war prototypes of the Type Hei Rifle and Trial Ultra Light Machine Gun, which challenged military adoption with their original structures but were never adopted, and in the development of the Type 5 30 mm fixed machine gun during the war, and after the war also made achievements in the development of the bulldozer. 1994).

The first prototype was completed in October 1956. The appearance of the prototype at that time was very similar to the Type 99 light machine gun, with a flash hider and a forward-facing carrying handle like the Type 99 LMG, and was like a Type 99 modified to belt-feed 30-06 (7.62x63 mm round) specifications. Afterwards, it was changed to 7.62x51mm NATO ammunition specifications (7.62x51mm round), and several prototypes were made, including the NITTOKU Type 14 in 1958 and Type 15 in 1960, and after various tests, it was provisionally adopted as the Type 62 7.62mm machine gun in 1962.

== Design ==
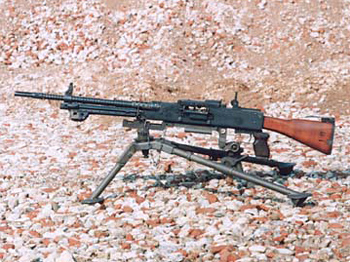
Mounted on a tripod mount

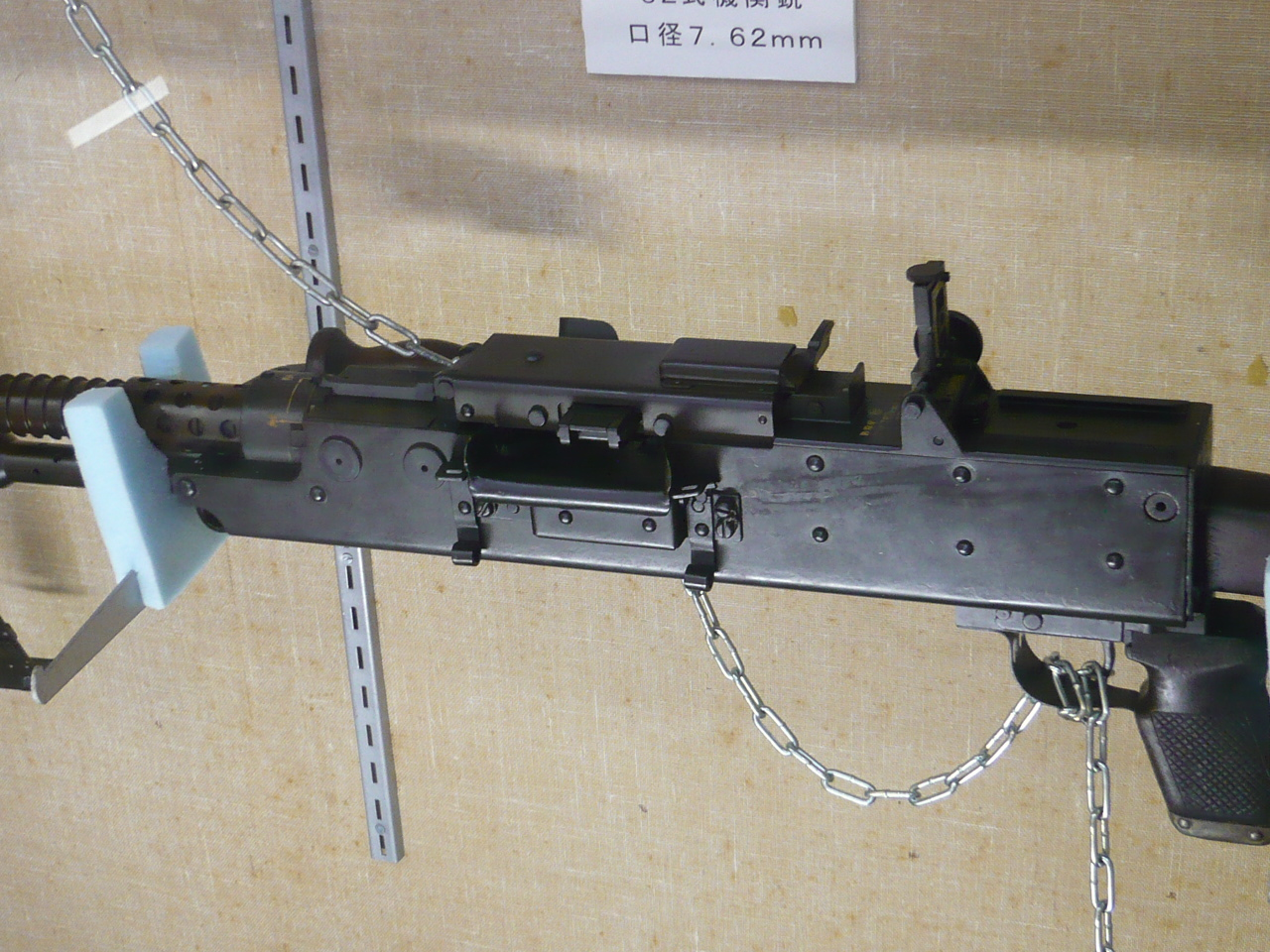
Close-up of the playground bottom cover and the tail tube

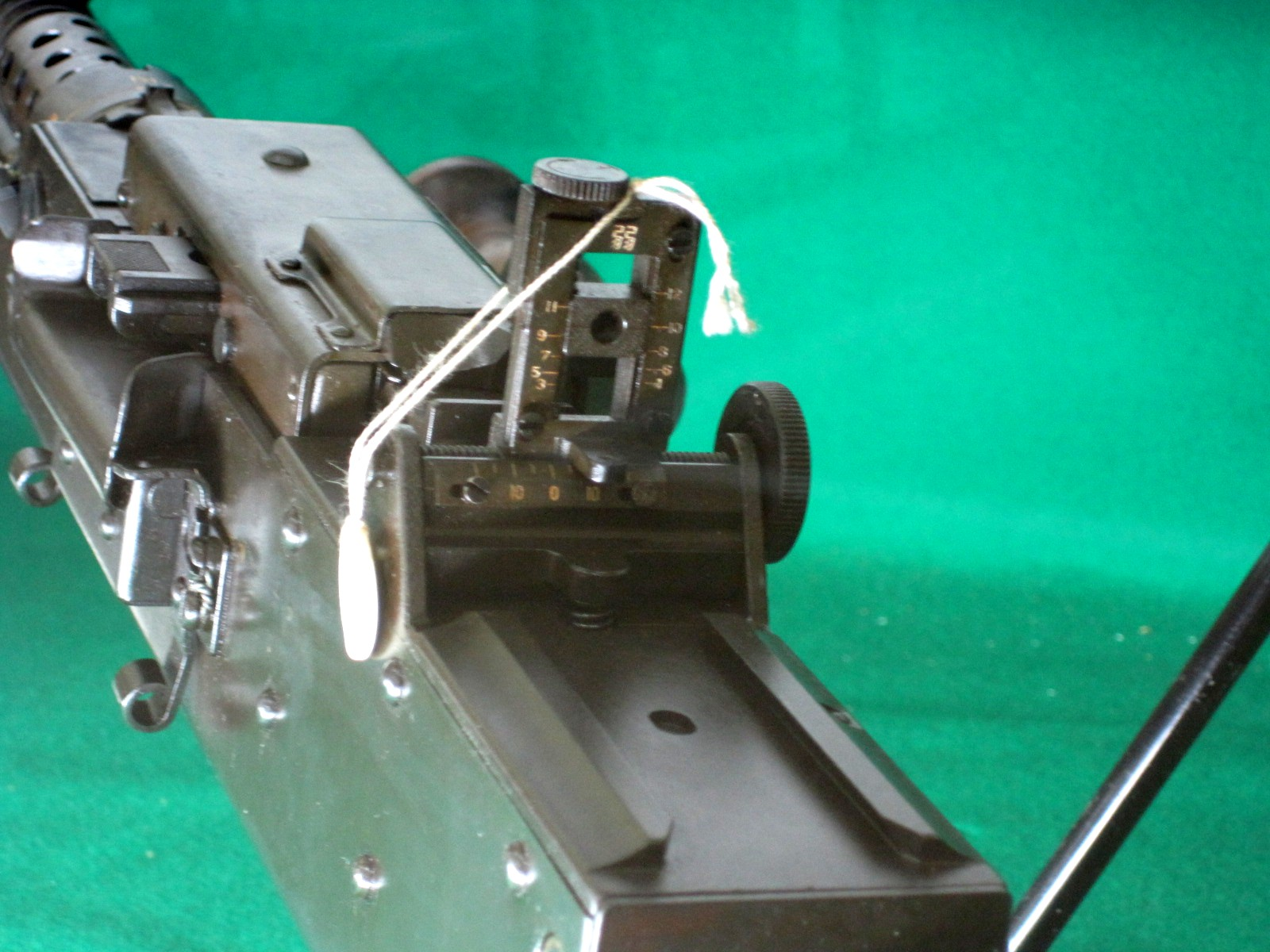
sight

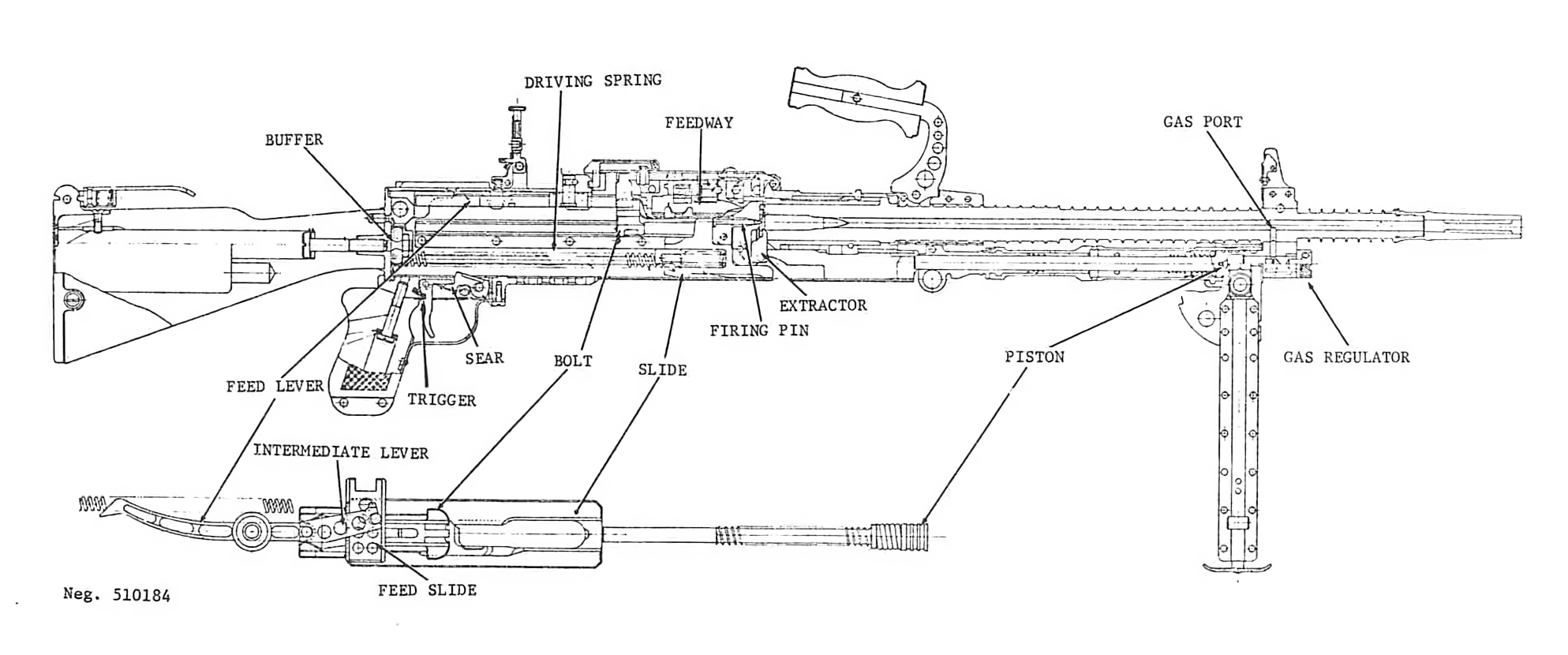
full designs of Type 62

The Sumitomo NTK-62 is a gas operated machine gun chambered in the 7.62×51mm NATO cartridge, belt fed with the use of M13 disintegrating links. Pressed metal was used in parts of the machine gun during manufacturing in order to reduce overall weight. While normal 7.62 NATO ammo is used, a version with reduced powder charge is also used.

It has an unusual feed tray as the pivoting lever is above the bolt in the receiver, rather than in the feed tray cover found on most machine guns.

The design was done based on physique of the Japanese person who would be expected to handle the machine gun.

The procurement price per gun was approximately 2 million yen (in 1985). It boasted high productivity for its time due to the extensive use of press work.

The barrel is integrated with the pommel (carrying handle) and can be changed in 2.5 seconds, the lumen is chrome-plated to increase durability, and there are cooling fins on the periphery to reduce overheating of the barrel. Like the Type 64 7.62 mm rifle, the design also took into account the Japanese physique. These are said to be advantages over the M60 machine gun in operation in the US Army at the time.

Also, because the parts are completely interchangeable, 100 Type 62s can be disassembled and reassembled, and another 100 can be reassembled.

The actuation system is gas-pressure-operated (long-stroke piston), and the firing rate can be changed by adjusting the gas flow rate with a regulator.

The bolt closure mechanism is a special mechanism called the 'front-end pivoting tilting bolt closure mechanism', which is a type of tilt bolt mechanism. The bolt is closed when the front end of the bolt rises and the protrusion on the side of the bolt engages the depression on the inside side of the receiver, and the bolt is opened when the front end of the bolt is lowered by a cam on the rod as the operating rod (gas piston) retracts.

The receiver was manufactured by press-forming a steel sheet to reduce weight. It is box-shaped, rectangular in cross-section and assembled with rivets.

The ammunition used is 7.62x51 mm NATO rounds. Normally, a reduced projectile load is used, but conventional ammunition may also be used. It is fed by a US military or NATO-approved metal detachable M13 link.

The safety is located at the top of the right-hand side of the trigger, with the safety facing forward and the firing position by turning the safety halfway to the grip side. The bottom cover is opened by pushing the bottom cover latch towards the muzzle, but bullets can be loaded without opening the cover.

The telescopic part has a left-right tangent wheel on the right side, which can be turned to move the telescopic part left or right, and turning the vertical tangent wheel on the upper left side of the telescopic part raises or lowers the target, which has a hole in the middle of the distance scale plate.

It is equipped with a bipod as standard equipment and can be operated as a light machine gun by using a bipod and as a heavy machine gun by using a tripod. In addition, it can be over-fired from a distance by attaching direct aiming glasses (scope).

The firing posture includes 'prone firing', which is similar to the case of Type 64 and Type 89 rifles with bipods. Assault firing postures include 'hip shot' and 'crouch shot'. There were also 'shoulder fire' and 'crouched fire', but these were very taxing on the shooter, as the weight and recoil had to be supported solely by arm strength.

== Review ==
The Type 62 is said to have problems such as the high number of parts, which makes disassembly and assembly time-consuming, and the occurrence of spontaneous firing due to poor design of the fire control group. Difficult maintenance due to the high number of parts (a trait shared with the Type 64 7.62mm rifle), components falling off due to loose tolerances, barrels pulling out of receivers when lifted by the carrying handle at an angle, poor accuracy in sustained fire, malfunctions, negligent discharges, and runaways have led to derogatory nicknames including 'the gun that does not listen' (62式（ろくに）言うこと聞かん銃), 'Type 62 single-shot machine gun' (62式単発機関銃), 'King of Stupid Guns' (キング・オブ・バカ銃), 'The Better Without machine gun' (無い方がマシンガン), and 'Squad suicide firearm' (分隊自滅火器) being given to it by the troops who operated it.

In his book 'The Phantom Machine Gun', Mitsuo Tsunose, one of the developers of the Type 64 rifle, states that despite the Type 62 being a machine gun capable of sustained continuous fire, the barrel's outer diameter is smaller than that of the Type 64 rifle (28mm compared to 34 mm barrel) in addition to a weaker structure. This slender barrel is said to be the root cause of the Type 62 machine gun's deficiencies: the barrel weight of the Type 62 machine gun is said to be approximately 2 kg (97.6 g per inch) with a barrel length of approximately 20.5 inches, compared to the FN MAG, another 7.62 mm general purpose machine gun of the same period (24.8 inches, 3 kg, 121 .0 g) and the M60 machine gun (22 inches, 4.17 kg, 189.5 g per inch). The M60 was lightened to 2.18 kg (99.1 g per inch) with a 22-inch barrel in the M60E3 in the 1980s, but this was later reduced to 2.68 kg (121.8 g per inch), as it was considered dangerous to fire more than 200 rounds continuously as this would cause the barrel to overheat.

In a document by Shinkichi Ito, who like Tsunose was one of the developers of the Type 64 rifle, the rear chamber of the barrel of the Type 62 machine gun is described as having a lumen pressure of 50,000 lb/sq in, the same as the Type 64 rifle, but with a wall thickness of 8.6 mm. This figure is 3.5 mm thinner than the Type 64 rifle in the documents, and the same thickness as the French M1890 Label rifle. In 'Safety of guns (No. 4)' in the above document, Ito does not directly express a negative view of the Type 62 machine gun, but points out that 'the Lebel and Nagant (7.0 mm wall thickness) have thin chambers, but the casings taper strongly and the lumen pressure is low' and that the advantage of a thick chamber is the 'lower temperature rise when firing a large number of rounds in rapid succession and low risk of self-destruction of the actual shells', 'the shells do not stick to the chamber, so the spent shell can be extracted lightly' and 'greater strength and safety against rupture'.

In the development process of the Type 62 machine gun, in order to solve the problem of casings sticking to the chamber due to overheating caused by the slender barrel, an attempt was made to increase the extraction force of the casings by moving a large loose bottom back and forth at high speed under strong gas pressure, but this resulted in a decline in accuracy, and this time the casings could not withstand the strong extraction force and shredded. In addition, the shells could not withstand the strong pulling force and broke into pieces. In response, a part called a swing bottom was added to the bottom of the bottom of the gun and the casings were gradually pulled out while swinging back and forth, thereby ensuring stable pulling force even at low gas pressure in consideration of accuracy. This is the structure known as the front-end oscillating tilting bolt closing mechanism, which is a major feature of the Type 62 machine gun, but it is a complex structure with no precedent in the world, and later became a factor in the high incidence of malfunctions. In the field, Type 62 machine guns carry lubricants such as KURE 5-56, which is sprayed on the shell casings and engine parts, to counter the problem of sticking shell casings.

Another drawback was that the retraction extension of the breech bottom was too long, and if the breech bottom failed to reach the breech hook due to insufficient gas pressure or other factors during continuous firing, a fatal problem could occur in which continuous firing would continue even if the trigger was not being pulled.

As mentioned above, Toyowa Industry, to which Tsunose, Ito and others belonged, had learned in the process of developing the Type 64 rifle that a barrel outer diameter of at least 34 mm was suitable, and as the reason for the difficulties in developing the Type 62 machine gun was that the barrel was too thin, Kawamura and Hi in particular advised the company to secure the barrel thickness even at the expense of weight. However, NITTOKU, which was adamant about its own design and weight reduction, did not adopt the findings in the Type 62 machine gun.

Procurement ended with the adoption of the successor 5.56 mm machine gun, the MINIMI, but these problems were not formally improved or enhanced for some 40 years after its official adoption.

In the end, these essential shortcomings were not corrected until the derivative Type 74 vehicle-mounted 7.62 mm machine gun, which was designed to ensure a thicker barrel at the expense of portability by being dedicated to vehicle use.

However, even for the Type 74 machine gun, which continues to be used in armoured fighting vehicles today, members of the generation who knew US military-supplied weapons before the Type 61 tank testified that the Browning M1919 heavy machine gun (cal. 30) was by far more reliable.

== Variants ==
=== Type 74 ===
The Type 74 (74式車載7.62mm機関銃, Nanayon-shiki Shasai Nana-ten-rokuni-miri Kikanjū) is a fixed mount variant for AFV use, including the Type 74, Type 90 and Type 10 MBTs, Mitsubishi Type 89 IFV and the Komatsu Type 87 Reconnaissance Vehicle.

It weighs 20.4 kg (45.0 lb), unlike the Type 62 which weighs 10.15 kg (22.4 lb).
