= Type 86 hand grenade =

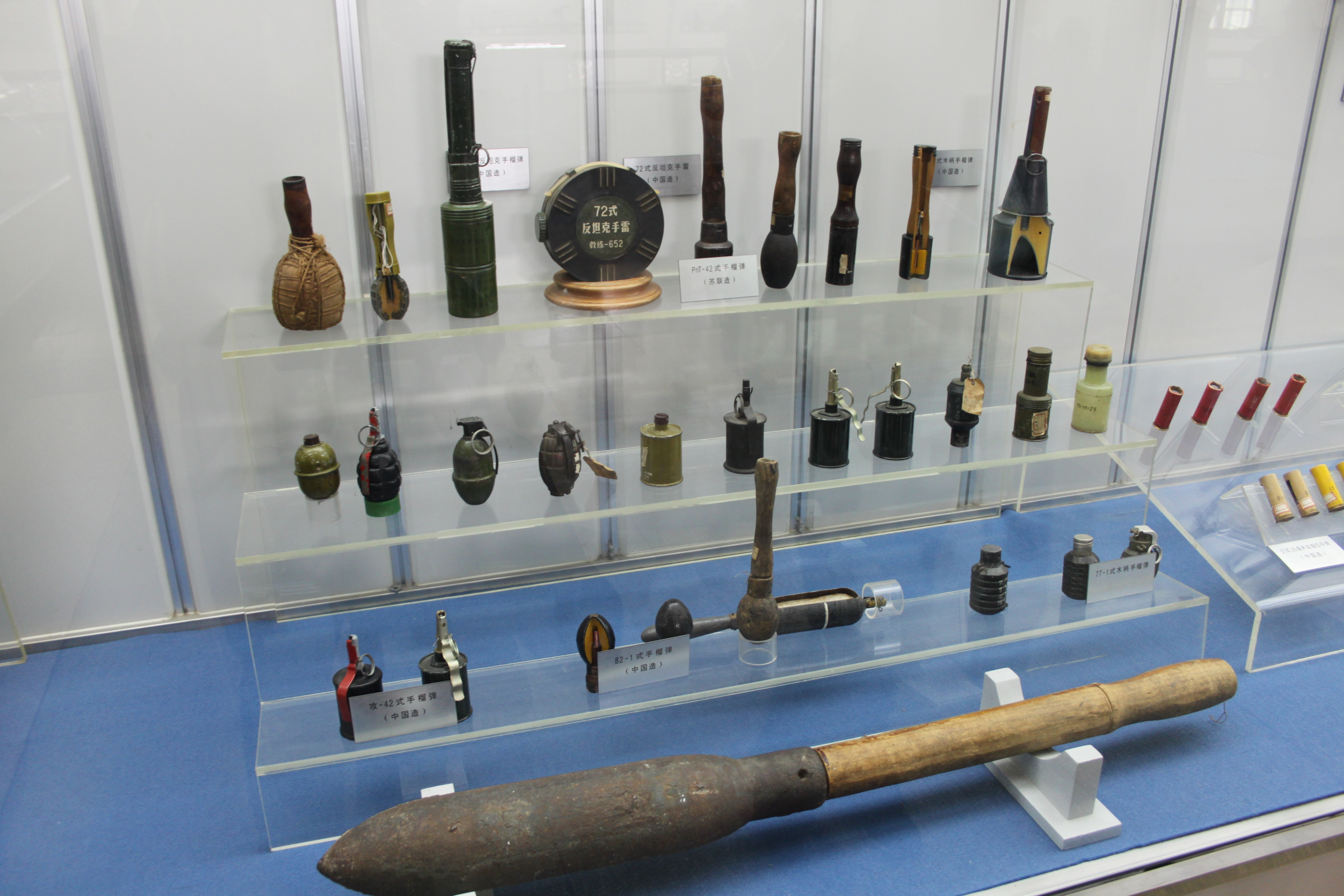
- Type 86 hand grenade can be seen in this collection
- Type: Hand grenade
- Place of origin: People's Republic of China

Service history
- In service: 1982 - present

Production history
- Produced: 1982 - present

The Type 86 hand grenade (Chinese: 86式手榴彈, lit. 'Type 86 Hand Grenade') is a hand grenade produced by the People's Republic of China. It is reportedly marketed by Norinco.

== History ==
The Type 86 is one of the standard hand grenades of the People’s Liberation Army alongside the Type 77, Type 82 and DSS-161.

In July 2022, ARES reported that Type 86P grenades were spotted in Syria, mostly used by pro-opposition groups.

== Design ==
Like the Type 82, the Type 86 uses the conventional oval shape and employs a special design which allows discreet and safe user operation.

The Type 86 may be used as an offensive and defensive weapon and is lighter than its predecessors thanks to its construction with plastic materials.

== Users ==
- China

== See also ==
- Type 67 hand grenade – (China)
- Type 77 hand grenade – (China)
- Type 82 hand grenade – (China)
- DSS-161 – (China)
