= Type 82 hand grenade =

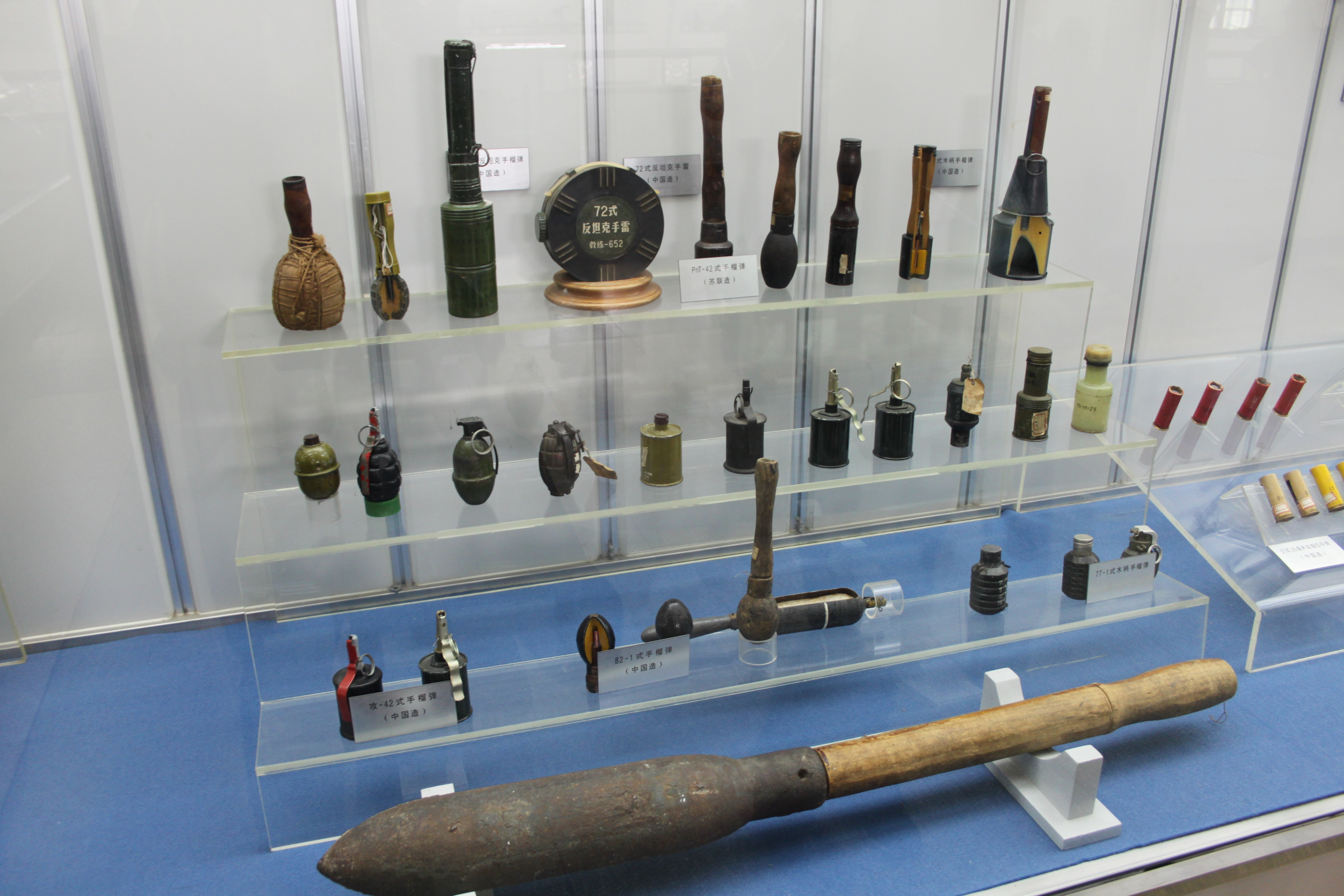
- Type 82 hand grenade can be seen at the last step on this display
- Type: Hand grenade
- Place of origin: People's Republic of China

Service history
- In service: 1982 - present

Production history
- Produced: 1982 - present

The Type 82 hand grenade (Chinese: 82式手榴彈, lit. 'Type 82 Hand Grenade') is a hand grenade series produced by the People's Republic of China. It is reportedly marketed by Norinco.

== Design ==
The Type 82 is different from on its predecessors, Type 67 and Type 77 grenades, which were inspired by the Stielhandgranate design, in particular, the Model 24. The Type 82 uses the conventional oval shape and employs a special design which allows discreet and safe user operation.

== Variants ==
The Type 82 consists of the Type 82-1, the Type 82-2, and the Type 82-3.

== Adoption ==
The Type 82-2 is one of the standard hand grenades of the People’s Liberation Army alongside the Type 77, Type 86 and DSS-161. The other Type 82 variants were not adopted.

== Users ==
- China
- Central African Republic
