= Mitsubishi Heavy Industries =

Japanese multinational corporation

Mitsubishi Heavy Industries, Ltd.

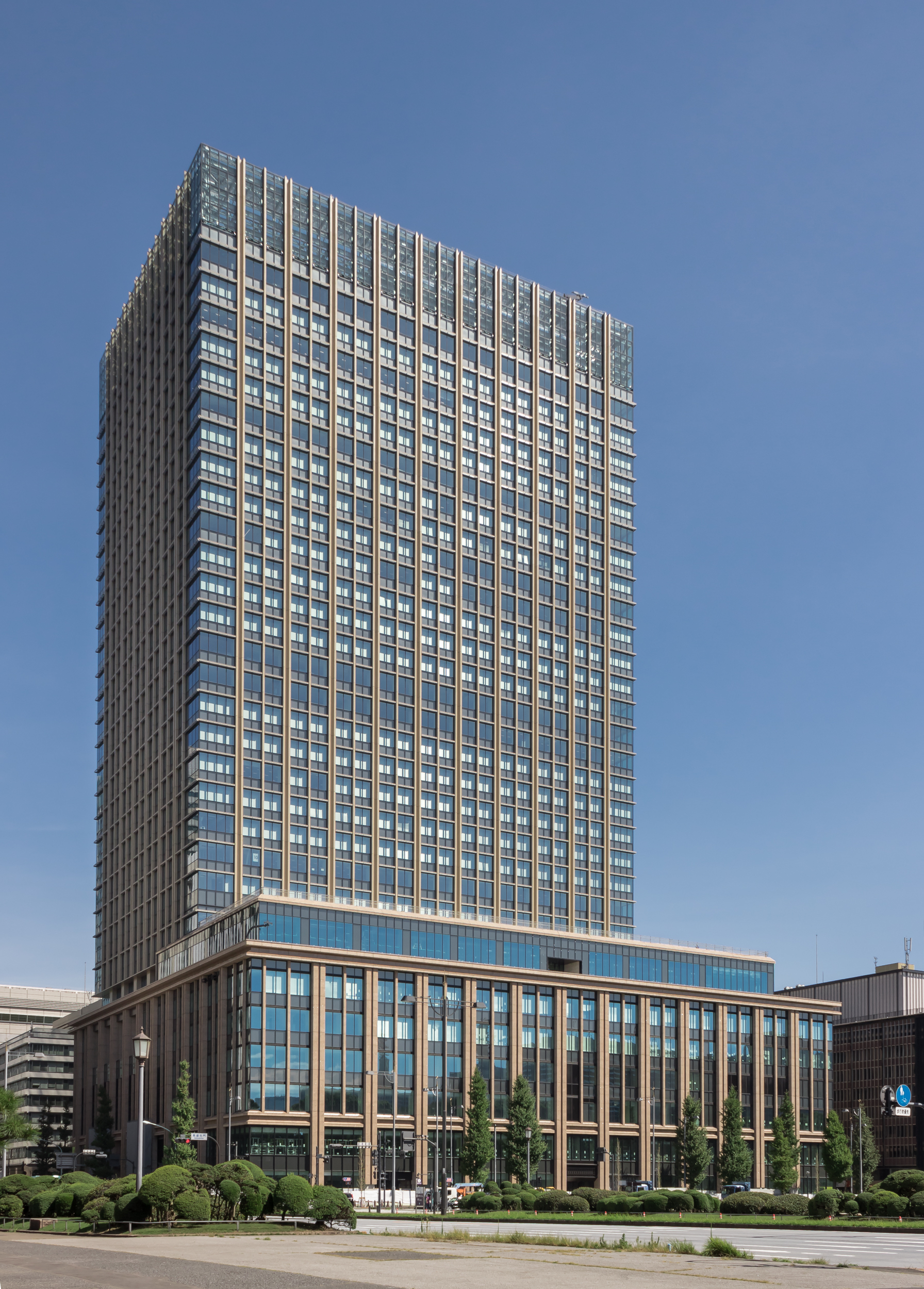
- Headquarters in Marunouchi, Chiyoda, Tokyo
- Native name: 三菱重工業株式会社
- Romanized name: Mitsubishi Jūkōgyō Kabushiki-kaisha
- Type: Public
- Traded as: TYO: 7011; FSE: 7011
- Industry: Energy; Aerospace; Defense; Logistics; Machinery; Shipbuilding & marine engineering; Engineering
- Founded: July 7, 1884; 142 years ago (original); January 11, 1950; 76 years ago (incorporation)
- Founder: Iwasaki Yatarō
- Headquarters: Marunouchi Nijūbashi Building, Marunouchi, Chiyoda, Tokyo, Japan
- Area served: Global
- Key people: Shunichi Miyanaga (chairman); Seiji Izumisawa (president & CEO)
- Products: Gas turbines; Nuclear power plants; Steam turbines; Wind turbines; Launch vehicles (e.g. H3, H-IIA); Military aircraft; Missiles & defense systems; Naval ships & submarines; HVAC equipment; Industrial machinery
- Services: EPC contracting; MRO services; Space launch services; Carbon capture & decarbonization solutions
- Revenue: ▲¥4.97 trillion (US$31.42 billion) (FY2026)
- Operating income: ▲¥432.2 billion (US$2.73 billion) (FY2026)
- Net income: ▲¥332.13 billion (US$2.1 billion) (FY2026)
- Total assets: ▲¥8.27 trillion (US$52.24 billion) (FY2026)
- Total equity: ▲¥3.23 trillion (US$20.39 billion) (FY2026)
- Number of employees: 78,793 (2026)
- Subsidiaries: Mitsubishi Logisnext; Mitsubishi FBR Systems; Mitsubishi Power; Mitsubishi Shipbuilding; Primetals Technologies; Mitsubishi Aircraft Corporation; MHI RJ Aviation Group
- Website: www.mhi.com

Mitsubishi Heavy Industries, Ltd. (Japanese: 三菱重工業株式会社, romanized: Mitsubishi Jūkōgyō Kabushiki-kaisha; MHI) is a Japanese multinational engineering, electrical equipment and electronics corporation headquartered in Tokyo, Japan. MHI is one of the core companies of the Mitsubishi Group and its automobile division is the predecessor of Mitsubishi Motors.

MHI's products include aerospace and automotive components, air conditioners, elevators, forklift trucks, hydraulic equipment, printing machines, missiles, tanks, power systems, ships, aircraft, railway systems, and space launch vehicles. Through its defense-related activities, it is the world's 32nd-largest defense contractor measured by 2024 arms revenues and the largest based in Japan.

== History ==
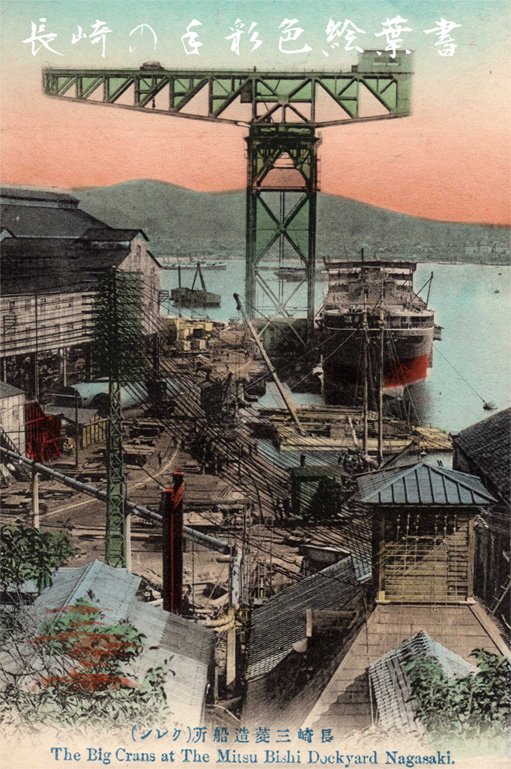
The Mitsubishi Dockyard at Nagasaki, Meiji Period

In 1857, at the request of the Tokugawa Shogunate, a group of Dutch engineers were invited, including Dutch naval engineer Hendrik Hardes, and began work on the Nagasaki Yotetsusho (長崎鎔鉄所), a modern, Western-style foundry and shipyard near the Dutch settlement of Dejima, at Nagasaki. This was renamed Nagasaki Seitetsusho (長崎製鉄所) Nagasaki Iron (Steel) Foundry in 1860, and construction was completed in 1861. Following the Meiji Restoration of 1868, the shipyard was placed under control of the new Government of Meiji Japan. The first dry dock was completed in 1879.

In 1884, Iwasaki Yatarō, the founder of Mitsubishi, leased the Nagasaki Seitetsusho from the Japanese government, renamed it the Nagasaki Shipyard & Machinery Works (長崎造船機械工) and entered the shipbuilding business on a large scale. Iwasaki purchased the shipyards outright in 1887. In 1891, "Mitsubishi Heavy Industries - Yokohama Machinery Works" was started as Yokohama Dock Company, Ltd. Its main business was ship repairs, to which it added ship servicing by 1897. The works was renamed Mitsubishi Shipyard of Mitsubishi Goshi Kaisha in 1893 and additional dry docks were completed in 1896 and 1905.

The "Mitsubishi Heavy Industries - Shimonoseki Shipyard & Machinery Works" was established in 1914. It produced industrial machinery and merchant ships.

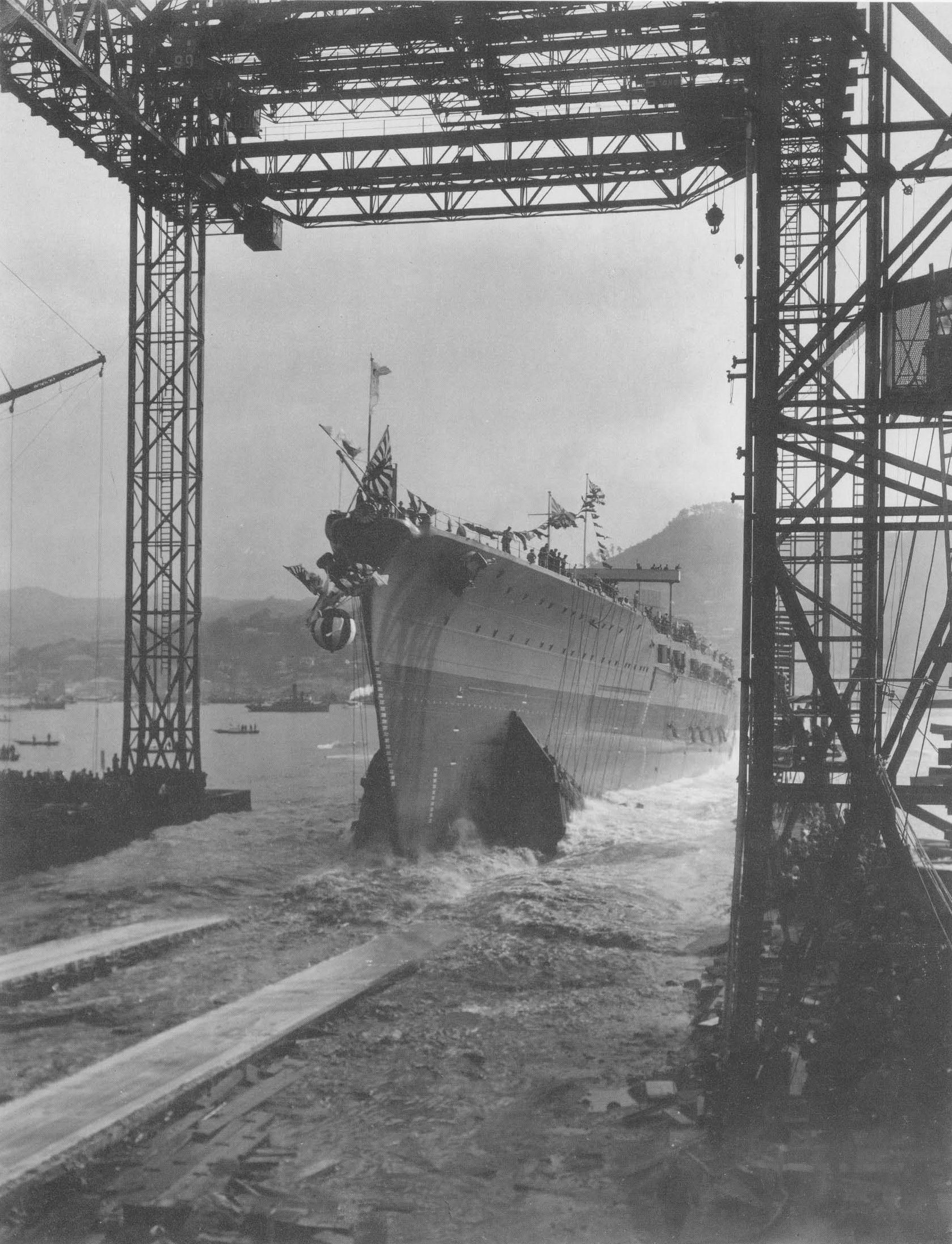
The launch of battleship Tosa at the Nagasaki Shipyard, 1921

The Nagasaki company was renamed Mitsubishi Shipbuilding & Engineering Company, Ltd. in 1917 and again renamed as Mitsubishi Heavy Industries in 1934. It became the largest private firm in Japan, active in the manufacture of ships, heavy machinery, airplanes and railway cars. Mitsubishi Heavy Industries merged with the Yokohama Dock Company in 1935. From its inception, the Mitsubishi Nagasaki shipyards were heavily involved in contracts for the Imperial Japanese Navy. The largest battleship Musashi was completed at Nagasaki in 1942. These connections made Nagasaki a target for strategic bombing during World War II by the Allied air forces, which later dropped an atomic bomb on the city on 9 August 1945. This attack, following the atomic bombing of Hiroshima three days earlier, dealt a devastating blow to the Japanese leadership, contributing to the surrender of Japan six days later.

The Kobe Shipyard of Mitsubishi Goshi Kaisha was established in 1905. The Kobe Shipyard merged with Mitsubishi Heavy Industries in 1934. The Kobe Shipyard constructed the ocean liner Argentina Maru (later repurposed as the aircraft carrier Kaiyo), and the submarines the I-19 and I-25.

Following the dissolution of the zaibatsu after the surrender of Japan at the end of World War II, Mitsubishi divided into three companies in January 1950: Mitsubishi Nagasaki became West Japan Heavy Industries, Ltd, the Kobe Shipyard became Central Japan Heavy-Industries, Ltd., and the Yokohama branch became East Japan Heavy-Industries, Ltd. On 28 April 1952 the Occupation of Japan ended, which meant that the ban on using zaibatsu names was lifted. Accordingly, all three companies changed names again on 7 May 1952: West Japan Heavy Industries (the Nagasaki Shipyard) was renamed Mitsubishi Shipbuilding & Engineering Co., Ltd., Central Japan Heavy Industries, Ltd. was renamed Shin-Mitsubishi Jukogyo K.K. (also trading as Mitsubishi Heavy Industries, Reorganized, Ltd.; shin meaning "New"), while East Japan Heavy-Industries became Mitsubishi Nippon Heavy Industries.

In 1964, the three independent companies from the 1950 break-up were merged into Shin-Mitsubishi Jukogyo and became Mitsubishi Heavy Industries, Ltd. The Nagasaki works was renamed the Nagasaki Shipyard & Engine Works. The Kobe works was renamed the 'Mitsubishi Heavy Industries - Kobe Shipyard & Machinery Works'.

In 1970, MHI's automobile parts department became an independent company as Mitsubishi Motors.

In 1974, its Tokyo headquarters was targeted in a bombing that killed eight people.

MHI participated in a ¥540 billion emergency rescue of Mitsubishi Motors in January 2005, in partnership with Mitsubishi Corporation and Mitsubishi Tokyo Financial Group. As part of the rescue, MHI acquired ¥50 billion of Mitsubishi Motors stock, increasing its ownership stake to 15 percent and making the automaker an affiliate again. The emergency rescue was carried out 4 years after a product recall scandal in Japan that was triggered by accusations of Mitsubishi Motors allegedly trying to systematically hide manufacturing defects to avoid recalls, and marketing problems in the US.

In 1994, MHI opened the Mitsubishi Minatomirai Industrial Museum in Yokohama which is mainly a museum for kids to experience science and technology.

In October 2009, MHI announced an order for up to 100 regional jets from the United States–based airline Trans States Holdings.

MHI entered talks with Hitachi in August 2011 about a potential merger of the two companies, in what would have been the largest merger between two Japanese companies in history. The talks subsequently broke down and were suspended.

In November 2012, MHI and Hitachi agreed to merge their thermal power generation businesses into a joint venture to be owned 65% by MHI and 35% by Hitachi. The joint venture began operations in February 2014 and ended in 2020, as Hitachi transferred its shares to MHI.

In June 2014, Siemens and MHI announced their formation of joint ventures to bid for Alstom's troubled energy and transportation businesses (in locomotives, steam turbines, and aircraft engines). A rival bid by General Electric (GE) has been criticized by French government sources, who consider Alstom's operations as a "vital national interest" at a moment when the French unemployment level stands above 10% and some voters are turning towards the conservative party. GE's proposal ultimately prevailed.

MHI had entered the high-speed train business in 1995, with the manufacture of the MLX01 SCMaglev car, a business it exited in 2017 after struggling with the development costs of the Mitsubishi SpaceJet, and disagreements with Central Japan Railway Company over the manufacturing costs of the SCMaglev cars.

In February 2021, MHI sold its machine tools business MHI Machine Tool Co. to Nidec.

In June 2024, MHI announced it will cease newspaper rotary printing press production due to declining demand. At the time the company held a 50% share of the Japanese rotary press market.

== Operations ==
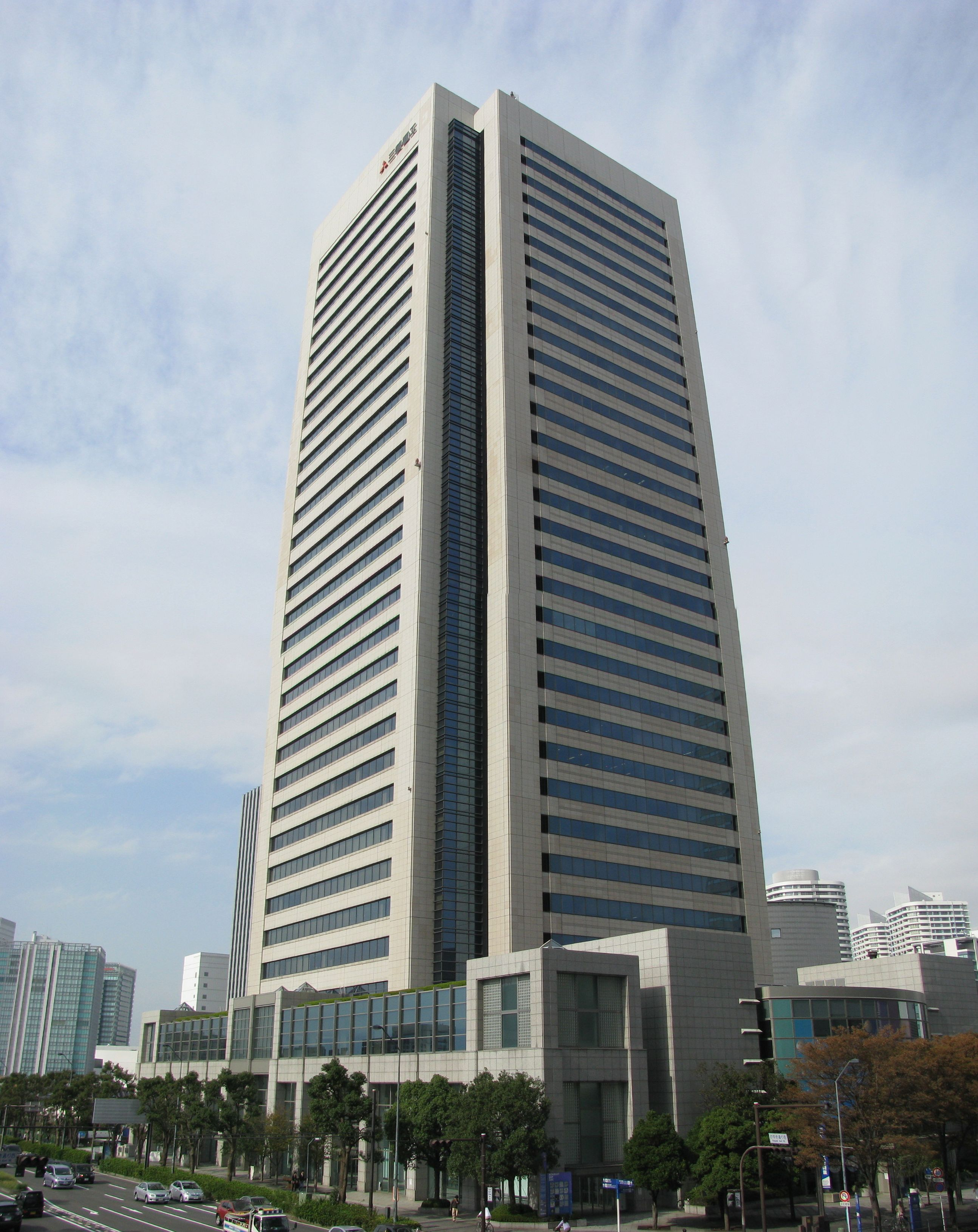
Mitsubishi Heavy Industries building in Yokohama, Japan

=== Aerospace ===
MHI has aerospace facilities in Nagoya, Aichi, Komaki, Aichi and Mississauga, Canada.

In the 1950s, the company began to re-enter the aerospace industry in earnest. Along with other major Japanese companies it was involved in design and production of the NAMC YS-11, the first Japanese airliner to enter production after World War II. In 1956, work started on the design of the Mitsubishi MU-2, which became the company's first postwar aircraft design.

In the defense sector, MHI has produced jet fighters for the Japan Air Self-Defense Force and anti-submarine helicopters for the Japan Maritime Self-Defense Force, as well as aero-engines, missiles and torpedoes. It produced North American F-86 Sabre, Lockheed F-104 Starfighter and McDonnell Douglas F-4 Phantom II fighters. It manufactured 139 Mitsubishi F-15J fighter aircraft from 1981 and produced 200 Sikorsky S-70 family Mitsubishi H-60 helicopters from 1989, in both cases under license production. The company also plays an important role in the Japanese Ballistic Missile Defense System program.

In the space systems sector, MHI is the producer of the former H-IIA and H-IIB; and current H3 launch vehicles, Japan's main rockets, and provides launch services for national institutions and companies around the world. The clients include JAXA, KARI, Mohammed bin Rashid Space Centre, and Inmarsat. The company is also involved in the International Space Station program as a cargo spaceship contractor.

On 1 April 2008, MHI established Mitsubishi Aircraft Corporation as a subsidiary to develop and produce the MRJ or Mitsubishi Regional Jet, a 70 to 90 passenger regional airliner. MHI is the majority shareholder of the new company, with Toyota Motor Corporation owning 10%.

On 12 December 2012, MHI acquired Pratt & Whitney Power Systems, the small gas turbine business of United Technologies.

In the civil aircraft sector, MHI develops and manufactures major airframe components, including fuselage panels for the Boeing 777 and composite-material wing boxes for the 787. In June 2014, the company joined four other major Japanese companies in signing an agreement to build parts for Boeing's 777X aircraft.

On 25 June 2019, MHI announced the acquisition of Bombardier Aviation's CRJ programme, in a deal expected to close in the first half of 2020, subject to regulatory approval. MHI will benefit from Bombardier's global expertise in areas ranging from engineering and certification to customer relations and support, boosting its SpaceJet (formerly MRJ) programme, and potentially enabling the SpaceJet to be produced in North America. The deal includes two service centres in Canada and two in the US, as well as the type certificates for the CRJ. Bombardier will retain its assembly facility at Mirabel, near Montreal, Canada, and will continue to produce the CRJ on behalf of MHI until the current order backlog is complete. In early May 2020, MHI confirmed that all conditions had been met and that the transaction would be closed on 1 June. The acquired aviation unit was then renamed MHI RJ Aviation Group.

MHI recorded a loss in FY 2020 partly because of the continuous delays of the first delivery of the SpaceJet. At the height of the COVID-19 pandemic that crippled the aviation industry, MHI decided to put a halt to the project.

=== Defense ===
In 2010, MHI commenced production of the Type 10 advanced main battle tank, at a cost of $11.3 million per unit, to replace the Type 90 tank.

=== Energy ===
The nuclear business of MHI operates facilities in the cities of Kobe and Takasago in Hyogo Prefecture and in Yokohama, Kanagawa Prefecture. It also operates a nuclear fuel manufacturing plant in Tōkai, Ibaraki which processes 440 metric tons of Uranium per year.

MHI has also developed the Mitsubishi APWR design. MHI has also signed a memorandum of understanding with Areva for the establishment of a joint venture, Atmea, for their next reactor design ATMEA1.

MHI has also been selected as the core company to develop a new generation of Fast Breeder Reactors (FBR) by the Japanese government. After that announcement was made, MHI established a new company, Mitsubishi FBR Systems, Inc. (MFBR) specifically for the development and realization of FBR technology, starting what is likely to be the most aggressive corporate venture into FBR and Generation IV reactor technology.

In 2011, Mitsubishi launched the Type-J gas turbines. These turbines were Mitsubishi's first combined-cycle gas turbines in the 1700°C-class, and also the first to surpass 60% operational efficiency. A key factor was the use of single-crystal turbine blades (MGA1700 alloy), which are considerably stronger than multi-crystal blades due to the lack of grain boundaries. In addition, the thermal barrier coating (TBC) of the blades have been improved, with the new thermally sprayed ceramic coating offering higher porosity and thus lower thermal conductivity than sintered materials. These upgrades allow for an inlet temperature of 1600 Celsius.

As of 2015, MHI was developing a $15.8 billion nuclear power plant in Sinop, Turkey in partnership with Itochu and Engie, which would be its first overseas nuclear project. The deal has been officially scrapped in January 2020, after the feasibility of the project was doubted.

MHI unsuccessfully attempted to acquire the energy business of Alstom in 2014 in order to develop its service network in Southeast Asia. MHI remains interested in acquisitions in the crude oil and gas sectors as of 2015. Following financial difficulties at Areva, MHI announced in 2015 it would make a proposal to take a minority ownership stake in a new entity called inheriting Areva's nuclear reactor business and acquired a 19% stake in the entity in 2017. In 2018, the entity has been named Framatome.

In 2020, MHI eventually acquired Hitachi's gas turbine business unit after the two companies had merged their businesses to form a joint venture.

Subsidiary Mitsubishi Power manufactures solid oxide fuel cells (SOFCs) and hybrid SOFC and micro gas turbine Megamie power generation systems.

=== Shipbuilding ===
Shipbuilding has been a core and historical founding activity for MHI. It was formally started in 1884 when Mitsubishi leased and then acquired the 'Nagasaki Shipyard & Machinery Works' company (founded in 1857 as 'Nagasaki Yotetsusho Foundry'). Subsequently, Mitsubishi progressively became one of the major Japanese shipbuilding companies, building both commercial as well as military ships, including the Yamato-class battleship, Musashi, of the Imperial Japanese Navy during World War II.

MHI has shipbuilding facilities in Nagasaki, Kobe and Shimonoseki, Japan. Nagasaki Shipyard & Machinery Works (三菱重工長崎造船所, Mitsubishi Juko Nagasaki Zosenjo) is the primary shipbuilding division of MHI. It primarily produces specialized commercial vessels, including LNG carriers, and passenger cruise ships.

On 1 December 2017, MHI announced that it will launch two new wholly owned companies on 1 January 2018 in conjunction with reorganization of its shipbuilding business:

- A new subsidiary, Mitsubishi Shipbuilding Co., Ltd., was created to primarily undertake construction of ships that require intensive outfitting and advanced technologies, mainly based on the Yokohama, Shimonoseki and Nagasaki shipyards.
- Separately, Mitsubishi Heavy Industries Marine Structure Co., Ltd. will mainly engage in the manufacture of large ships and marine structures.

In late 2019, MHI, exploring a withdrawal from LNG carrier construction, started to negotiate with Oshima Shipbuilding to divest its historic shipyard located in Koyagi, Nagasaki.

On 24 December 2019, Mitsubishi Shipbuilding delivered its first fuel gas supply system for a marine LNG engine.

In June 2020, MHI entered talks with Mitsui Engineering & Shipbuilding to acquire the latter's naval and patrol ship business. The deal would strengthen MHI's defense sector, effectively consolidating Japan's defense industry as well. The deal is expected to be reached by the end of 2020, with the parties closing the transaction by October 2021, if approved by regulators.

On 17 January 2022, the first successful sea voyage of an unmanned, fully autonomous vessel was successfully carried out by the Soleil, built by MHI. The demonstration, conducted in cooperation of Shin Nihonkai Ferry, sailed 240 kilometres, from Shinmoji in Northern Kyushu, to the Iyonada Sea, over seven hours, with a maximum speed of 26 knots.

In the LIMA 2023 convention, MHI unveiled the Multi-Role Support Ship concept for visitors.

MHI reported on 26 February 2025 that Australian operations will be expanded as part of efforts to secure potential contracts for the Mogami-class ships to enter Australian service. On 5 August 2025, Australia announced MHI as the preferred supplier of a frigate based on the Mogami-class.

=== Wind power ===
MHI has installed more 3,282 MW worldwide until December 2009, mainly turbines with 1 and 2.4 MW. The company is developing 7-MW-turbines for offshore wind power. Tests are planned for 2013 in Europe.

On 27 September 2013, MHI and Vestas Wind Systems announced a joint-venture named MHI Vestas Offshore Wind to develop offshore wind energy based on Vestas' V164 8.0MW turbine. In 2020, MHI acquired 2.5% of Vestas by transferring its 50% of MHI Vestas to Vestas, and receiving 5 million new Vestas shares.

== Products ==
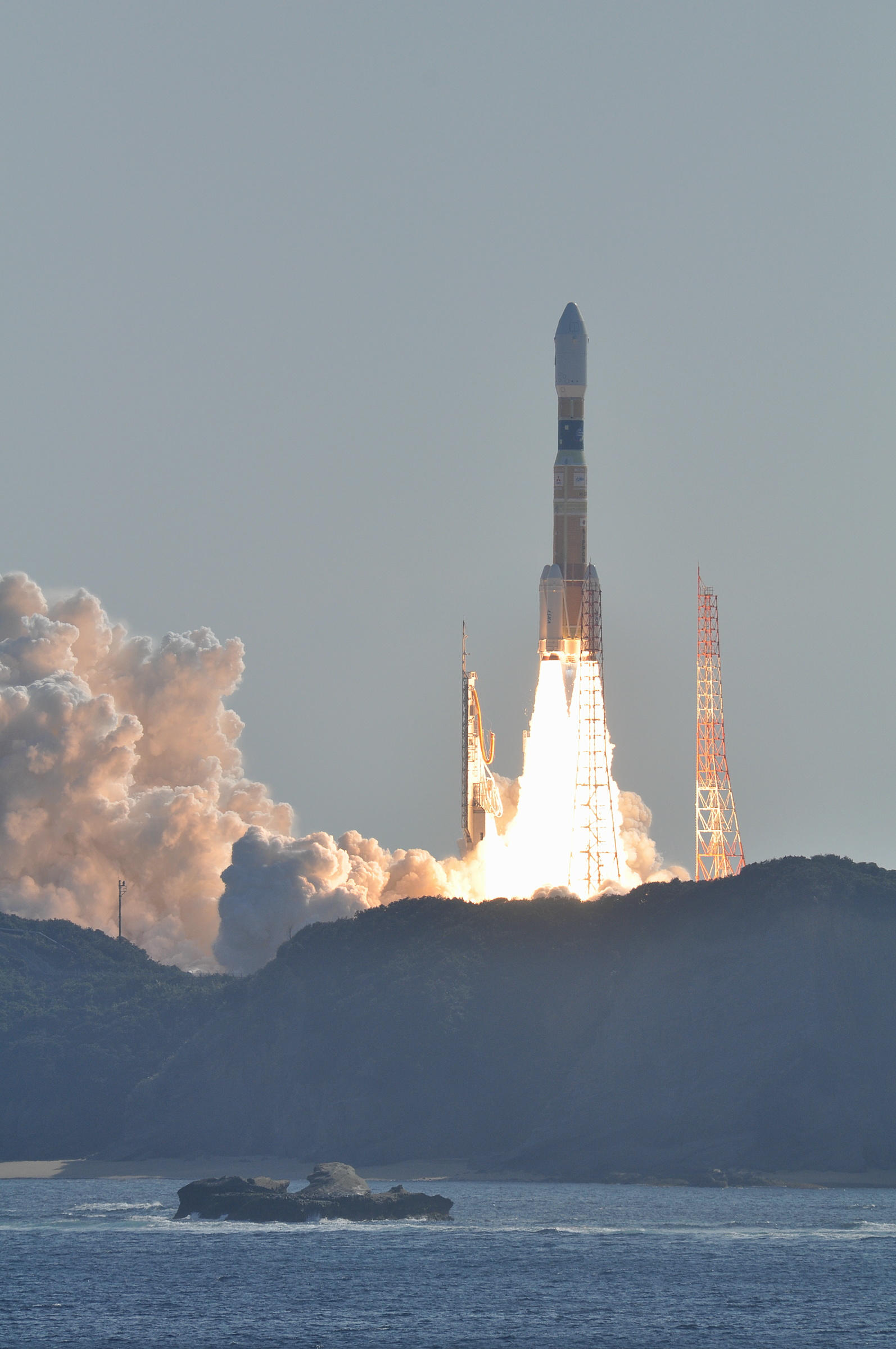
Liftoff of the second flight of the H-IIB expendable launch system

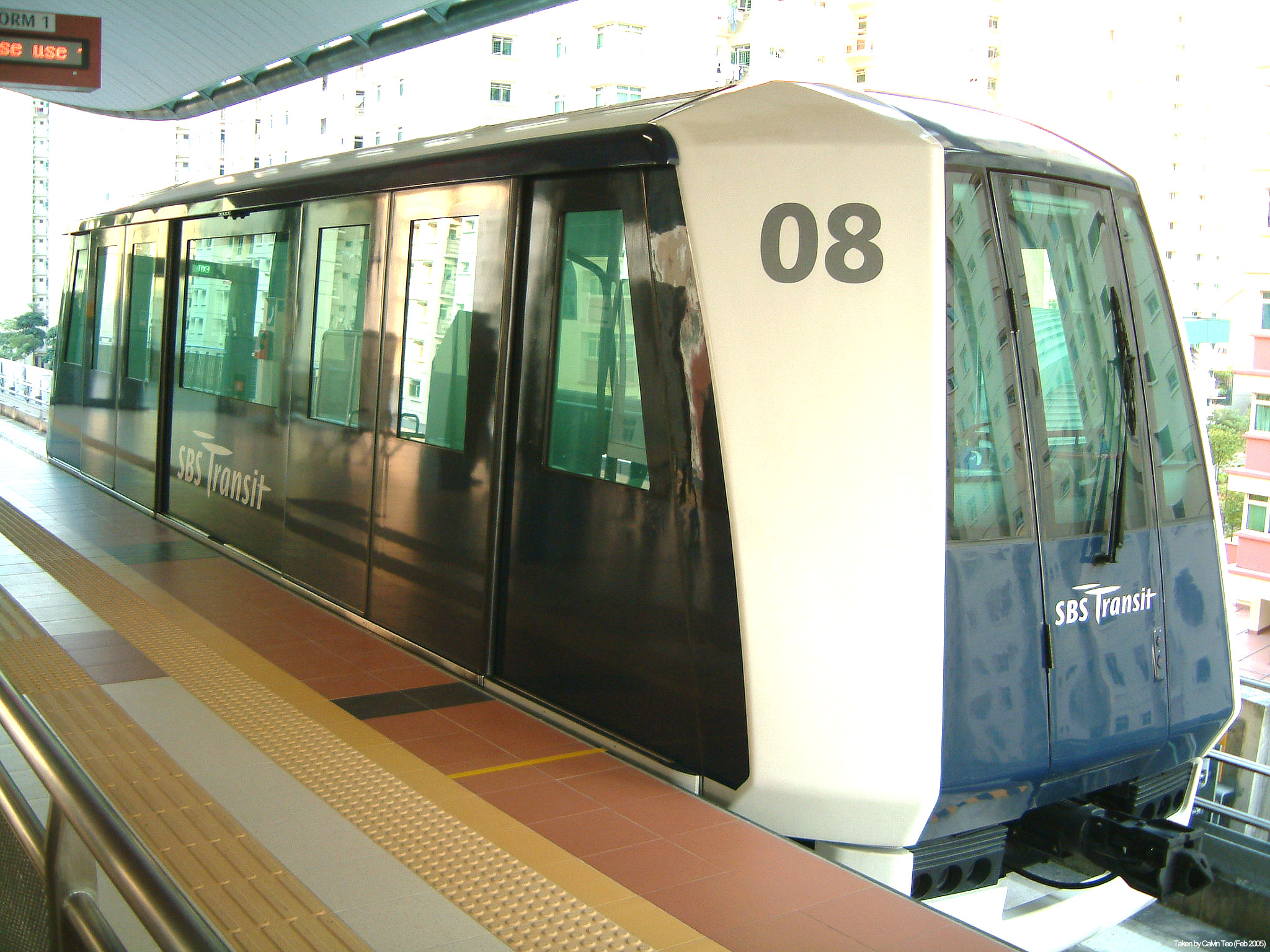
The Crystal Mover C810, an automated people mover manufactured by MHI for airport and light rail applications

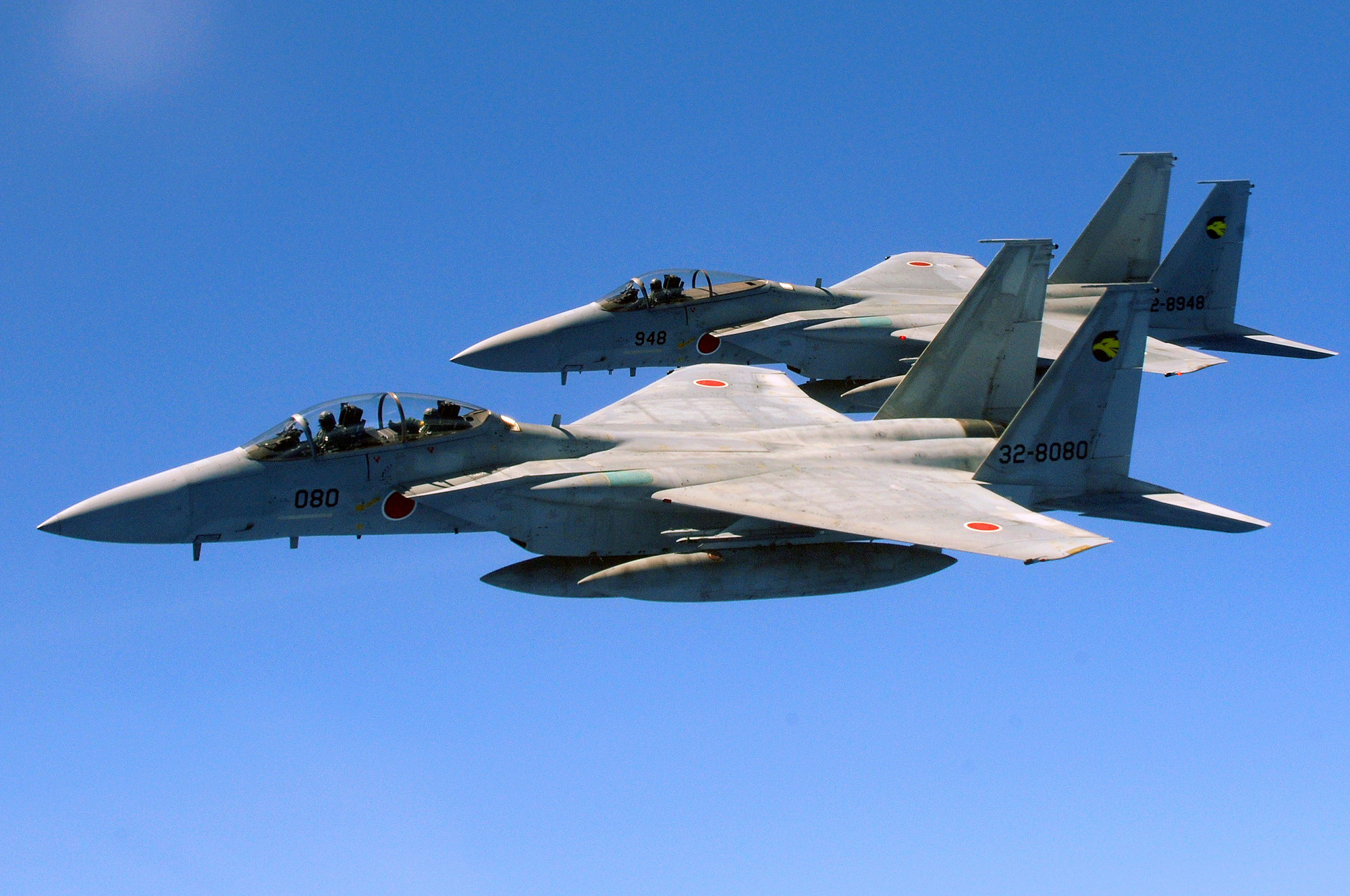
Mitsubishi F-15J

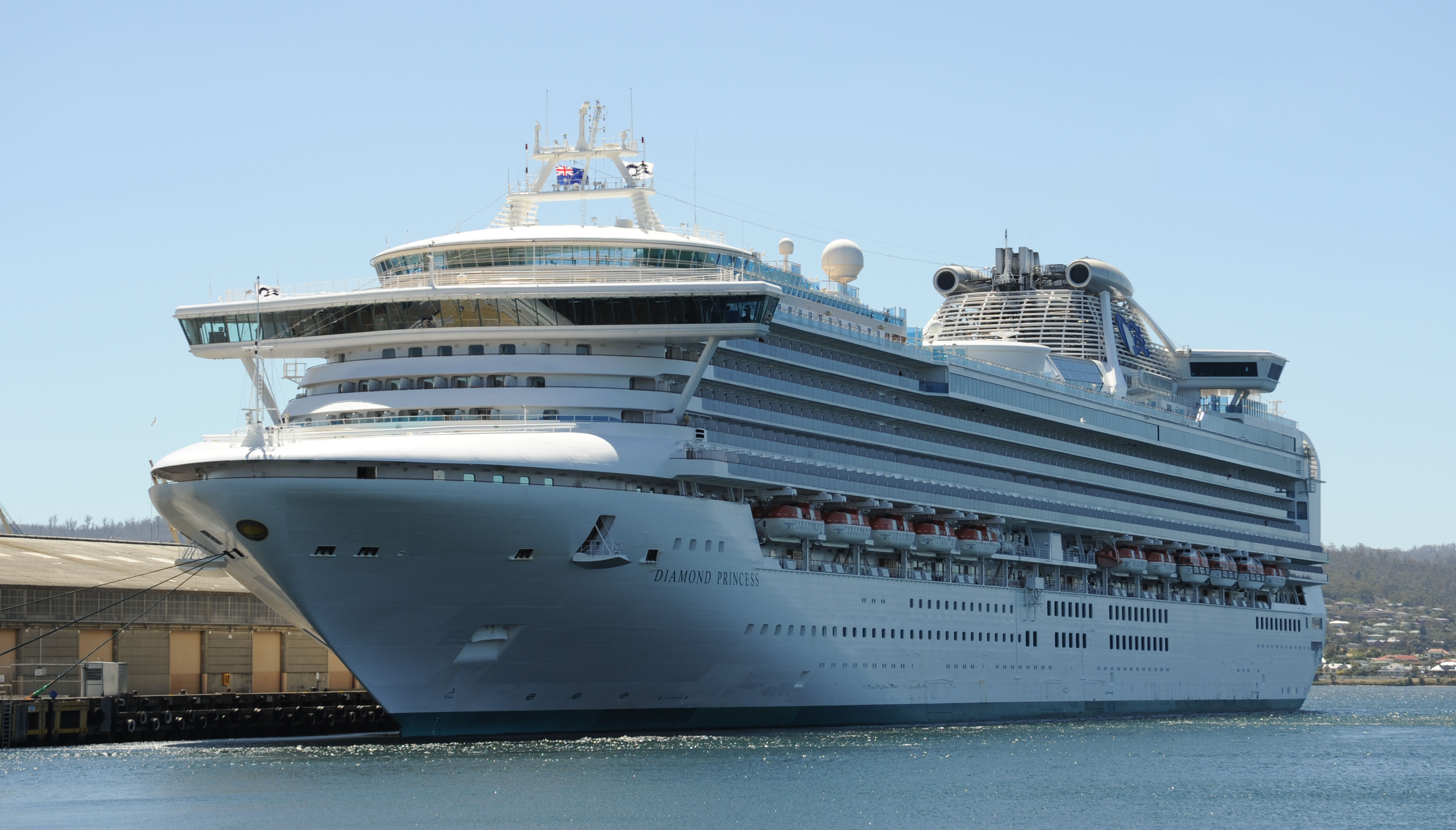
Diamond Princess docked in Hobart, Australia

MHI's products include:

- Aerospace systems
  - Aircraft
    - Some 40 Imperial Military & Navy aircraft models, such as the:
      - Mitsubishi A6M Zero
      - Mitsubishi A7M Reppū
      - Mitsubishi J2M Raiden
      - Mitsubishi J8M/Ki-200 Shūsui
      - Mitsubishi Ki-67 Hiryū
    - Mitsubishi F-1
    - Mitsubishi F-2
    - Mitsubishi F-15J
    - Mitsubishi G4M
    - Mitsubishi H-60
    - Mitsubishi MH2000
    - Mitsubishi MU-2
    - Mitsubishi MU-300 Diamond
    - Mitsubishi RP-1
    - Mitsubishi T-2
    - Mitsubishi Regional Jet (cancelled)
    - Mitsubishi X-2 Shinshin
    - CRJ Series - acquired from Bombardier Aerospace models 700 series onward in 2019 and completed mid 2020; renamed MHI RJ Aviation Group.
  - Space launch vehicles:
    - H-I (with license from McDonnell-Douglas)
    - H-II
    - H-IIA
    - H-IIB
    - H3
    - N-I (with license from McDonnell-Douglas)
    - N-II (with license from McDonnell-Douglas)
  - Spacecraft and satellites:
    - Centrifuge Accommodations Module
    - H-II Transfer Vehicle
    - HOPE-X
    - HTV-X
    - HYFLEX
    - Kibo (ISS module)
    - LUPEX Rover
    - RAISE-3
    - RAISE-4
  - Spacecraft components
    - XRISM reaction control system
- Air conditioning and refrigeration systems

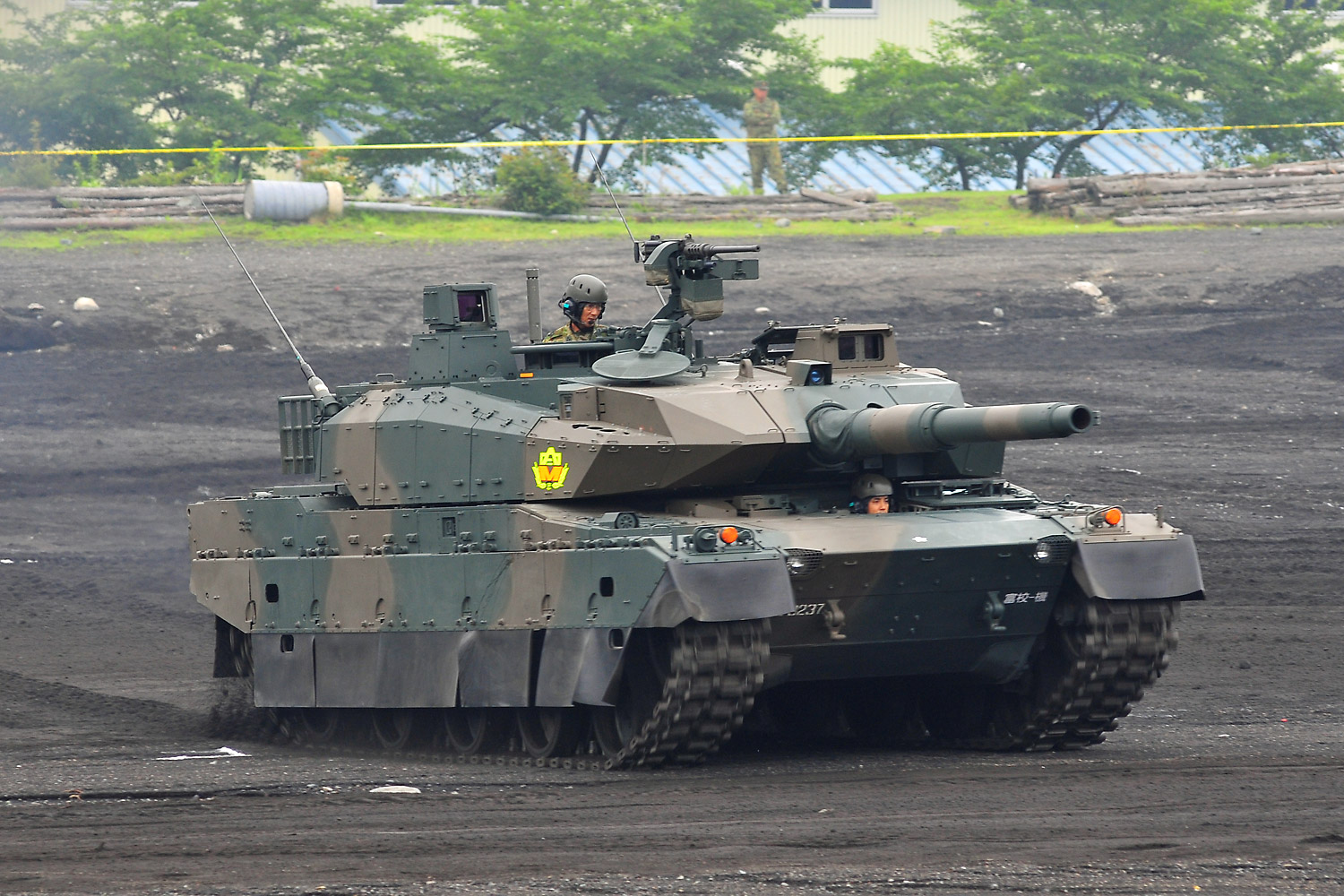
A Type 10 main battle tank

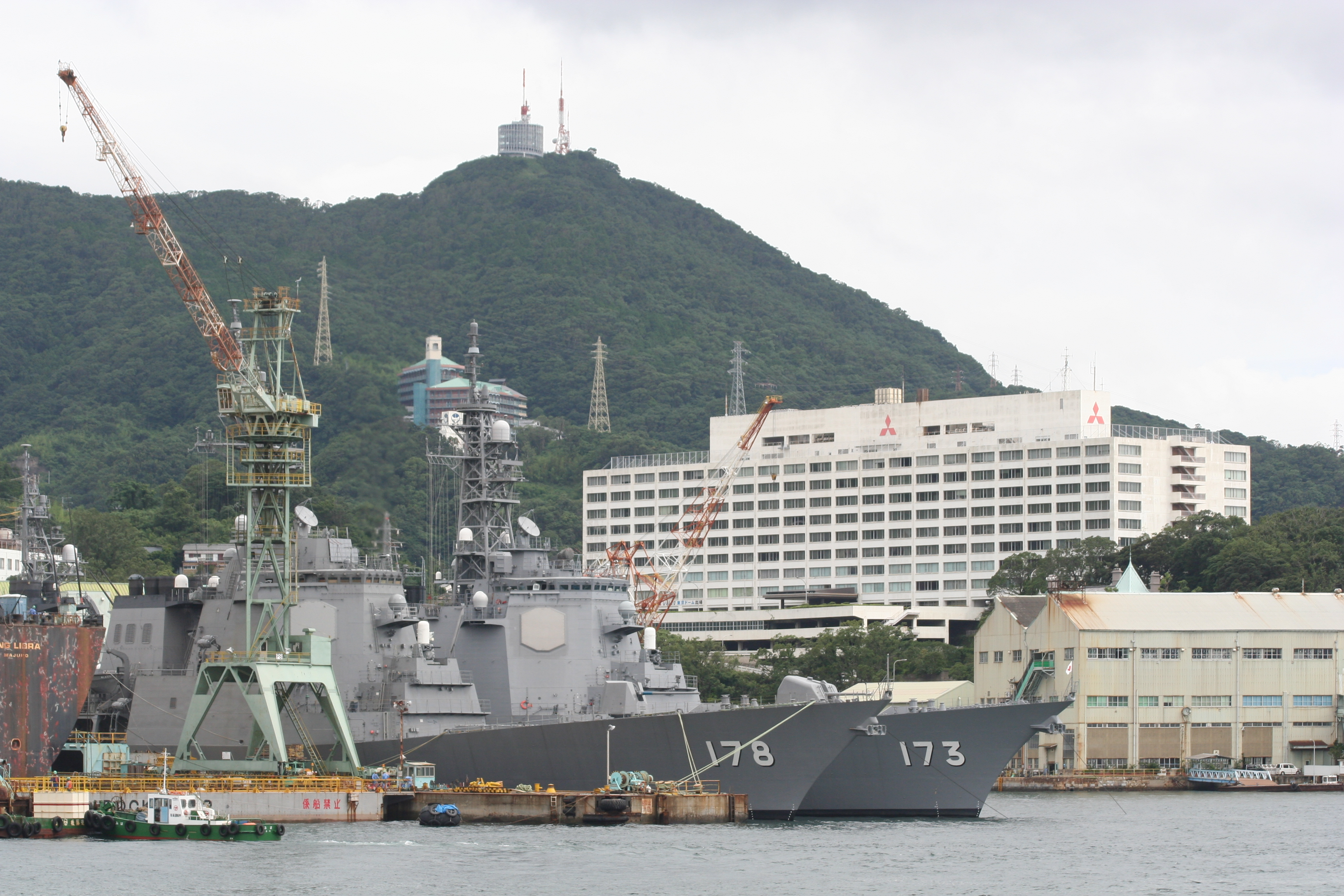
JS Kongō and JS Ashigara under construction

- Defense
  - Armoured fighting vehicles
    - Type 16 maneuver combat vehicle
    - Type 99 155 mm self-propelled howitzer
    - Mobile Armored Vehicle
    - Type 24 Wheeled Armored Fighting Vehicle
    - Type 24 Mobile 120 mm Mortar
    - Type 25 Reconnaissance and Combat Vehicle
  - Tanks
    - Type 10
    - Type 90 Kyū-maru
    - Type 87 self-propelled anti-aircraft gun
    - Mitsubishi Type 89 IFV
  - Missiles
    - AAM-1 (Japanese missile) infrared homing air-to-air missile
    - AAM-2 all-aspect infrared homing air-to-air missile
    - AAM-3 all-aspect infrared homing air-to-air missile
    - AAM-4
    - AAM-5
    - Nike J surface-to-air missile
    - Type 12 surface-to-ship missile
    - Type 80 air-to-ship missile
    - Type 88 surface-to-ship missile
    - Type 90 ship-to-ship missile
    - Type 91 air-to-ship missile
    - Type 93 air-to-ship missile
  - Warships
    - Pre-1945 (some dozen major and minor ships):
      - Yamato-class battleship Musashi
      - Unryū-class aircraft carrier
      - Kongō-class battlecruiser
      - Akizuki-class destroyer
    - Post-1945
      - Atago-class destroyer
      - Harushio-class submarine
      - Hatakaze-class destroyer
      - Kongō-class destroyer
      - Tachikaze-class destroyer
      - Takanami-class destroyer
      - Natsushio-class submarine
      - Oyashio-class submarine
      - Sōryū-class submarine
      - Hayabusa-class patrol boat
  - Torpedoes
- Desalination equipment
- Diesel engines
- Electric buses
- Energy equipment
  - Fossil fuel electricity generation equipment
    - Boilers
    - Combined cycles
    - Gas turbines
    - Steam turbines
  - Fuel cells
  - Renewable energy equipment
    - Wind turbines
  - Traction batteries.
- Forklifts
- Industrial machinery
  - Injection molding machine
  - Machine tools
  - Compressors
  - Paper and printing machinery
- Pepsi Spire
- Railway vehicles
  - Crystal Mover
  - K-stock metro cars with Rotem - MTR
  - Manila Metro Rail Transit System Line 3 RT8D5 LRVs with ČKD Tatra
  - Traction motors
- Robots
  - MEISTeR (Robot)
- Ships and marine structures
  - Cruise ships
    - Sapphire Princess
    - Diamond Princess
    - M/S Amadea
    - M/S Asuka II
    - O'Mega, built as a small cruise ship, but was converted into a luxury yacht between 2002 and 2003.
    - AIDAprima
    - AIDAperla
  - Ferries
  - LNG carriers
  - LPG carriers
  - Oil tankers
  - Deep-submergence vehicles
    - DSV Shinkai 2000
    - DSV Shinkai 6500
  - Chikyū (Ocean-going Drilling Vessel)
- Turbochargers

== Controversies ==
In 2015 Mitsubishi Heavy Industries apologized and compensated victims of Chinese forced labor by Japan during World War II. Yonhap News Agency criticized Mitsubishi for rescuing Chinese victims while turning a blind eye to Korean victims.

On 28 November 2018, MHI was ordered by the South Korea Supreme Court to pay 150 million won ($133,000; £104,000) in compensation to 10 surviving Koreans who were victims of forced labor which the company oversaw during the Japanese occupation of Korea. Eighteen family members of other victims of the forced labour overseen by MHI, who had previously sued sometime before 2008, were now able to receive the compensation as well by the decision. All twenty-eight plaintiffs had previously filed a lawsuit in Japan, but had their lawsuit dismissed by the Supreme Court of Japan in 2008.

The Japanese government has officially disputed the lawsuit and defined the verdict as "a breach of the international law", citing the 1965 agreement which was made by the two nations to establish diplomatic relations, since all of the "problems concerning property, rights, and interests" that had been existed between the two countries and respective peoples thereof during the occupation era "have been settled completely and finally".

During the 2022 Russian invasion of Ukraine, MHI did not withdraw from the Russian market. The Yale CELI List of Companies, identifying how companies were reacting to Russia's invasion, identified MHI as one of the companies "defying demands for exit/reduction of activities".
