= Mobile Armored Vehicle =

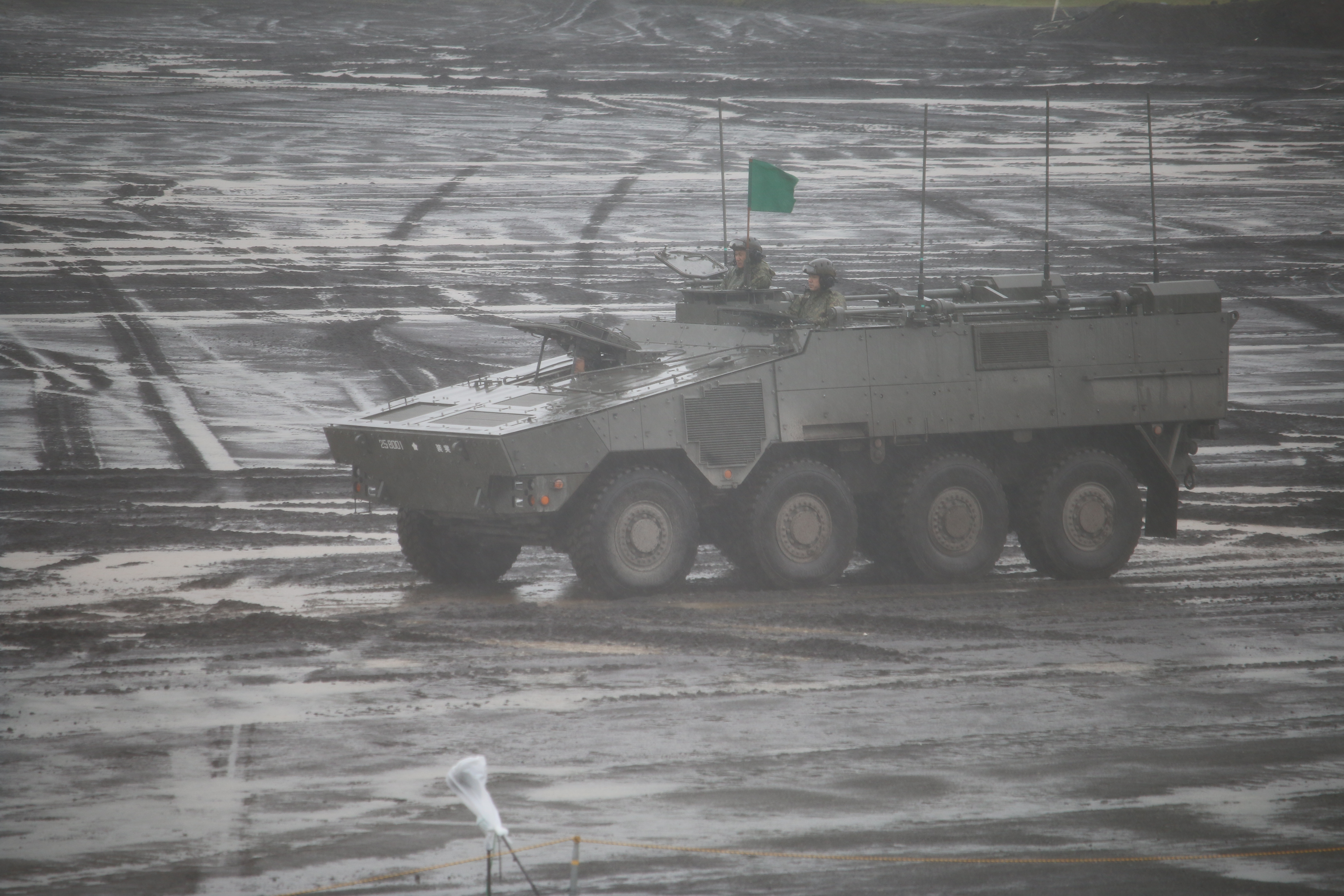
- The Type 24 Mobile 120 mm Mortar, which was developed from the MAV.
- Type: Armored fighting vehicle
- Place of origin: Japan

Production history
- Designer: TRDI (Technical Research & Development Institute) (Note: Became the Acquisition, Technology & Logistics Agency in 2015.)
- Designed: 2010 - 2024
- Manufacturer: Mitsubishi Heavy Industries
- Developed from: Type 16 maneuver combat vehicle
- Unit cost: ¥ 1 billion yen (USD $7.04 million) (Note: Unit cost is based on the 2024 budget, with ¥ 24.2 billion for 24 ICV (first serial production order))
- Produced: Since 2024 (serial production)
- No. built: 3 prototypes as of 2024
- Variants: Type 24 - Wheeled Armored Fighting Vehicle; Type 25 Reconnaissance and Combat Vehicle; Type 24 - Mobile 120mm Mortar

The Mobile Armored Vehicle (MAV) is a wheeled armored vehicle designed by Mitsubishi Heavy Industries (MHI). This vehicle is based on the Type 16 maneuver combat vehicle and was submitted to several Japan Ground Self-Defense Force procurement programs. It was selected by the Common Tactical Wheeled Vehicle program and variants of the MAV were designated as the Type 24 and Type 25.

== Background ==
=== Type 96 successor ===
Development of the MAV was initiated in the early 2010s and it was unveiled in 2014 at Eurosatory. It is derived from the Type 16 with which it shared 80% of its components. The vehicle was initially developed for the "Improved Wheeled Armored Personnel Carrier" program, as a successor to the Type 96 armored personnel carrier. The two vehicles submitted to the procurement program were the MHI MAV and the Komatsu Ltd. Chemical Reconnaissance Vehicle.

Initially, the offer by Komatsu was selected, but due to problems with the armor and other elements, the program was cancelled.

A new program for the replacement of the Type 96 was put in place, and is known as the "Next Generation Armored Vehicle". The main variant will be an armored personnel carrier, but there will also by command-and-control vehicles, armored ambulances, logistics support vehicles and engineer variants. The offers made for this program include:

- Mitsubishi Heavy Industries MAV
- Patria AMV^{XP}
- General Dynamics Land Systems Canada (GLDS) and Sojitz Aerospace LAV 6.0

The GDLS offering was dropped because it was unable to provide a prototype for testing on the timeline required by the JSDF. During testing, the Patria AMV^{XP} was considered superior by the Ministry of Defense in terms of basic performance and cost, and it was selected in December 2022.

=== Common Tactical Wheeled Vehicle ===
After the completion of the Improved Wheeled Armored Personnel Carrier program, the initial program intended to produce a replacement for the Type 96, the MAV was adopted under the Common Tactical Wheeled Vehicle program. In December 2019, the JGSDF ordered prototypes of three new variants of the MAV under the "Common Tactical Wheeled Vehicle" program:

- Type 24 Wheeled Armored Fighting Vehicle
- Type 24 Mobile 120 mm Mortar
- Type 25 Reconnaissance Combat Vehicle
