= MEISTeR =

The Maintenance Equipment Integrated System of Telecontrol Robot (MEISTeR) is a service robot by the Mitsubishi Heavy Industries (MHI). It was specifically designed to work at the devastated Fukushima Daiichi Nuclear Power Plant.

It was presented to the public on December 6, 2012.

== History ==
After the 9.0 earthquake and subsequent tsunami that hit Japan on March 11, 2011, and the destruction of the Fukushima Daiichi Nuclear Power Plant, the industry went on a quest of providing robots able to do dangerous work at the power plant. One such solution was the HAL exoskeleton. However, the HAL exoskeleton required a human pilot. On November 23, 2012, Toshiba presented a Tetrapod which failed during the presentation.

Until recently, MHI had only created a household communication robot and the MARS-D robot. As a constructor of 20 nuclear plants in Japan, it was natural for the Mitsubishi Heavy Industries to respond to the crisis with their own robot.

== Design ==
The MEISTeR (German for master) is a twin-armed four-tracked robot. It is based on the Rabot robot and the experimental MARS-D robot, designed as a nuclear plant inspector. It stands 130 cm (4 ft 3 in), is 70 cm (2 ft 4 in) wide, 125 cm (4 ft 1 in) long, and weights in at 440 kg (970 lb). Its robotic arms have seven degrees of freedom(=seven axes) just like a human arm and can lift 15 kg (33 lb) each. Unlike the MARS-D robot MEISTeR is robust enough to withstand the radiation environment. The remote-controlled robot can attached with a variety of tools to its hands such as cutters and drills, clear obstacles, and pierce through concrete to check radiation levels. A special tool has been developed that can take samples from walls and concrete floors in contaminated areas with a depth up to 70 millimetres (2.8 in). It can move at up to 2 km/h (1.2 mph) and negotiates uneven terrain, including stairsteps up to 22 cm (8.7 in) on its four independently moving tank tracks. It has an expected working time of two hours.
