= Mitsubishi Minatomirai Industrial Museum =

Technology museum in Yokohama, Japan

Coordinates: 35.4558°N 139.6300°E

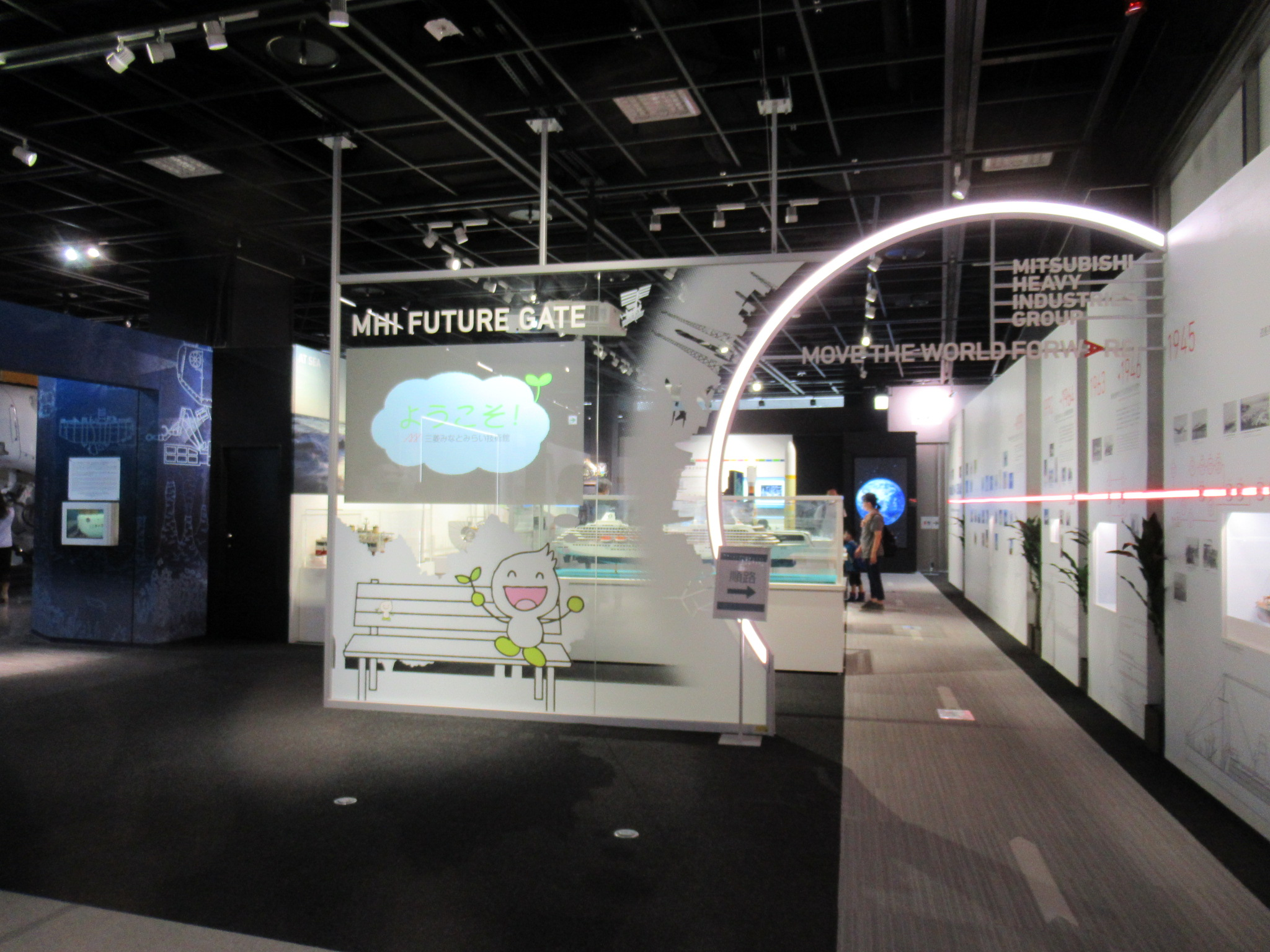
Exhibits inside the Mitsubishi Minatomirai Industrial Museum in Yokohama, Japan.

The Mitsubishi Minatomirai Industrial Museum (in Japanese, 三菱みなとみらい技術館) in a museum located in Yokohama, Kanagawa.

== Description ==
The museum was established in 1994 by Mitsubishi Heavy Industries with the aim to make technology more accessible for young people.

The museum features exhibits organized on the themes of land, space, seat, and the future (UN's Sustainable Development Goals). For example, the section on space features an actual LE-7A rocket engine, used in the H-IIA and H-IIB rockets.
