= Common Tactical Wheeled Vehicle =

Japanese wheeled armoured fighting vehicle

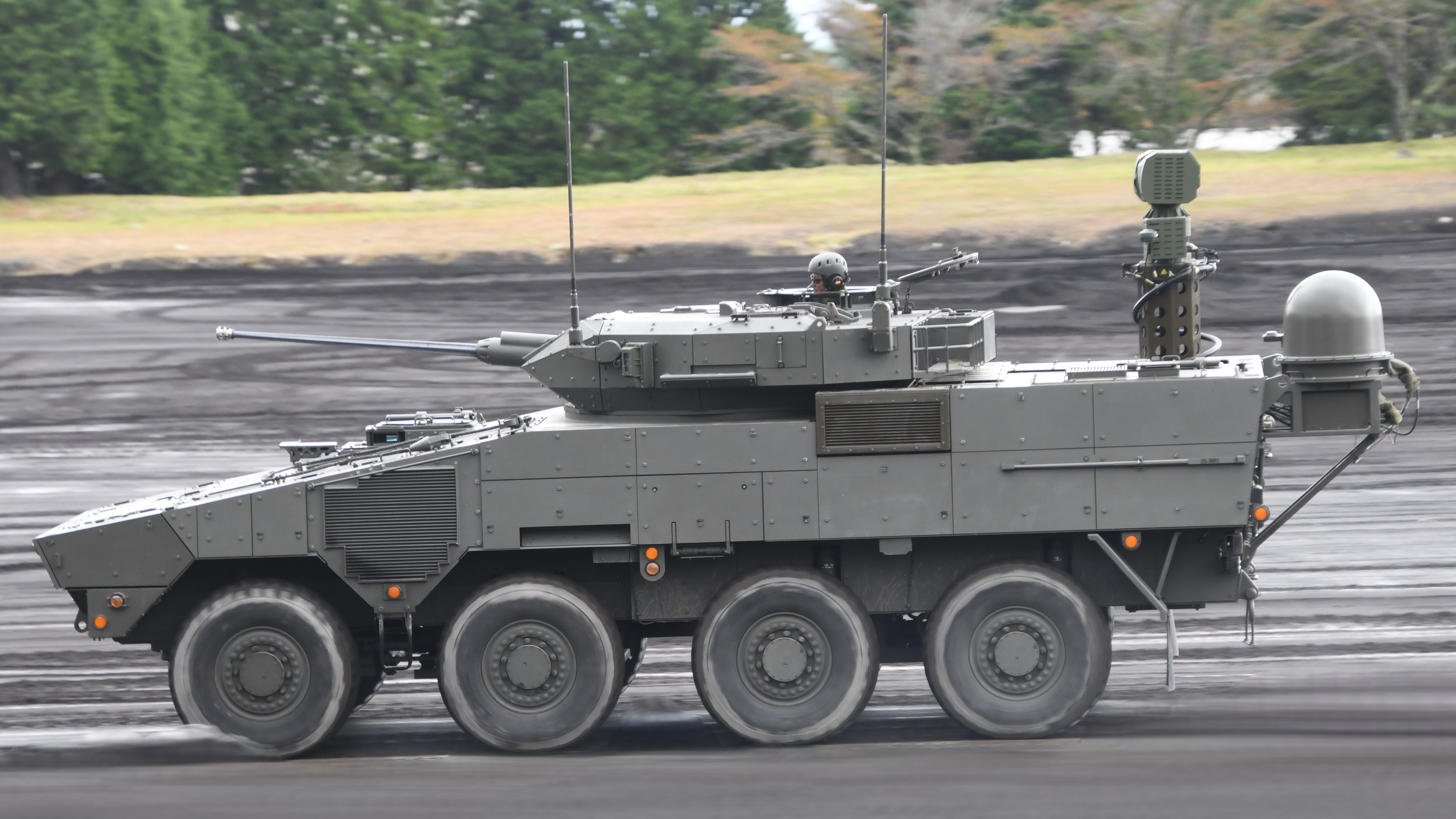
- The Type 25 RCV, one of the variants of the CTWV.
- Type: Armored fighting vehicle
- Place of origin: Japan

Service history
- In service: 2024-present
- Used by: Japan

Production history
- Designer: TRDI (Technical Research & Development Institute) (Note: Became the Acquisition, Technology & Logistics Agency in 2015.)
- Designed: 2010 - 2024
- Manufacturer: Mitsubishi Heavy Industries
- Developed from: Type 16 MCV Mobile Armored Vehicle
- Unit cost: ¥ 1 billion yen (USD $7.04 million) (Note: Unit cost is based on the 2024 budget, with ¥ 24.2 billion for 24 ICV (first serial production order))
- Produced: Since 2024 (serial production)
- No. built: 3 prototypes as of 2024
- Variants: Type 24 AWCV; Type 24 MM; Type 25 RCV

Specifications
- Mass: Empty weight: 18,000 kg (40,000 lb); Combat weight: 28,000 kg (62,000 lb)
- Length: 8.1 to 8.7 m (27 to 29 ft)
- Width: 3 m (9.8 ft)
- Height: 2.7 to 2.9 m (8 ft 10 in to 9 ft 6 in)
- Crew: 3 (Type 24 AWCV); 5 (Type 24 MM and Type 25 RCV)
- Passengers: 8 (Type 24 AWCV)
- Main armament: Mk44 Bushmaster II (unmanned turret of the Type 24 AWCV and manned turret of the Type 25 RCV); 2R2M mortar (in the Type 24 MM)
- Secondary armament: 7.62 mm Mk 52 chain gun (Type 24 AWCV and Type 25 RCV)
- Engine: Mitsubishi Heavy Industries 4VA Diesel; 400 kW (540 hp)
- Power/weight: 29.8 hp/tonne empty
- Payload capacity: 10,000 kg (22,000 lb)
- Suspension: Independent Double wishbone suspension or Hydropneumatic suspension
- Maximum speed: Over 100 km/h (62 mph)

The Common Tactical Wheeled Vehicle (CTWV) is a family of wheeled armored vehicles that are expected to be deployed by the Japan Ground Self-Defense Force (JGSDF). This vehicle is based on the same platform as the Type 16 MCV, and four further variants have been developed, of which three will enter service.

== Background ==
The CTWV is based on the Mitsubishi Heavy Industries MAV (Mobile Armored Vehicle), development of which was initiated in the early 2010s, and was unveiled in 2014 at Eurosatory. It is derived from the Type 16 MCV with which it shared 80% of the components.

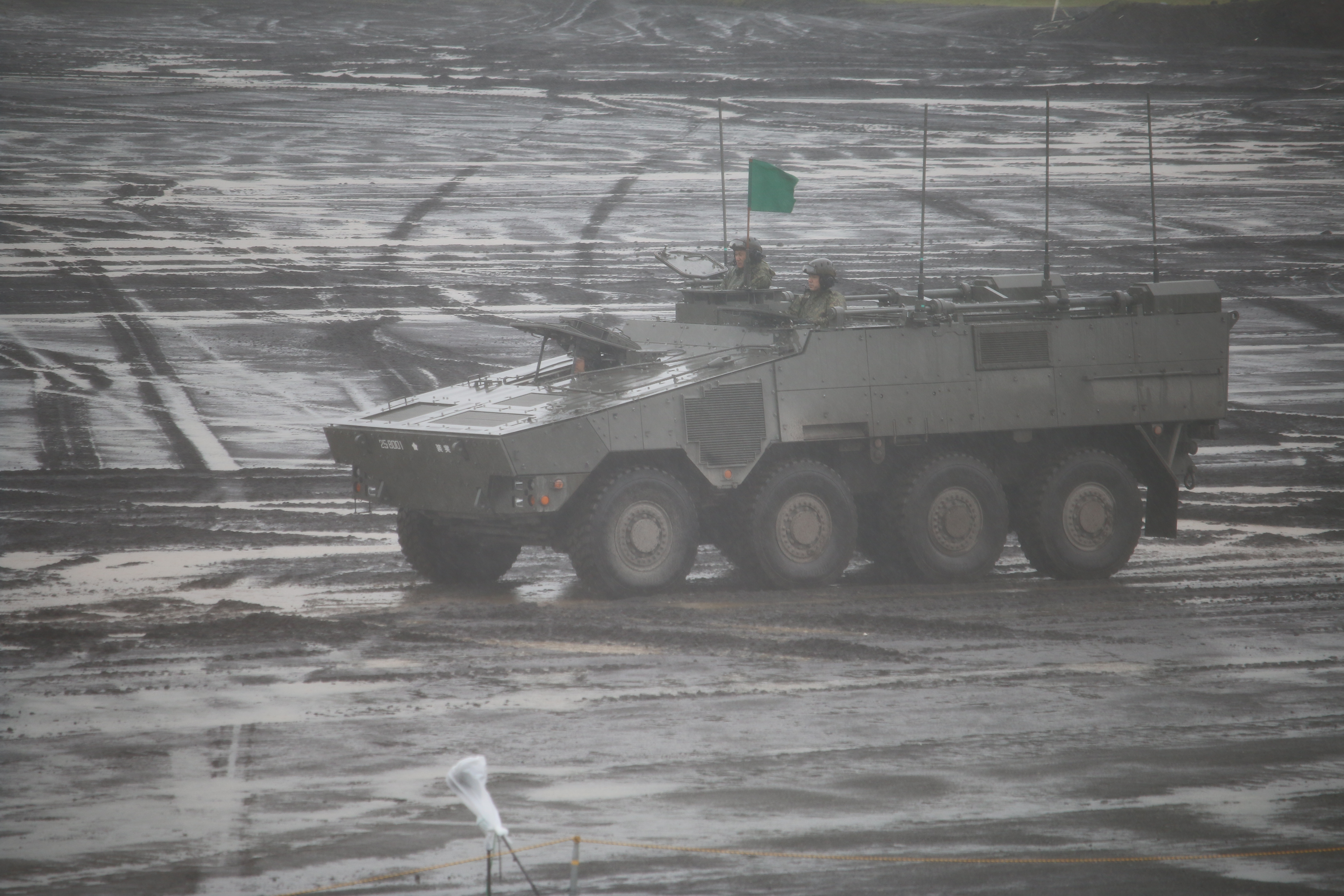
Type 24 MM

In December 2019, the JGSDF ordered prototypes of three new variants of the MAV under the CTWV program: the Type 24 AWCV (Armored Wheeled Combat Vehicle), the Type 24 MM (Mobile 120 mm Mortar), and the Type 25 RCV (Reconnaissance Combat Vehicle). The vehicle family is intended to be deployed alongside the Type 16 MCV, providing fire support and intelligence gathering capabilities.

This family of vehicles has been ordered to equip the Rapid Deployment Regiment of the Japan Ground Self-Defense Force, able to quickly be deployed in case of an urgent need. A total of 370 armored fighting vehicles of this family are expected to be ordered.

== Variants ==
=== Type 24 AWCV (Armored Wheeled Combat Vehicle) ===
This variant is a wheeled highly mobile infantry fighting vehicle for the JGSDF.

=== Type 24 MM (Mobile 120 mm Mortar) ===
This variant will be replacement of the 120 mm mortar RT (license-built version of the MO-120 RT). The vehicle has a roof opening system for a Thales 2R2M mortar platform capable of firing in 360°. On the sides, there are storage spaces for the shells and propellant.

=== Type 25 RCV (Reconnaissance Combat Vehicle) ===
This variant is designed to succeed to the Type 87 RCV in the JGSDF. The testing of the prototype was going on in 2023.

== Operators ==
=== Future operators ===
Japan (93 ordered as of 2026, 370 planned)
As of 2026, the total order list includes:
- Type 24 AWCV: 42 serial production + 1 prototype
- Type 24 MM: 24 serial production + 1 prototype
- Type 25 RCV : 24 serial production + 1 prototype

== Detailed list of orders ==
Fiscal year	Cost (¥ billion)	Variants of the CTWV Common Tactical Wheeled Vehicle			Notes
Fiscal year	Cost (¥ billion)	Type 24 Wheeled Armored Fighting Vehicle	Type 24 Mobile 120 mm Mortar	Type 25 Reconnaissance and Surveillance Vehicle	Notes
Target total	–	150	100	120	370 AFV planned
2027	–	–	–	–	
2027	–	–	–	–	
2027	–	–	–	–	
2026	¥ 9.50	–	8	–	
2026	¥ 27.60	–	–	18	
2025	¥ 22.00	18	–	–	
2025	¥ 8.50	–	8	–	
2025	¥ 9.10	–	–	6	
2024	¥ 24.20	24	–	–	
2024	¥ 8.00	–	8	–	
2023	¥ 0.00	–	–	–	–
2022	¥ 0.00	–	–	–	–
2021	¥ 0.00	–	–	–	–
2020	¥ 0.00	–	–	–	–
2019	¥ 2.35	1	1	1	Prototypes
Total	¥ 111.25 (+ ¥ 0)	43 (+ 0)	25 (+ 0)	25 (+ 0)	–
Total	¥ 111.25 (+ ¥ 0)	93 (+ 0)			–

Targeted number of vehicles
Budget request
