= Jeffrey Sonnenfeld =

American academic (born 1954)

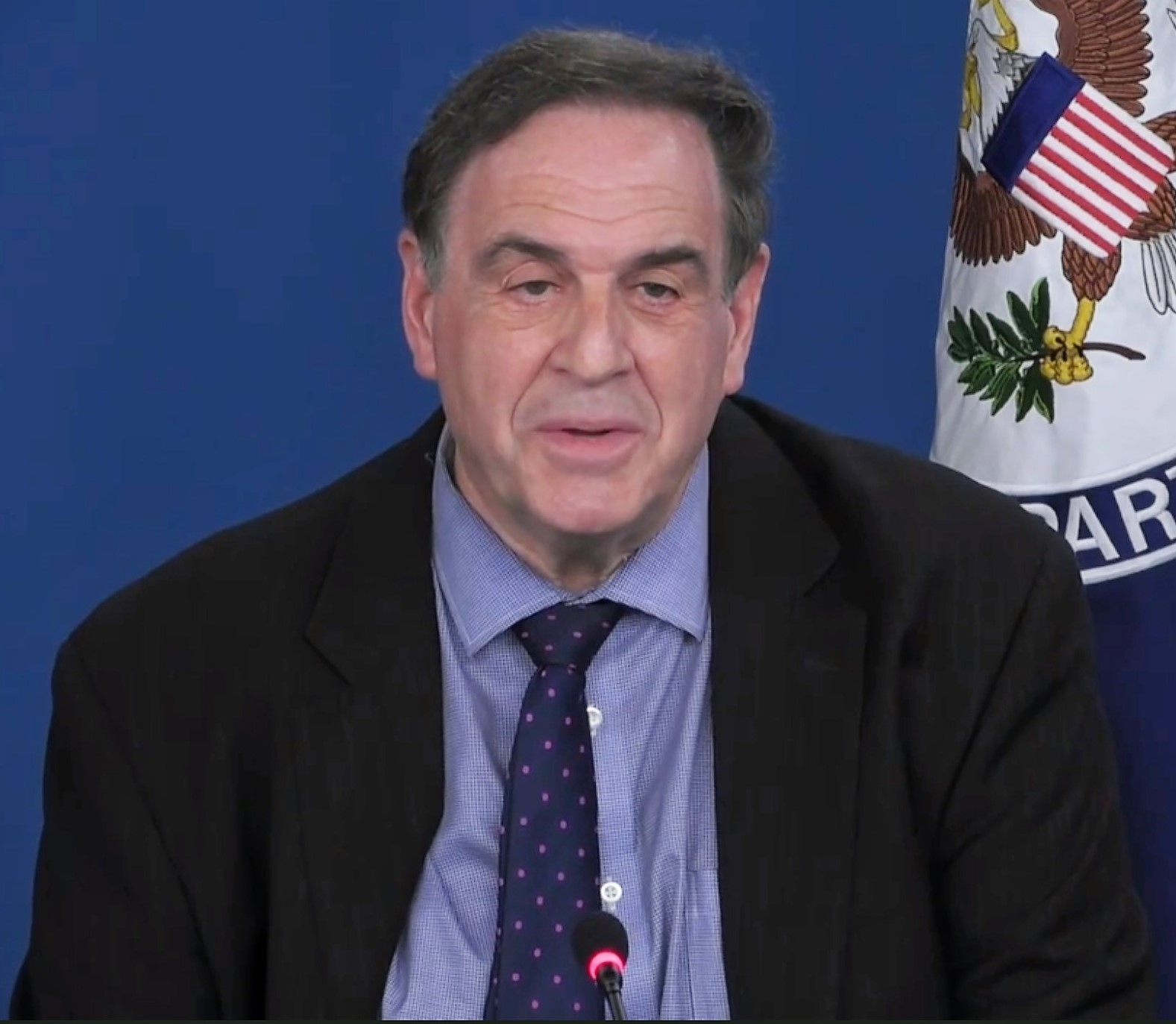
- Sonnenfeld speaks at the US State Department in 2022.
- Born: April 1, 1954 (age 72); Philadelphia, Pennsylvania, U.S.

Academic background
- Education: Harvard University (BA, MBA, PhD)

Academic work
- Institutions: Yale School of Management Senior Associate Dean for Leadership Studies, Lester Crown Professor in the Practice of Management, founder of Chief Executive Leadership Institute (CELI)

Jeffrey A. Sonnenfeld (born 1 April 1954) is an American academic with a speciality in studying business leadership and management. He is the Lester Crown Professor in the Practice of Management at Yale School of Management, and Senior Associate Dean for Leadership Studies. Sonnenfeld is best known as the founder and CEO of Chief Executive Leadership Institute (CELI), affiliated with Yale University.

Sonnenfeld is known for convening Yale's semi-annual CEO Summits, which have drawn thousands of CEOs from across decades for off-the-record peer-to-peer conversations. In his personal capacity, he has informally advised thousands of CEOs as well as multiple U.S. presidents and nominees from both parties, including Joe Biden, Donald Trump, Bill Clinton, and George H. W. Bush as a conduit between top business and political leaders. He is the first academician to have rung the opening bells of both the New York Stock Exchange and the Nasdaq Stock Exchange, having done so 10 times. Sonnenfeld is a member of the board of Lennar, the leading American homebuilder, as well as IEX, Atlas Merchant Capital, and the Ellis Island Honor Society. Sonnenfeld was appointed by Connecticut Governor Ned Lamont to serve as co-chair of Advance CT, where he currently leads the state’s economic development, including attracting and retaining leading global businesses and developing the state’s workforce.

== Biography ==
=== Early life ===
Born in Philadelphia on April 1, 1954, to Jewish parents, Jeffrey Sonnenfeld is the son of Burton Sonnenfeld, a men's clothing retailer, and Rochelle Sonnenfeld, a healthcare and community leader. Sonnenfeld's mother, Rochelle, originally immigrated to the United States from the former Russian Empire in the 1920s. Sonnenfeld earned his BA, MBA, and PhD degrees from Harvard University. At age 26, he joined the faculty of the Harvard Business School where he taught for 10 years.

=== Career ===
After a decade at Emory University, Sonnenfeld joined the faculty at Yale, bringing with him the CEO College and launching the Chief Executive Leadership Institute. At Yale, he built a new department of Executive Programs, offering 35 programs a year to roughly 2,000 top leaders with sessions in New Haven, New York City, Beijing, New Delhi, Mumbai, and Shanghai, and opened Yale University's first outpost in Washington, D.C., in 2011. His 2007 book, Firing Back (with Andrew Ward, Harvard Business School Press), studies the paths to resilience for felled CEOs, as well as victims from natural disasters, warfare, and other forms of disruption and adversity.

At Yale SOM, Sonnenfeld teaches the popular course "Strategic Leadership Across Sectors". Sonnenfeld's previous students from Harvard, Emory, and Yale have gone on to become successful in their respective fields.

=== Emory University incident ===
In 1997, while employed as a professor at Emory University, Sonnenfeld was accused by the university of vandalizing school property. Sonnenfeld refuted the charges, resigned, and sued Emory University, and the parties reached a settlement.

== Yale Chief Executive Leadership Institute ==
Sonnenfeld is the founder of Chief Executive Leadership Institute (CELI), a non-profit educational and research institute focused on CEO leadership and corporate governance, and the world's first school for chief executives. He pioneered the program as a prototype at the Harvard Business School in 1987 and 1988. In 2000, this institute moved to Yale University where it presently resides.

Sonnenfeld's CEO summits have drawn leaders from business, government, public policy, nonprofits, NGOs, and higher education. Past attendees have included Joe Biden, Bob Iger, Stephen Schwarzman, Jamie Dimon, Satya Nadella, David Solomon, Janet Yellen, Gina Raimondo, Jake Sullivan, Steven Spielberg, Mike Sievert, Lisa Su, Pat Gelsinger, Ajay Banga, Ken Frazier, Arvind Krishna, Joe Ucuzoglu, Larry Page, Greg Brown, Max Levchin, Michael Dell, Steve Case, Lloyd Blankfein, Ray Dalio, Ashton Carter, Elaine Chao, Maurice Greenberg, Dina Powell, Robert Hormats, Carla Hills, Farooq Kathwari, John Bogle, John Whitehead, Albert Gordon, Jeffrey Bewkes, Randall Stephenson, David Shulkin, Wilbur Ross, Steven Mnuchin, Anthony Scaramucci, Peter Orszag, John Negroponte, Chris Shays, Indra Nooyi, Kevin Rudd, Ken Langone, Peter Navarro, Bob Woodward, Roland Betts, Peter Salovey, Danny Meyer, Brian Duperreault, Joanne Lipman, Jeff Zucker, Stefano Pessina, Dennis Muilenburg, Alex Gorsky, David Abney, Robert Lighthizer, Jared Kushner, Pete Buttigieg, Richard Blumenthal, Isaac Herzog, Volodymyr Zelenskyy, David Rubenstein, Larry Bacow and many other influential leaders from across sectors. In December 2019, The Chief Executive Leadership Institute celebrated its 100th CEO Summit in New York City.

On behalf of Yale University, Sonnenfeld is responsible for presenting the prestigious Yale Legend of Leadership Award and the Yale Lifetime of Leadership Award. Past recipients have included Colin Powell, Carla Hills, Stephen Schwarzman, Maurice Greenberg, John Whitehead, John Bogle, Albert Gordon, David Stern, Bernard Marcus, Bob Iger, Indra Nooyi, Janet Yellen, Ginni Rometty, Mary Barra, Brian Moynihan, David Rubenstein, Marillyn Hewson, Jamie Dimon, and Ken Frazier.

His scholarly research focus is in management and social responsibility, and he has published in journals such as Administrative Science Quarterly, Academy of Management Journal, The Academy of Management Review, Journal of Organizational Behavior, Social Forces, Human Relations, and Human Resource Management, as well as authored many books, including The Hero's Farewell: What Happens When CEOs Retire (Oxford University Press, 1988) and Firing Back: How Great Leaders Overcome Adversity (Harvard Business School Press, 2007) with Emory alumnus Andrew Ward. Sonnenfeld has served on the editorial boards of several journals, and his professional activities also include membership on various non-profit organization and public company boards.

Sonnenfeld earned the 2018 Ellis Island Medal of Honor from the Ellis Island Honors Society. He was Harvard's first John Whitehead Faculty Fellow and won outstanding educator awards at Yale, Emory and the American Society for Training and Development. Additionally, he was the winner of ATT's "Hawthorn Award for Social Research in Industry" and Richard D. Irwin Award for Management Research. He was also awarded the Distinguished Eagle Scout Award by the Boy Scouts of America. Sonnenfeld was listed by Business Week as one of the "ten B-school professors who are influencing contemporary business thinking" and one of the "100 most influential players in corporate governance" by National Association of Corporate Director's Directorship.

He is on the board of IEX, Lennar, Atlas Merchant Capital, the Ellis Island Honor Society, the National Council on Aging, and a representative of Governor Ned Lamont on the AdvanceCT Board of Directors. He is a member of the Ellis Island Foundation Trustees and is a board member for Advance Connecticut with the Connecticut Economic Resource Center.

== Selected publications ==
- Colvin, G. (2000) The End Of The Affair Jeffrey Sonnenfeld's battle with Emory University is finally over, but the question remains: Why on earth did Emory's president accuse Sonnenfeld of vandalism?
- Sonnenfeld, J., Kusin, M., & Waltonz, E. (2013). What CEOs Really Think of Their Boards. Harvard Business Review, 91(4), 98–106.
- Sonnenfeld, J., "The Jamie Dimon Witch Hunt", New York Times op-ed, May 8, 2013. Argued that having separate individuals serving as board chair and CEO is "no panacea that ensures good economic results or good governance" as the JPMorgan Chase chairman, president and CEO, a CELI participant, faced a proxy vote favoring separation.
- Hayibor, S., Agle, B., Sears, G., Sonnenfeld, J., & Ward, A. (2011). Value Congruence and Charismatic Leadership in CEO-Top Manager Relationships: An Empirical Investigation. Journal of Business Ethics, 102(2), 237–254. doi:10.1007/s10551-011-0808-y.
- Sonnenfeld, J. A., & Ward, A. J. (2007). FIRING BACK: How Great Leaders Rebound After Career Disasters. Harvard Business Review, 85(1), 76–84.
- Gandossy, R., & Sonnenfeld, J., ed. (2004). Leadership and Governance from the Inside Out. Hoboken, NJ: John Wiley.
- Sonnenfeld, J. A. (2002). What Makes Great Boards Great. Harvard Business Review, 80(9), 106–113.
- Epstein, C., Olivares, F., Bass, B., Graham, P., Schwartz, F. N., Siegel, M. R., Mansbridge, J., Lloyd, K., Wyskocil, P., Cohen, A., Bradford, D., Sonnenfeld, J., & Goldberg, C. (1991). Ways Men and Women Lead. Harvard Business Review, 69(1), 150–160.
- Sonnenfeld, J. A. (1988). The Hero's Farewell: what happens when CEOs retire. New York: Oxford University Press.
- Sonnenfeld, J. A. (1984). Managing Career Systems: Channeling the Flow of Executive Careers, Homewood, IL: Richard D. Irwin.
- Sonnenfeld, J. A., (1981). Corporate Views of the Public Interest, Boston: Auburn House.
- Sonnenfeld, J., & Lawrence, P. R. (1978). Why do companies succumb to price fixing? Harvard Business Review, 56(4), 145–157.
- Sonnenfeld, J. (1978). Dealing with the aging work force. Harvard Business Review, 56(6), 81–92.

== See also ==
- Yale CELI List of Companies
