= Type 25 RCV =

Japanese armoured reconnaissance vehicle

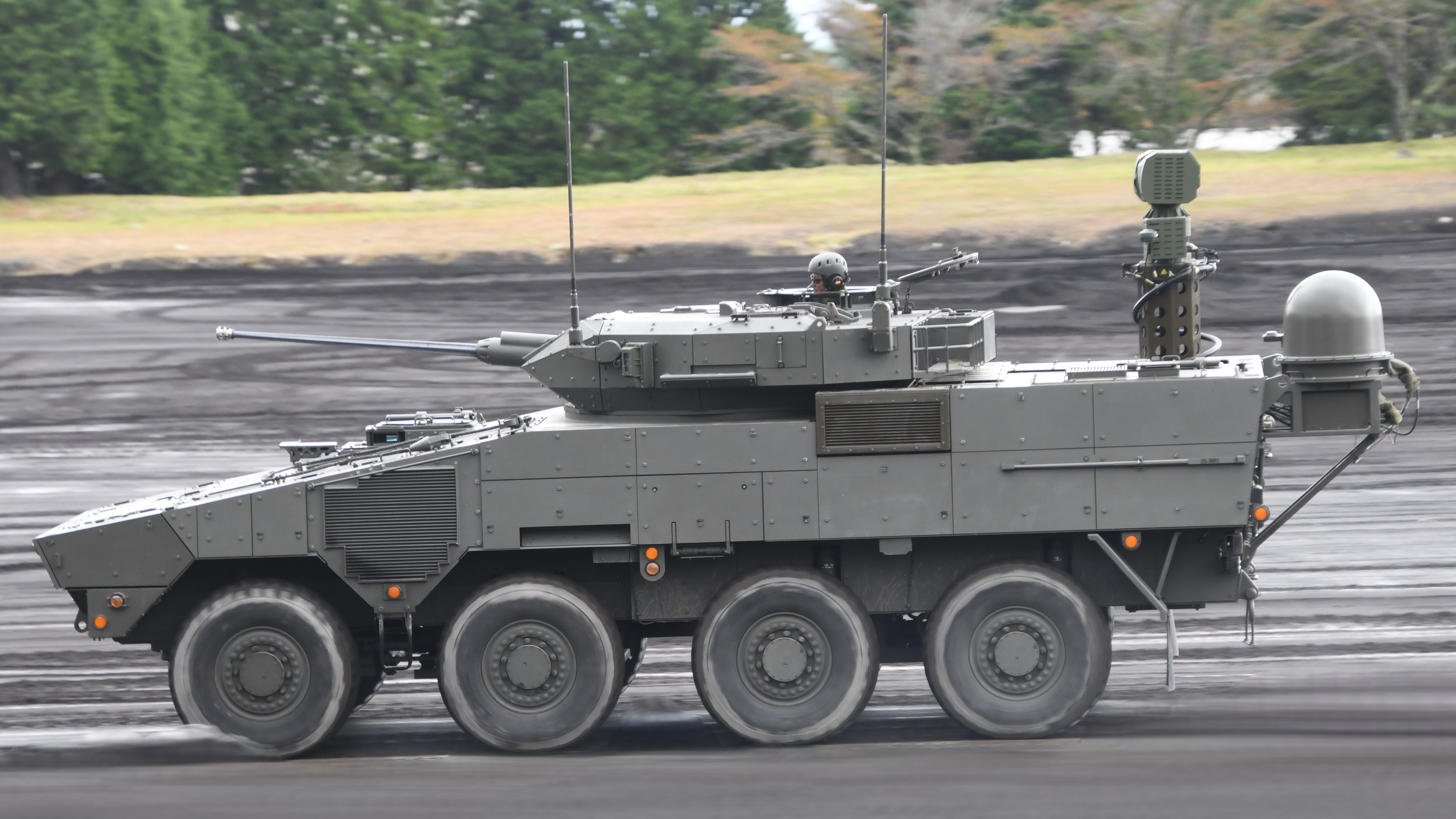
- The Type 25 RCV with its distinctive antenna dome and electro-optics mast visible.
- Type: Armored fighting vehicle
- Place of origin: Japan

Service history
- Used by: Japan Ground Self-Defense Force

Production history
- Manufacturer: Mitsubishi Heavy Industries
- Developed from: Common Tactical Wheeled Vehicle

Specifications
- Mass: 26.0 t (57,300 lb)
- Length: 8.70 m (28.5 ft)
- Width: 3.00 m (9.84 ft)
- Height: 2.90 m (9.5 ft)
- Crew: 5
- Main armament: Mk44 Bushmaster II autocannon (30×173mm)
- Secondary armament: Mk52 Bushmaster coaxial machine gun (7.62×51mm NATO)
- Engine: MHI 4VA ((11.3 litres, 4-cylinder turbo-diesel); 570 hp (430 kW)
- Power/weight: 21.9 hp/t (16.3 kW/t)
- Maximum speed: > 100 km/h (62 mph)

The Type 25 RCV (25式偵察警戒車, nigoshiki teisatsu keikaisha; Type 25 Reconnaissance Combat Vehicle) is the Japan Ground Self-Defense Force's next generation reconnaissance vehicle. It shares the same chassis with the Type 16 MCV along with the Type 24 AWCV and the Type 24 MM, all belonging to the Common Tactical Wheeled Vehicle family. It is manufactured and maintained by Mitsubishi Heavy Industries.

== History ==
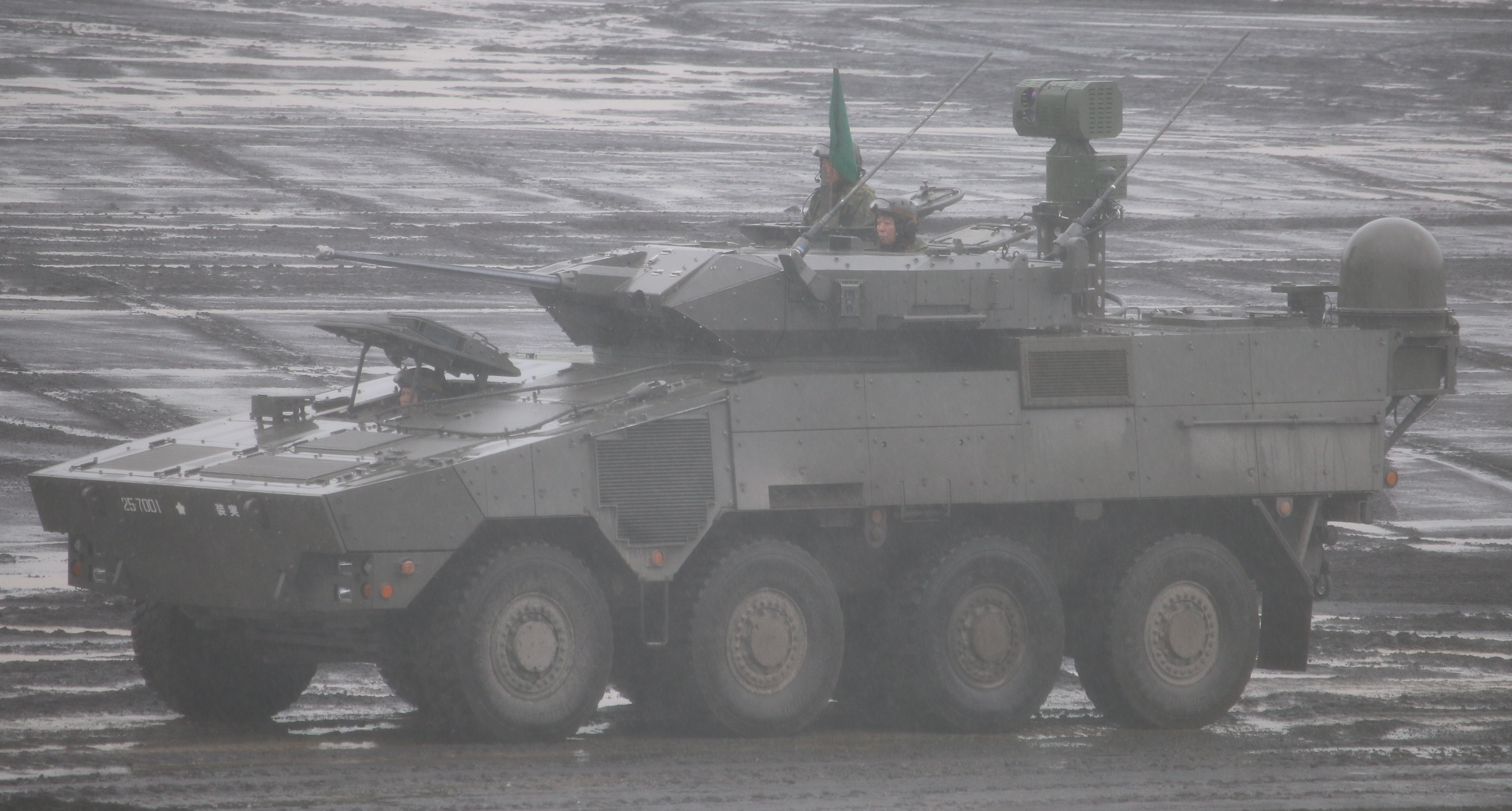
Type 25 RCV

It was announced in 2025 during the Fuji Firepower Review that the vehicle is formally named the Type 25 RCV and is introduced into deployment.

== Design ==
Unlike the Type 24 MM and the Type 24 AWCV, the Type 25 RCV procurement program only started a year later in 2025, where a total of 9.1 billion yen was budgeted for the initial six vehicles. Ultimately, a total of 116 to 120 vehicles are planned to be procured. The Type 25 is easily identified by a semi-spherical dome covering the antenna and a mast-like structure on the rear of the vehicle that houses its electro-optics.

== Operators ==
=== Future operators ===
Japan
As of 2026, the total order list includes: 24 serial production + 1 prototype.

== Production ==
Fiscal year	Cost (¥ billion)	Quantity	Notes
Target total	–	120	370 AFV planned
2027	–	–	
2026	¥ 27.60	18	
2025	¥ 9.10	6	
Total	¥ 36.70 (+ ¥ 0)	24 (+ 0)	–

Targeted number of vehicles
Budget request
