= Yale CELI List of Companies =

List of companies graded by Yale for their response to the Russian invasion of Ukraine

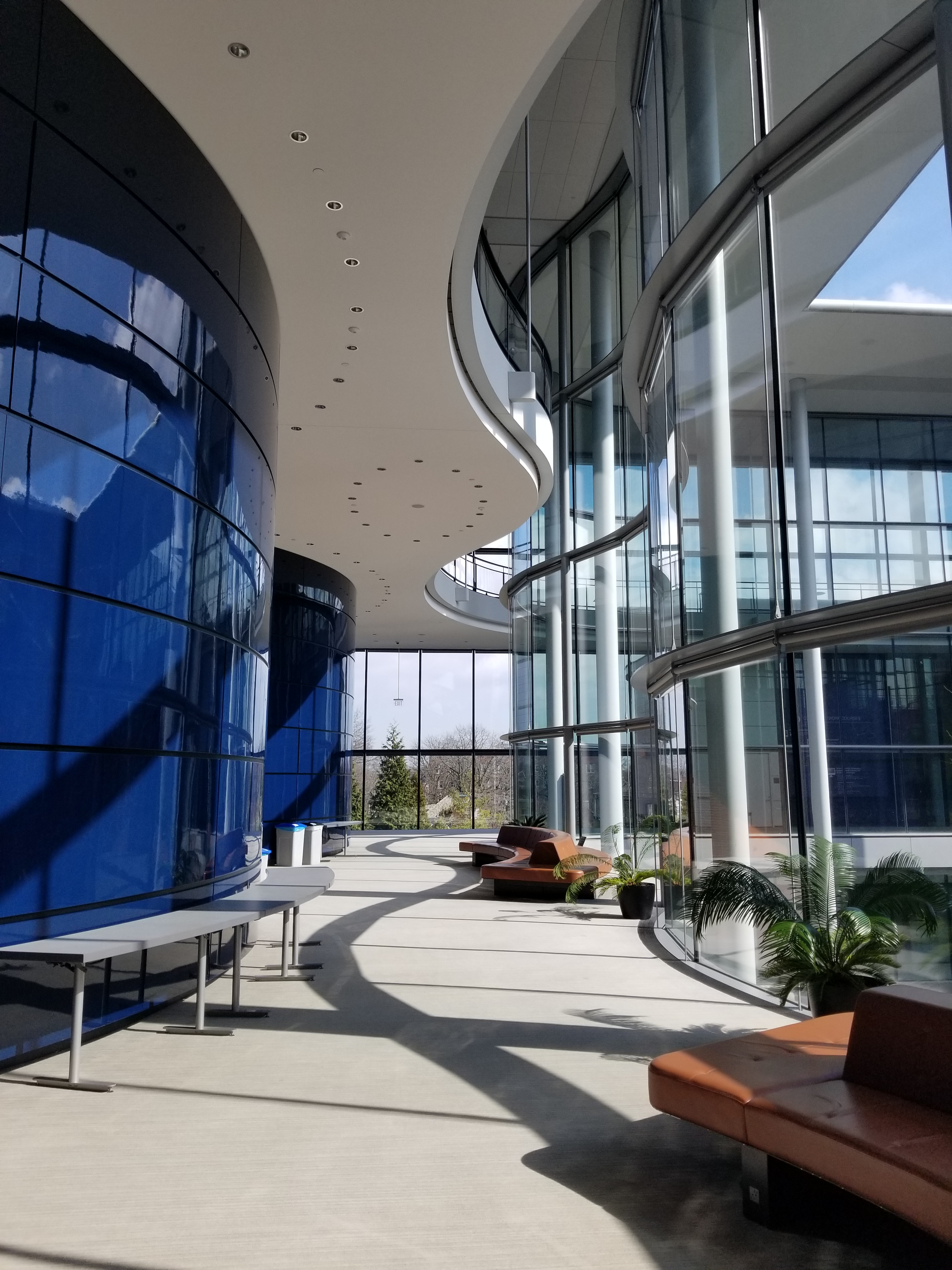
Evans Hall, Yale School of Management, 2020

The Yale CELI List of Companies is a database compiled and maintained by Yale University's Chief Executive Leadership Institute (CELI), tracking the engagement of global corporations in Russia following the 2022 Russian invasion of Ukraine. It grades over 1,000 companies based on their level of disengagement or continued involvement with the Russian market, serving as a public accountability tool to influence corporate decisions and transparency. Leaders include CELI Research Director and the Senior Associate Dean at the Yale School of Management, Professor and CELI President Jeffrey Sonnenfeld.

== History ==
CELI launched the list in March 2022 in direct response to Russia's invasion of Ukraine. Initially covering fewer than 100 corporations, it quickly expanded as media attention grew. By mid-2022, approximately 1,000 companies had been evaluated. The list is frequently updated to reflect changing corporate behaviors and decisions.

== Methodology ==
Companies are graded from A to F according to their operational status in Russia:

- A – Complete withdrawal from Russia
- B – Temporary suspension of operations
- C – Significant reduction in activities
- D – Minor operational modifications, continuing business
- F – No change, continuing business as usual

The evaluations are based on publicly available corporate statements, press releases, regulatory filings, and reputable news reports. CELI regularly updates these grades to ensure accuracy and timeliness.

== Impact ==
The list is frequently cited by policymakers, media outlets, and advocacy groups. Reports suggest companies adjust their strategies to improve or maintain their grades, thus aligning corporate behavior with international expectations and investor sentiment. The list has been referenced in academic studies, news articles, and government assessments of economic responses to the Russian invasion.

== Criticism and limitations ==
CELI's list has been criticized for potential oversimplification of corporate decisions and insufficient transparency regarding grading criteria. Some companies have argued that their situations were inaccurately represented or overly simplified. Rapid updates and a dynamic market situation may affect the consistency and accuracy of evaluations.

== Management ==
The CELI list is managed by the Yale Chief Executive Leadership Institute, led by Jeffrey Sonnenfeld, Senior Associate Dean at the Yale School of Management.
